= Barcid conquest of Hispania =

3rd century BC conquest of Hispania by the Barca family

- Levels of Carthaginian control over Iberia in 218 BC
Date	237–218 BC (19 years)
Location	Carthaginian Iberia
Result	Carthaginian victory
Territorial changes	Expansion of Carthaginian Iberia

Belligerents
Carthage	Iberians; Celtiberians

Commanders and leaders
Hamilcar Barca †; Hasdrubal the Fair; Hannibal	Istolatios †; Indortes †; Orissus

Under the leadership of the Barcid family, Ancient Carthage expanded its possessions on the Iberian Peninsula from 237 to 218 BC. The First Punic War and the Mercenary War had resulted in an end to Carthage's expansion to the north (Sicily) and in Africa; blocked from their traditional areas of expanse, they now sought to conquer the Iberian Peninsula.

== Background ==
During the First Punic War, the members of Barcid family played a prominent role in the fighting against the Romans, particularly Hamilcar Barca. After the war, Hamilcar commanded the Punic forces that defeated the former Carthaginian mercenaries, who had rebelled against Carthage in the Mercenary War.

After the suppression of the rebellion, Hamilcar Barca understood that Carthage needed to strengthen its economic and military base to confront Rome, which had invaded and annexed Carthaginian Sardinia and Corsica. Rome had also ordered Carthage to pay an indemnity 1,200 talents of silver to cripple Carthage's war-making capacity. The Romans had thereby broken the Treaty of Lutatius which had ended the First Punic War.

After the First Punic War, Carthaginian possessions in Spain were limited to a handful of wealthy coastal cities: Gades, Malaca, Abdera and Sexi. In 237 BC, Spain south of the Tagus River was a land of well-developed agriculture, silver mines and fortified settlements.

Hamilcar sought the creation of a new Carthaginian Empire in Spain that would make up for the loss of the Carthage's central Mediterranean island possessions and be even stronger. Before leaving, Hamilcar appointed his son-in-law Hasdrubal the Fair as naval commander and asked his son Hannibal whether he would accompany Hamilcar to Spain. When Hannibal readily accepted, Hamilcar made him swear an oath on the sacrificial altar of Baal Hammon to never befriend Rome. Hannibal would accompany his father and brother-in-law in Spain for the next 16 years.

According to Polybius, Carthage, extremely weak after the war with the Roman Republic, was unable to provide him with the necessary fleet to a long journey across the sea, and so Hamilcar walked with his army to the Strait of Gibraltar. More likely is the tale of Diodorus Siculus, that Hamilcar embarked his army of perhaps 20,000 men and sailed along the African coast through the Strait of Gibraltar and landed at Gades in 237 BC. Carthage had the transport ships on hand and trading stations along the coast to provide resupply.

== See also ==
- Siege of Saguntum

== Bibliography ==
- Hoyos, Dexter (2003). Hannibal's Dynasty: Power and politics in the western Mediterranean, 247–183 BC. London: Routledge. ISBN 0-203-41782-8.
- Hoyos, Dexter (2015). Mastering the West: Rome and Carthage at War. Oxford: Oxford University Press. ISBN 978-0-19-986010-4.
