= Orissus =

Orissus or Orisson (floruit 3rd century BC) was a chief, leader or ruler of the Iberian Oretani.

== Biography ==
Orissus first appears in the historical record when he aided the city of Heliké (whose location is unknown) during the Carthaginian siege led by Hamilcar Barca in 228 BC. It remains uncertain whether Orissus had witnessed the previous disasters faced by Hispanic leaders like the brothers Istolatios and Indortes. Orissus assembled a formidable army from the neighboring towns and attacked the besiegers, routing them. According to some versions, he had originally approached under the pretense of assisting Hamilcar in subduing the besieged city, only to attack when the Carthaginians let their guard down. In any case, this marked Carthage's initial defeat in Hispania.

According to accounts, Orissus concealed a herd of fighting bulls with torches affixed to their horns behind his army. At the moment of the battle, the Oretani warriors ignited the torches and set the bulls upon them, resulting in chaos among their ranks and the burning of their camp. Historians differ in their interpretations of this event. While Diodorus Siculus supports the account as related, Polybius and Appian provide less detail and emphasize Orissus's victory through deception. Frontinus and Zonaras suggest the use of loaded chariots carrying burning branches instead of torches on the bulls' horns.

Hamilcar's death, which is commonly associated with this battle, also faces significant discrepancies. Diodorus and Appian believe that the Carthaginian general drowned in a river after falling from his horse while being pursued by Oretani forces. Frontinus claims that Hamilcar survived the river crossing, only to be slain moments later by warriors from Helike. Zonaras suggests that he fell into his own camp while attempting to escape the chaos. Polybius posits that Hamilcar met his end at the hands of an Iberian tribe but does not specify whether this occurred during this particular battle or if Hamilcar managed to escape and met his fate later. Cornelius Nepos claims he fell against the Vettones.

In the subsequent year (227 BC), Orissus suffered defeat at the hands of Hasdrubal the Fair, Hamilcar's son-in-law, who returned to the conquest with reinforcements comprising 50,000 men, 6,000 horsemen, and 200 elephants. Orissus was likely executed thereafter, as those held responsible for Hamilcar's death reportedly faced punishment, and the twelve cities under his command were handed over to the Punics.

== Sources ==
- Antonio Alburquerque Pérez, Indortes e Istolacio, Orisón, Indíbil y Mandonio, 1988.
