= Battle of the Tagus (220 BC) =

Carthaginian victory in Hispania

- Part of Barcid conquest of Hispania
Date	220 BC
Location	Tagus River near the border between today's Guadalajara and Madrid regions, Iberian Peninsula
Result	Punic victory

Belligerents
Carthaginian Empire	Carpetani; Vaccaei; Olcades

Commanders and leaders
Hannibal Barca Hamilcar Barca	Unknown

The battle of the Tagus was a confrontation that took place in the framework of the Carthaginian campaigns against the peoples of the Central Plateau of the Iberian Peninsula. It took place in 220 B.C. along the river Tagus, pitting an army commanded by Hannibal Barca against a large Carpetani army, which had been joined by contingents of Vaccaei and Olcades. According to the numbers shown by the classic sources, it had to be the battle that involved a greater number of combatants in the Iberian Peninsula before the Roman presence.

This confrontation is the first pitch battle led by Hannibal Barca - who was then 27 years old - after the sieges of Althia, Helmantiké (Salamanca) and Arbucala (Toro). It is also the first historical account of the Carpetani.

The battle took place in one of the fords that allowed crossing the upper stretch of the Tagus. Traditionally, the place known as Valdeguerra, in Colmenar de Oreja, has been considered as the site where this war event took place. Due to the dates of the beginning of Hannibal's campaign (spring); the journey made from Carthage to the place of the battle (more than 1200 kilometers) and the time spent in the sieges of Helmantiké and Arbucala, it is estimated that the battle took place during the autumn.
