= 237 BC =

237 BC in various calendars
Gregorian calendar	237 BC; CCXXXVII BC
Ab urbe condita	517
Ancient Egypt era	XXXIII dynasty, 87
Pharaoh	Ptolemy III Euergetes, 10
Ancient Greek Olympiad (summer)	135th Olympiad, year 4
Assyrian calendar	4514
Balinese saka calendar	N/A
Bengali calendar	−830 – −829
Berber calendar	714
Buddhist calendar	308
Burmese calendar	−874
Byzantine calendar	5272–5273
Chinese calendar	癸亥年 (Water Pig); 2461 or 2254 — to — 甲子年 (Wood Rat); 2462 or 2255
Coptic calendar	−520 – −519
Discordian calendar	930
Ethiopian calendar	−244 – −243
Hebrew calendar	3524–3525
- Hindu calendars
Vikram Samvat	−180 – −179
Shaka Samvat	N/A
Kali Yuga	2864–2865
Holocene calendar	9764
Iranian calendar	858 BP – 857 BP
Islamic calendar	884 BH – 883 BH
Javanese calendar	N/A
Julian calendar	N/A
Korean calendar	2097
Minguo calendar	2148 before ROC 民前2148年
Nanakshahi calendar	−1704
Seleucid era	75/76 AG
Thai solar calendar	306–307
Tibetan calendar	ཆུ་མོ་ཕག་ལོ་ (female Water-Boar) −110 or −491 or −1263 — to — ཤིང་ཕོ་བྱི་བ་ལོ་ (male Wood-Rat) −109 or −490 or −1262

Year 237 BC was a year of the pre-Julian Roman calendar. At the time it was known as the Year of the Consulship of Caudinus and Flaccus (or, less frequently, year 517 Ab urbe condita). The denomination 237 BC for this year has been used since the early medieval period, when the Anno Domini calendar era became the prevalent method in Europe for naming years.

== Events ==
=== By place ===
==== Carthage ====
- Hamilcar Barca's success in defeating the rebels results in a growth in his strength as leader of Carthage's popular party and support for his proposed invasion of the Iberian Peninsula. However, as spokesman for the landed nobility, Hanno opposes the policy of foreign conquest pursued by Hamilcar Barca.
- Nevertheless, Hamilcar Barca leads a Carthaginian army in an invasion of the Iberian Peninsula with the aim of building a base from which war with Rome can be renewed. By skillful generalship and able diplomacy, Hamilcar extends Carthaginian dominion over many Spanish tribes.

==== China ====
- Lü Buwei is deposed as the Prime Minister of Qin.

== Deaths ==
- Istolatios, warlord of the Turdetani (Iberian Peninsula), crucified by Hamilcar Barca (father of Hannibal)
