= Indortes =

Iberian warlord in the 3rd century BC

Indortes was an Iberian warlord from the first half of the 3rd century BC. He succeeded Istolatios in command of the Turdetan and Iberian revolt against the Carthaginians of Hamilcar Barca.

== Biography ==
The root indu- seems to be of Iberian origin and means "the strong". He is presumed brother of Istolatios, although not with reliable evidence. The historian Diodorus Siculus gives an account of his events mainly, but also Polybius, Cornelius Nepos, Justin and Appian.

Once the Carthaginian general Hamilcar landed in ancient Gades (Cádiz) in 237 BC, he defeated and crucified Istolatios, invaded the lands of the Lusitanians and the Vettones and, when he returned to the south, he found another army commanded by Indortes. He led 50,000 militiamen from nearby regions, it seems, although the number may have been exaggerated. However, probably wary of his predecessor's defeat, Indortes did not want to confront Hannibal directly, but retreated to a high place, from which he hoped to gain the upper hand. The Carthaginians surrounded him and entered into battle, and although Indortes managed to make a large part of the army escape alive, he himself was captured by Hamilcar, who had him tortured, blinded and crucified.

The Carthaginian, cruel to the chiefs but kind to the warriors, let go of all the captured Iberians, numbering about 10,000, and persuaded their cities to ally with him, using his superior force against which they would not agree. In this way he enlisted thousands of Hispanic warriors in his ranks. Since then the Hispanic rebellion against the Carthaginians became led by Orissus, who won the first victory against Hamilcar.

== Sources ==
- Antonio Alburquerque Pérez, Indortes e Istolacio, Orisón, Indíbil y Mandonio, 1988.
