= Istolatios =

3rd century BCE military leader of the Turditani

Istolatios or Istolatius was a warlord and military chief of the Turdetani in the 3rd century BC. Endowed with great prestige, he organized a large army with Turdetans and Celtiberian and Iberian troops to oppose the Carthaginian invasion of Hamilcar Barca.

== Biography ==
Diodorus Siculus describes Istolatios as a Celtic strategist in the service of the Turdetani. According to this account, he was accompanied by a brother who acted as his lieutenant. This brother has been popularly identified as Indortes, successor to Istolatius, but Diodorus's text does not seem to treat the brother and Indortes as the same person.

When Hamilcar and his mercenary contingent invaded the Guadalquivir valley in 237 BC, Istolatios went to meet him with an army of Turdetani and Iberian peoples from the region. However, being unprepared for the variety and strategy of the Carthaginian forces, which included war elephants, they were defeated. Istolatios himself was tortured and crucified.

Fighting (Hamilcar) against the Iberians and the Tartessians, with Istolatios, general of the Celts, and his brother, he killed them all, including the two brothers, with other outstanding leaders, and enlisted under his own orders three thousand, who he had captured alive.
