= Barcids =

Notable family in the ancient city of Carthage

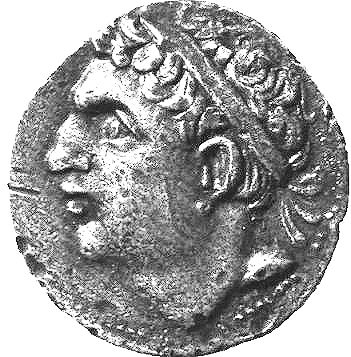
Carthaginian coin depicting Hasdrubal Barca (245-207 BC), younger brother of Hannibal Barca (247-c.182 BC)

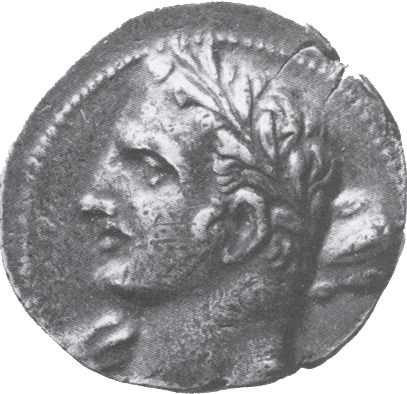
A Carthaginian coin possibly depicting Hannibal as Hercules (i.e. Heracles)

The Barcid (Punic: 𐤁𐤓𐤒, romanized: baraq) family was a notable Punic (Phoenician) family in the ancient city of Carthage; many of its members were fierce enemies of the Roman Republic. "Barcid" is an adjectival form coined by historians (cf. "Ramesside" and "Abbasid"); the actual byname was the Northwest Semitic Barca or Barcas, which means lightning (He ברק). See برق, barq in Arabic, berqa in Maltese, መብረቅ mebrek’ in Amharic, Akkadian (aka Assyrian, Babylonian, Barku) and Neo-Assyrian Syriac (Barkho).

== Background ==
During the 3rd century BC, the Barcids comprised one of the leading Phoenician families in the ruling oligarchy of Carthage. Realizing that the expansion of the Roman Republic into the Mediterranean Sea threatened the mercantile power of Carthage, they fought in the First Punic War (264–241 BC) and prepared themselves for the Second Punic War (218–201 BC).

The Barcids founded several Carthaginian cities in the Iberian Peninsula (modern Spain and Portugal), some of which still exist today. Note for example Mahón and Qart Hadast (more famous under the Latin translation of its name: "Carthago Nova" or New Carthage) which currently bears the name of Cartagena in modern-day Spain. The name is also commonly given as an etymology for the Catalan city of Barcelona.

== Family members ==
The known members of this family included the following.

The patriarch, Hamilcar Barca (275–228 BC), served as a Carthaginian general in the First Punic War (264–241 BC) and in the subsequent Mercenary War (240–238 BC). Reputedly, he made his eldest son Hannibal swear a sacred oath upon an altar of the gods "to never be a friend of Rome". After the Roman victory, he expanded the colonial possessions in Hispania (modern Spain and Portugal), where he drowned crossing a river.

Hamilcar Barca and his wife (name unknown) had six children. Their three sons each became famous military leaders in their own right. Their three daughters married Barcid family allies.

- His eldest daughter (name unknown) married Bomilcar, and became the mother of Hanno.
- His 2nd-eldest daughter (name unknown), married Hasdrubal the Fair.
  - Hasdrubal the Fair (c. 270–221 BC), Hamilcar's son-in-law, followed Hamilcar in his campaign against the governing aristocracy at Carthage at the close of the First Punic War, and in his subsequent career of conquest in Hispania. After Hamilcar's death (228 BC), Hasdrubal succeeded him in the command and extended the newly acquired empire by skillful diplomacy. He consolidated it with the foundation of Carthago Nova, establishing it as the capital of the new province in Hispania. By a treaty with Rome, he fixed the Ebro as the boundary between the two powers. He was killed by a Celtic assassin.
- His youngest daughter (name unknown) married Naravas, a Numidian chieftain. Her supposed name Salammbo is in fact the title of a book written by Gustave Flaubert.
- Hannibal (247–182 BC) oldest son of Hamilcar Barca, one of the best and most famous generals of classical antiquity, and arguably the greatest enemy of the Roman Republic. He won the famous Battle of Cannae (216 BC) but lost the crucial Battle of Zama (202 BC). Hannibal achieved popular fame for his crossing of the Alps with 60,000 soldiers and 38 elephants.
- Hasdrubal (245–207 BC), the second son of Hamilcar Barca, defended the Carthaginian cities in Hispania as Hannibal departed to Italy in 218 BC. While leading reinforcements for his brother Hannibal in 207 BC, he was defeated and killed in the decisive Battle of the Metaurus.
- Mago (also spelled Magon) (243–203 BC), the third son of Hamilcar Barca, was present at most of the battles of his famous brother and played a key role in many of them, often commanding the forces that made the "decisive push".

== See also ==
- Magonids
