= Hasdrubal the Fair =

Carthaginian military leader and politician (c. 270–221 BC)

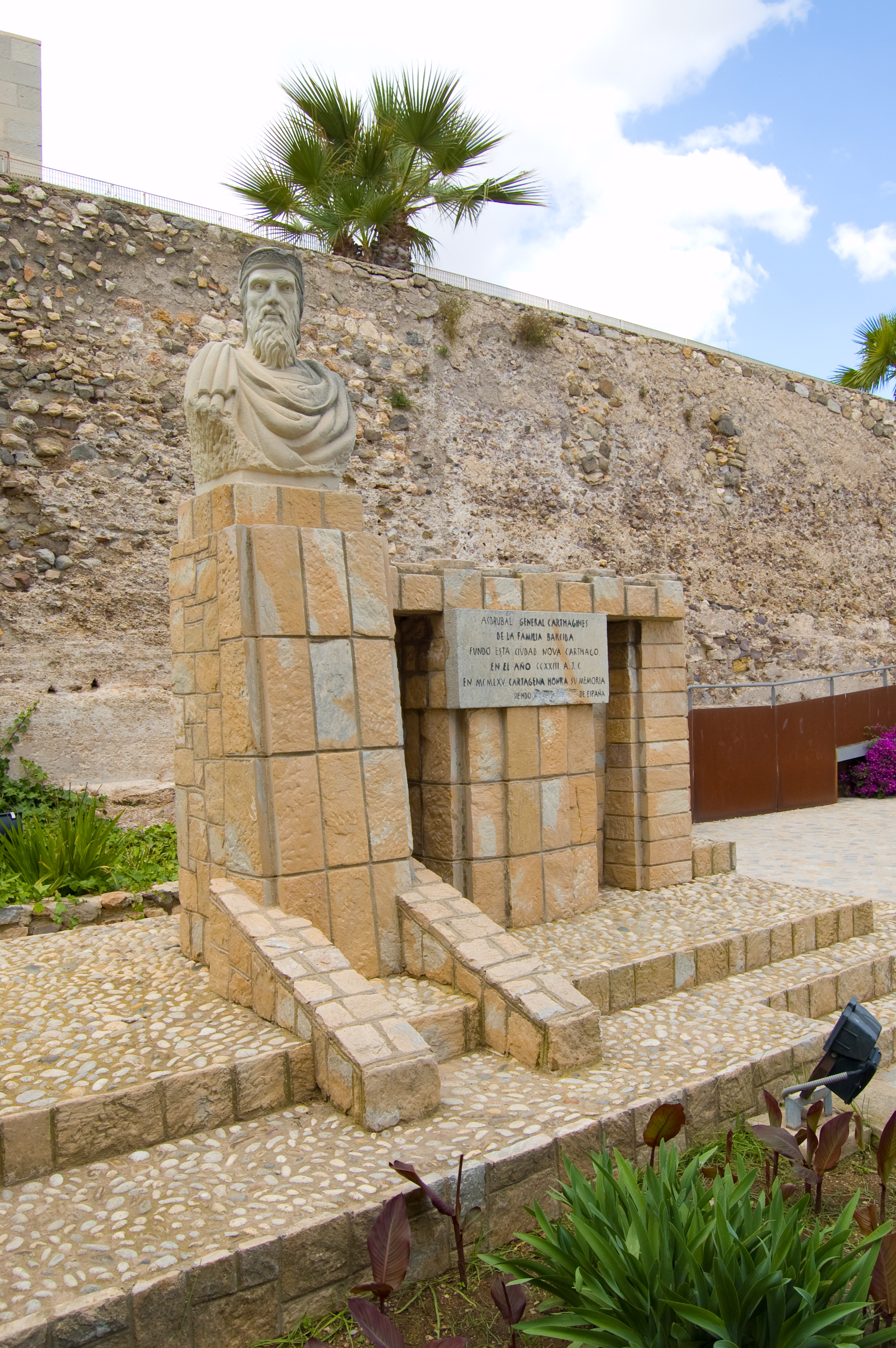
- Hasdrubal bust in Cartagena, Spain
- Born: Circa 270 BC; Carthage
- Died: 221 BC; Carthago Nova
- Cause of death: Assassination
- Occupations: Military leader and politician
- Predecessor: Hamilcar Barca
- Successor: Hannibal

Hasdrubal the Fair (Punic: 𐤏𐤆𐤓𐤁𐤏𐤋, ʿAzrobaʿl; c. 270–221 BC) was a Carthaginian military leader and politician, governor in Iberia after Hamilcar Barca's death, and founder of Cartagena.

== Family ==
Livy's History of Rome records that Hasdrubal was the brother-in-law of the Carthaginian leader Hannibal and son-in-law of Hamilcar Barca.

== Career ==
Hasdrubal followed Hamilcar in his campaign against the governing aristocracy at Carthage at the close of the First Punic War, and in his subsequent career of conquest in Hispania. In 237 BC, they parted towards the Peninsula, but around 231–230 BC Hasdrubal allegedly interceded in Hamilcar's name to make the Numidian tribes from northern Africa submit to the Barcid family, and Numidia soon fell into Carthage's sphere of influence.

After Hamilcar's death in 228 BC, while he was fighting Iberian tribes, Hasdrubal succeeded him in command and followed orders from Carthage since Hamilcar's sons were too young. Hannibal, the elder, was 19 at the time. Unlike his predecessor, Hasdrubal largely preferred diplomacy over military campaigns. In accordance with the common diplomatic customs of the time, Hasdrubal demanded hostages from the realms who capitulated to Carthage to dissuade them from breaking their treaties.

Thus, he extended the territory by skillful diplomacy and consolidating it by founding the important city and naval base of Qart Hadasht, which the Romans later called Carthago Nova as the capital of the new province, and by establishing a treaty with the Roman Republic which cemented the River Ebro (the classical Iberus) as the boundary between the two powers. This treaty was caused by a Greek colony, Emporion, and Iberian Saguntum, fearful of the continuous growth of Punic power in Iberia, asking Rome for help. Hasdrubal accepted reluctantly, as Punic dominion in Iberia was not yet sufficiently established to jeopardise its future expansion in a premature conflict.

== Death ==
Seven years after Hamilcar's death, Hasdrubal the Fair was assassinated in 221 BC by a slave of the Celtic king Tagus, who thus avenged the death of his own master.

Hasdrubal's successor was his brother-in-law and the son of Hamilcar, Hannibal Barca.

== See also ==
- Other Hasdrubals in Carthaginian history
