= Siege of Tunis (Mercenary War) =

238 BC rebel victory over Carthage

Coordinates: 36°47′51″N 10°10′0″E

- Part of the Mercenary War
Date	c. October 238 BC
Location	Tunis, modern Tunisia
Result	Rebel victory

Belligerents
Carthage	Rebels

Commanders and leaders
Hamilcar Barca; Hannibal (executed)	Mathos

Strength
c. 20,000	c. 20,000

Casualties and losses
Heavy	Unknown

During the siege of Tunis in October 238 BC a rebel army under Mathos was besieged by a Carthaginian force under Hamilcar Barca and Hannibal. A portion of the Carthaginian army, which had served in Sicily during the First Punic War, mutinied in late 241 BC in the wake of Carthage's defeat, starting the Mercenary War. After three years of increasingly bitter war, the Carthaginians defeated the rebel field army at the Battle of the Saw, after capturing its leaders. The Carthaginians then moved to besiege the rebels' strongest remaining stronghold at Tunis.

The Carthaginian commander, Hamilcar, split his forces to blockade the rebels from both north and south. At the northern camp, commanded by his subordinate Hannibal, he had the ten captured rebel leaders tortured to death and their bodies crucified before returning to his own base to the south of Tunis. Mathos organised a night attack against Hannibal's camp, which took the ill-disciplined Carthaginian defenders by surprise. It scattered the northern part of their army, and Hannibal and 30 Carthaginian notables were captured. They were tortured, mutilated and crucified still living. Hamilcar withdrew to the north with the remaining half of his army. Despite having broken the siege, Mathos abandoned Tunis and withdrew south. Hamilcar and his fellow general Hanno followed the rebels and in late 238 BC wiped them out at the Battle of Leptis Parva.

== Background ==
The First Punic War was fought between Carthage and Rome, the two main powers of the western Mediterranean in the 3rd century BC, and lasted for 23 years, from 264 to 241 BC. After immense materiel and human losses on both sides, the Carthaginians were defeated, and agreed the Treaty of Lutatius. While the war with Rome was being played out, the Carthaginian general Hanno led a series of campaigns that greatly increased the area of Africa controlled by Carthage. Hanno was rigorous in squeezing taxes out of the newly conquered territory to pay for both the war with Rome and his own campaigns. Across the Carthaginian possessions in Africa, half of all agricultural output was taken as war tax, and the tribute previously due from towns and cities was doubled. These exactions were harshly enforced, causing extreme hardship in many areas.

=== Mutiny ===
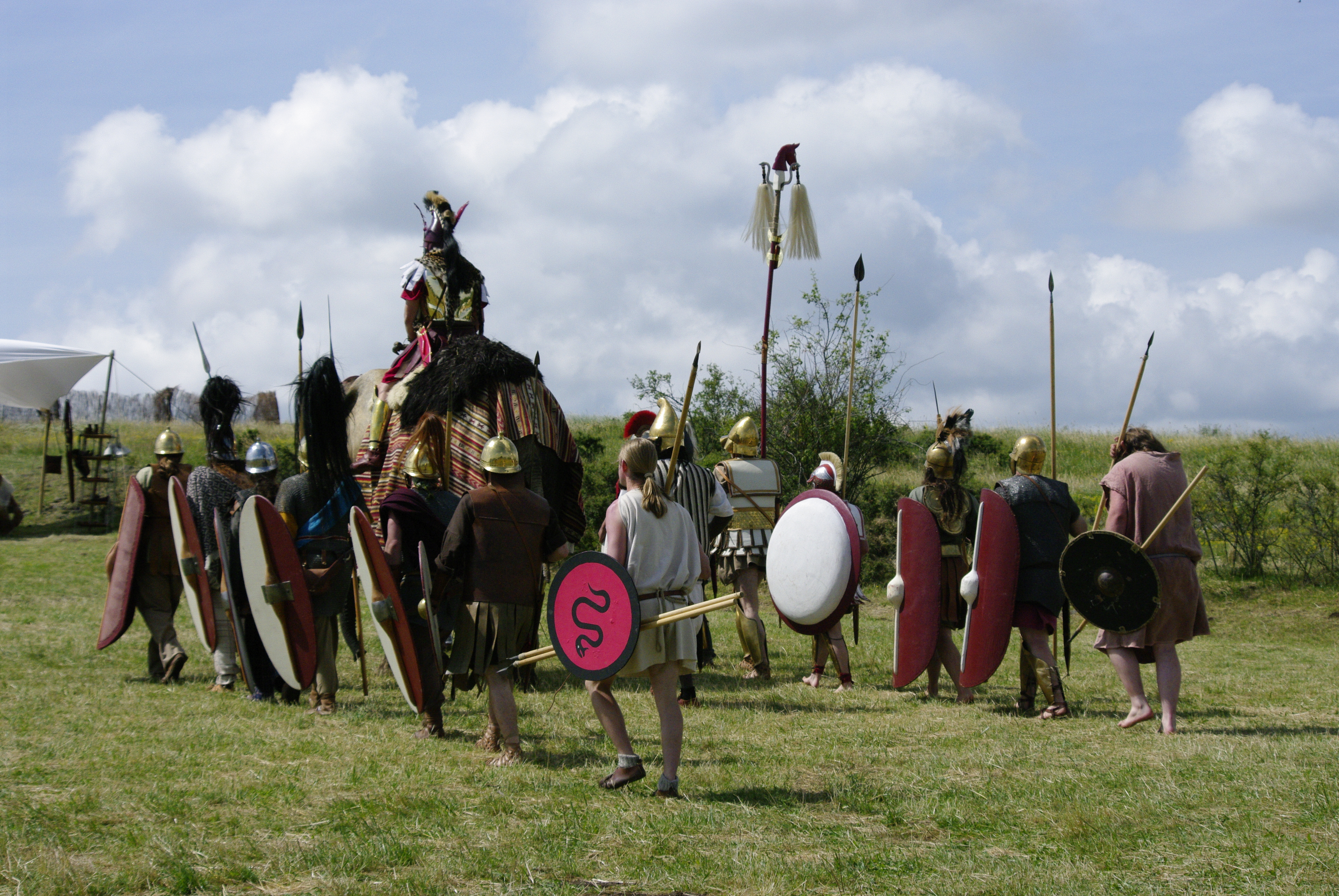
Modern recreations of Carthaginian soldiers and a war elephant at the 2012 Arverniales re-enactment

After the conclusion of the war in Sicily the 20,000 men of the Carthaginian army based there were evacuated in detachments to Carthage. Rather than promptly paying the several years' back pay they were owed and hurrying them home, the Carthaginian authorities decided to wait until all the troops had arrived and then attempt to negotiate a settlement at a lower rate. Freed of their long period of military discipline and with nothing to do, the men grumbled among themselves and refused all attempts by the Carthaginians to pay them less than the full amount due. Eventually, they forcibly took over the city of Tunis, approximately 15 km (9.3 mi) from the city of Carthage. Panicking, the Carthaginian Senate agreed to payment in full. The discontent seemed to have abated when discipline broke down. Several soldiers insisted that no deal with Carthage was acceptable, a riot broke out, dissenters were stoned to death, the Carthaginian negotiators were taken prisoner and their treasury was seized.

Spendius, an escaped Roman slave who faced death by torture if he were recaptured, and Mathos, a Berber dissatisfied with Hanno's attitude towards tax raising from Carthage's African possessions, were declared generals by the rebellious soldiers. The news of a formed, experienced, anti-Carthaginian army in the heart of Carthage's territory spread rapidly, and many cities and towns rose in rebellion. Provisions, money and reinforcements poured in – eventually an additional 70,000 men, according to the ancient Roman historian Polybius, although many would have been tied down in garrisoning their home towns against Carthaginian retribution. The pay dispute had become a full-scale revolt. The three years of war that followed are known as the Mercenary War and threatened Carthage's existence as a state.

== War ==
=== Opposing armies ===
Carthaginian armies were nearly always composed of foreigners; citizens only served in the army if there was a direct threat to the city of Carthage. Roman sources refer to these foreign fighters derogatively as "mercenaries", but the historian Adrian Goldsworthy describes this as "a gross oversimplification". They served under a variety of arrangements; for example, some were the regular troops of allied cities or kingdoms seconded to Carthage as part of formal arrangements. Most of these foreigners were from North Africa.

Libyans provided close-order infantry equipped with large shields, helmets, short swords and long thrusting spears; as well as close-order shock cavalry carrying spears (Note: "Shock" troops are those trained and used to close rapidly with an opponent, with the intention of breaking them before or immediately upon contact.) (also known as "heavy cavalry") – both were noted for their discipline and staying power. Numidians provided light cavalry who threw javelins from a distance and avoided close combat, and javelin-armed light infantry skirmishers. Both Spain and Gaul provided experienced infantry – unarmoured troops who would charge ferociously, but had a reputation for breaking off if a combat was protracted. Specialist slingers were recruited from the Balearic Islands. The close-order Libyan infantry and the citizen militia would fight in a tightly packed formation known as a phalanx. Sicilians and Italians were also recruited during the war to fill the ranks. The Carthaginians frequently employed war elephants; North Africa had indigenous African forest elephants at the time. (Note: These were typically about 2.5 metres (8 ft) high at the shoulder, and should not be confused with the larger African bush elephant. The sources are not clear as to whether they carried towers containing fighting men.)

=== Initial manoeuvres ===
Main manoeuvres during the Mercenary War

When the war broke out, Mathos ordered two groups of rebels north from Tunis to blockade the two main cities – other than Carthage – which had not already come over to the rebels: the major ports of Utica and Hippo (modern Bizerte). Hanno, as the commander of Carthage's African army, took the field with an army of 8,000–10,000 men and 100 war elephants. Most of the Africans in his force remained loyal; they were accustomed to acting against their fellow Africans. His non-African contingent also remained loyal. An unknown number of Carthaginian citizens were incorporated into this army.

In early 240 BC Hanno was defeated attempting to raise the siege of Utica at the battle of Utica. For the rest of the year Hanno skirmished with the rebel force, repeatedly missing opportunities to bring it to battle or to place it at a disadvantage; the military historian Nigel Bagnall writes of Hanno's "incompetence as a field commander". At some point during 240 BC the Carthaginians raised another army, of approximately 10,000 men. It included deserters from the rebels, 2,000 cavalry and 70 elephants, and was placed under the command of Hamilcar Barca, (Note: Father of Hannibal Barca, who won fame during the Second Punic War by crossing the Alps to invade Roman Italy.) who had previously led the Carthaginian forces in Sicily.

Hamilcar defeated a large rebel force at the battle of the Bagradas River and then brought various towns and cities which had gone over to the rebels back to Carthaginian allegiance with various mixtures of diplomacy and force. He was shadowed by a superior-sized rebel force under Spendius, which kept to rough ground for fear of the Carthaginians' cavalry and elephants, and harried his foragers and scouts. Meanwhile, Hanno manoeuvred against Mathos to the north near Hippo. South west of Utica Hamilcar moved his force into the mountains in an attempt to bring the rebels to battle, but was surrounded. He was only saved from destruction when an African leader, Naravas, who had served with and admired Hamilcar in Sicily, swapped sides with his 2,000 cavalry. This proved disastrous for the rebels, and in the resulting battle they lost 10,000 killed and 4,000 captured.

=== Truceless War ===
Since leaving Carthage, Hamilcar had treated rebels he had captured well and offered them a choice of joining his army or free passage home. He made the same offer to the 4,000 captives from the recent battle. Spendius perceived this generous treatment as the motivation behind Naravas's defection and feared the disintegration of his army; he was aware that such generous terms would not be extended to the rebel leaders. To remove the possibility of any goodwill between the sides, he had 700 Carthaginian prisoners tortured to death: they had their hands cut off, were castrated, had their legs broken, and were then thrown into a pit and buried alive. The Carthaginians, in turn, killed their prisoners. From this point, neither side showed any mercy, and the unusual ferocity of the fighting caused the near-contemporary historian Polybius to term it the "Truceless War". Any further prisoners taken by the Carthaginians were trampled to death by elephants.

At some point between March and September 239 BC the previously loyal cities of Utica and Hippo killed their Carthaginian garrisons and joined the rebels. Mathos and the rebels previously operating in the area moved south and combined with their comrades in Tunis. Having a clear superiority in cavalry, Hamilcar raided the supply lines of the rebels around Carthage. In early 238 BC the lack of supplies forced Mathos to lift the close siege of Carthage; he maintained a more distant blockade from Tunis.

While Mathos maintained the blockade, Spendius led 40,000 men against Hamilcar. After a period of campaigning, the details of which are not clear in the sources, the Carthaginians pinned the rebels in a pass or against a mountain range known as the Saw. Trapped in the mountains and with their food exhausted, the rebels ate their horses, their prisoners and then their slaves, hoping Mathos would sortie from Tunis to rescue them. Eventually, the surrounded troops forced their leaders, including Spendius, to parley with Hamilcar, who, on a thin pretext, took them prisoner. The Carthaginians then attacked the leaderless, starving rebels with their whole force, led by their elephants, and massacred the rebel army to a man in the battle of the Saw.

== Siege ==
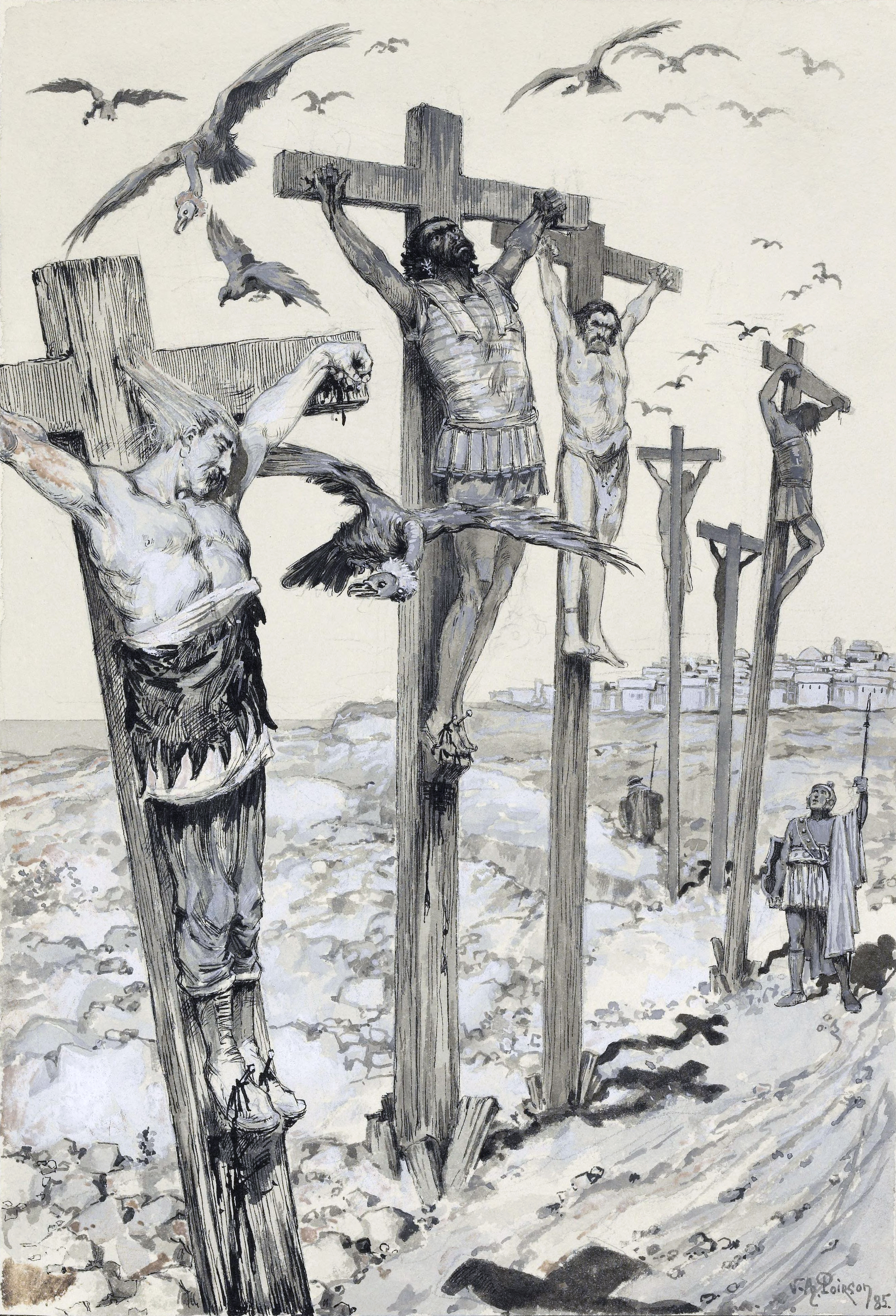
An illustration by Victor-Armand Poirson which envisages the crucifixion of Spendius and his lieutenants in front of Tunis

After their victory at the Saw the Carthaginians marched on the main rebel force at Tunis around October 238 BC, accepting the surrender of many towns and villages on the way. At Tunis, the Carthaginians had approximately 20,000 men and the rebel army was roughly the same size. Mathos was in command of the remaining rebels, and aware of the approach of the Carthaginian army. It was generally felt that Carthaginian victory was inevitable; the rebels could not surrender and there was nowhere to which they could flee offering more advantages than remaining at Tunis. The city was difficult to access; the sea lay to the east, while an approach from the west was hampered by a large salt marsh. Hamilcar occupied a position to the south with half the army, and his deputy Hannibal (Note: Not to be confused with Hannibal Barca, of Second Punic War fame.) was to the north with the balance. The rebels' camp was to the north of Tunis and immediately outside the walls.

The historian Dexter Hoyos notes that Hamilcar's dispositions are difficult to explain: To march from one of the Carthaginian camps to the other meant a march of 25 kilometres (16 mi) around the salt marsh and across hilly terrain, which made speedy mutual support by Hannibal and Hamilcar impossible. Hamilcar was dividing his forces in the face of an equally large enemy army and he risked defeat in detail. It is possible Mathos withdrew all or most of his 20,000 men from their camp into Tunis, which had stronger defences; this would have given the impression the rebels were predominately concerned with defence. Hoyos suggests that with their forces situated in fortified camps and fresh from their victory at the Saw, Hamilcar and Hannibal were confident of victory and were concentrating on cutting off possible avenues of escape. They would also have believed that their elephants and their cavalry superiority would continue to deter any rebel attack.

Having established a close siege of Tunis and the rebel camp, Hamilcar travelled from his base at the Carthaginians' southern camp to their northern camp with the ten rebel leaders captured at the Saw. There they were tortured and mutilated in a similar way to the 700 Carthaginian prisoners and their bodies crucified to the south of the camp, in clear sight of the rebels' camp. Observers were encouraged to travel from Carthage to view the bodies as a concrete sign of the successes of their generals. Hamilcar, satisfied that the constant sight of their dead leaders would complete the demoralisation of the rebels, returned to the southern camp.

Instead, the reminder that they would receive no mercy from the Carthaginians steeled the rebels for desperate measures. Hamilcar kept his force at a high state of readiness, in case of a rebel assault, but Hannibal was more confident and laxer in ensuring that his men were effective in their patrols and sentry duties. Observing this, Mathos determined to strike north in an attempt to break the siege. He organised a large-scale night attack. Although only a part of the rebel army participated, it surprised the Carthaginians and their northern camp was captured. Its occupants had little opportunity to don their armour and organise into units before being overrun by the rebels' assault. The Carthaginians suffered heavy casualties in dead and captured and lost all of their baggage and most of their troops' weapons, armour and personal equipment. Hannibal and a delegation of 30 Carthaginian notables who were visiting the army were captured.

Mathos removed his colleagues' bodies from their crosses for burial. Hannibal and the 30 senior Carthaginians were brutally tortured and then crucified, still breathing; Hannibal was nailed to the cross previously occupied by Spendius. They were then killed as part of Spendius's funeral rites. When news first reached Hamilcar of the attack, he set out to support Hannibal, but returned to his camp once he learned the northern camp had fallen. With half of his army lost and no blocking force to the north of the rebel camp his position was untenable. He abandoned the siege and withdrew to the north. Mathos let him go unmolested, possibly because he was afraid to oppose the Carthaginian elephants in an open battle.

== Aftermath ==
The supplies seized from the Carthaginian camp relieved the rebels' immediate problems, but little further food arrived, despite the siege having been lifted. Mathos decided he could not sustain the position in Tunis and led the army 160 km (100 mi) south to the wealthy port city of Leptis Parva (just south of the modern city of Monastir, Tunisia). This was the capital of the prosperous Byzacium region and had risen against Carthage earlier in the war. Hanno and Hamilcar marched after the rebels with an army totalling more than 25,000 men, including every Carthaginian citizen of military age, and many war elephants. At the ensuing Battle of Leptis Parva the rebels were crushed, with few losses to the Carthaginians. In a change of policy, prisoners were taken, which probably helped to ensure there was no desperate last stand. Captives were sold into slavery. Mathos was also captured, and he was dragged through the streets of Carthage and tortured to death by its citizens.

Most of the towns and cities which had not already come to terms with Carthage now did so, with the exceptions of Utica and Hippo, whose inhabitants feared vengeance for their massacre of Carthaginians. They attempted to hold out, but were besieged in March 237 BC and surrendered a few days later. The previously disaffected towns and cities were treated leniently, although Carthaginian governors were imposed on them.

== Notes, citations and sources ==
=== Sources ===
- Bagnall, Nigel (1999). The Punic Wars: Rome, Carthage and the Struggle for the Mediterranean. London: Pimlico. ISBN 978-0-7126-6608-4.
- Eckstein, Arthur (2017). "The First Punic War and After, 264–237 BC". The Encyclopedia of Ancient Battles. Vol. IV, The Macedonian Age and the Rise of Rome. Chichester, West Sussex: John Wiley & Sons. pp. 1–14. ISBN 978-1-4051-8645-2.
- Goldsworthy, Adrian (2006). The Fall of Carthage: The Punic Wars 265–146 BC. London: Phoenix. ISBN 978-0-304-36642-2.
- Hoyos, Dexter (2000). "Towards a Chronology of the 'Truceless War', 241–237 B.C." (PDF). Rheinisches Museum für Philologie. 143 (3/4): 369–380. JSTOR 41234468.
- Hoyos, Dexter (2007). Truceless War: Carthage's Fight for Survival, 241 to 237 BC. Leiden, South Holland; Boston, Massachusetts: Brill. ISBN 978-90-474-2192-4.
- Hoyos, Dexter (2015) [2011]. "Carthage in Africa and Spain, 241–218". In Hoyos, Dexter (ed.). A Companion to the Punic Wars. Chichester, West Sussex: John Wiley. pp. 204–222. ISBN 978-1-1190-2550-4.
- Jones, Archer (1987). The Art of War in the Western World. Urbana, Illinois: University of Illinois Press. ISBN 978-0-252-01380-5.
- Koon, Sam (2015) [2011]. "Phalanx and Legion: the "Face" of Punic War Battle". In Hoyos, Dexter (ed.). A Companion to the Punic Wars. Chichester, West Sussex: John Wiley. pp. 77–94. ISBN 978-1-1190-2550-4.
- Lazenby, John (1996). The First Punic War: A Military History. Stanford, California: Stanford University Press. ISBN 978-0-8047-2673-3.
- Miles, Richard (2011). Carthage Must be Destroyed. London: Penguin. ISBN 978-0-141-01809-6.
- Scullard, H. H. (1974). The Elephant in the Greek and Roman World. London: Thames and Hudson. ISBN 978-0-500-40025-8.
- Scullard, H. H. (2006) [1989]. "Carthage and Rome". In Walbank, F. W.; Astin, A. E.; Frederiksen, M. W. & Ogilvie, R. M. (eds.). Cambridge Ancient History: Volume 7, Part 2, 2nd Edition. Cambridge: Cambridge University Press. pp. 486–569. ISBN 978-0-521-23446-7.
- Warmington, Brian (1993) [1960]. Carthage. New York: Barnes & Noble, Inc. ISBN 978-1-56619-210-1.
