= Battle of the Saw =

238 BC battle of the Carthaginian Mercenary War in modern Tunisia

- Part of the Mercenary War
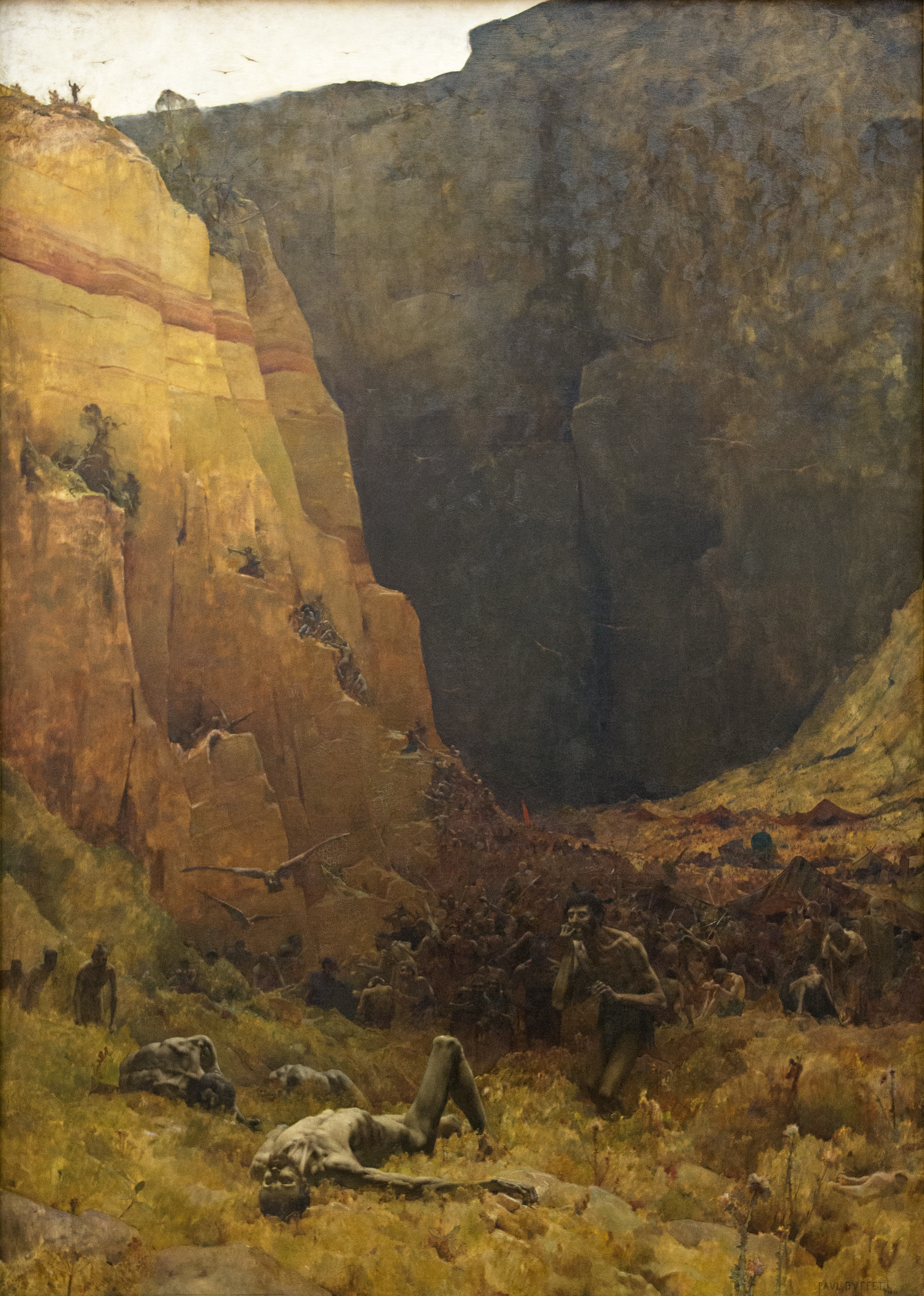
- The rebels starve in the area known as "the Saw", as envisaged by Paul Buffet in 1894.
Date	238 BC
Location	Unknown location in northern Tunisia
Result	Carthaginian victory

Belligerents
Carthage	Rebels

Commanders and leaders
Hamilcar Barca; Naravas	Spendius (executed); Zarzas (executed); Autaritus (executed)

Strength
20,000–30,000	50,000

Casualties and losses
Light	All rebels killed

The Battle of the Saw was the culminating battle of a campaign fought between a Carthaginian army led by Hamilcar Barca and a rebel force led by Spendius in 238 BC in what is now northern Tunisia. Carthage was fighting a coalition of mutinous soldiers and rebellious African cities in the Mercenary War which had started in 241 BC. The rebels had been besieging Carthage while the Carthaginian field army under Hamilcar raided their supply lines. Under this pressure the rebels pulled back to their base at Tunis and despatched their own army to prevent Hamilcar's activities and, ideally, destroy his army.

Unable to confront the Carthaginian war elephants and cavalry on open ground, the rebels stayed on higher and rougher terrain and harassed the Carthaginian army. After several months of campaigning, the details of which are not clear in the sources, Hamilcar trapped the rebels in a pass or against a mountain range. Pinned against the mountains, their supply lines blockaded and with their food exhausted, the rebels ate their horses, their prisoners and then their slaves, hoping that their comrades in Tunis would sortie to rescue them. Eventually, the surrounded troops forced their leaders to parley with Hamilcar, but he took all of them prisoner. The Carthaginians then attacked the leaderless, starving rebels with their whole force, led by their elephants, and massacred them to a man.

The rebel leaders were crucified in sight of their comrades in Tunis. A little later the rebels abandoned Tunis and withdrew south. Hamilcar and fellow general Hanno followed and in late 238 BC wiped them out at the Battle of Leptis Parva.

== Background ==
The First Punic War was fought between Carthage and Rome, the two main powers of the western Mediterranean in the 3rd century BC, and lasted for 23 years, from 264 to 241 BC. The two powers struggled for supremacy primarily on the Mediterranean island of Sicily and its surrounding waters, and also in North Africa. After immense materiel and human losses on both sides, the Carthaginians were defeated and their commander on Sicily agreed the Treaty of Lutatius.

During the last years of the war with Rome, the Carthaginian general Hanno the Great was leading a series of campaigns which greatly increased the area of Africa controlled by Carthage. Hanno was rigorous in squeezing taxes out of the newly conquered territory to pay for both the war with Rome and his own campaigns. Half of the area's agricultural output was taken as war tax, and the tribute previously due from towns and cities was doubled. These exactions were harshly enforced, causing extreme hardship in many areas.

=== Mutiny ===
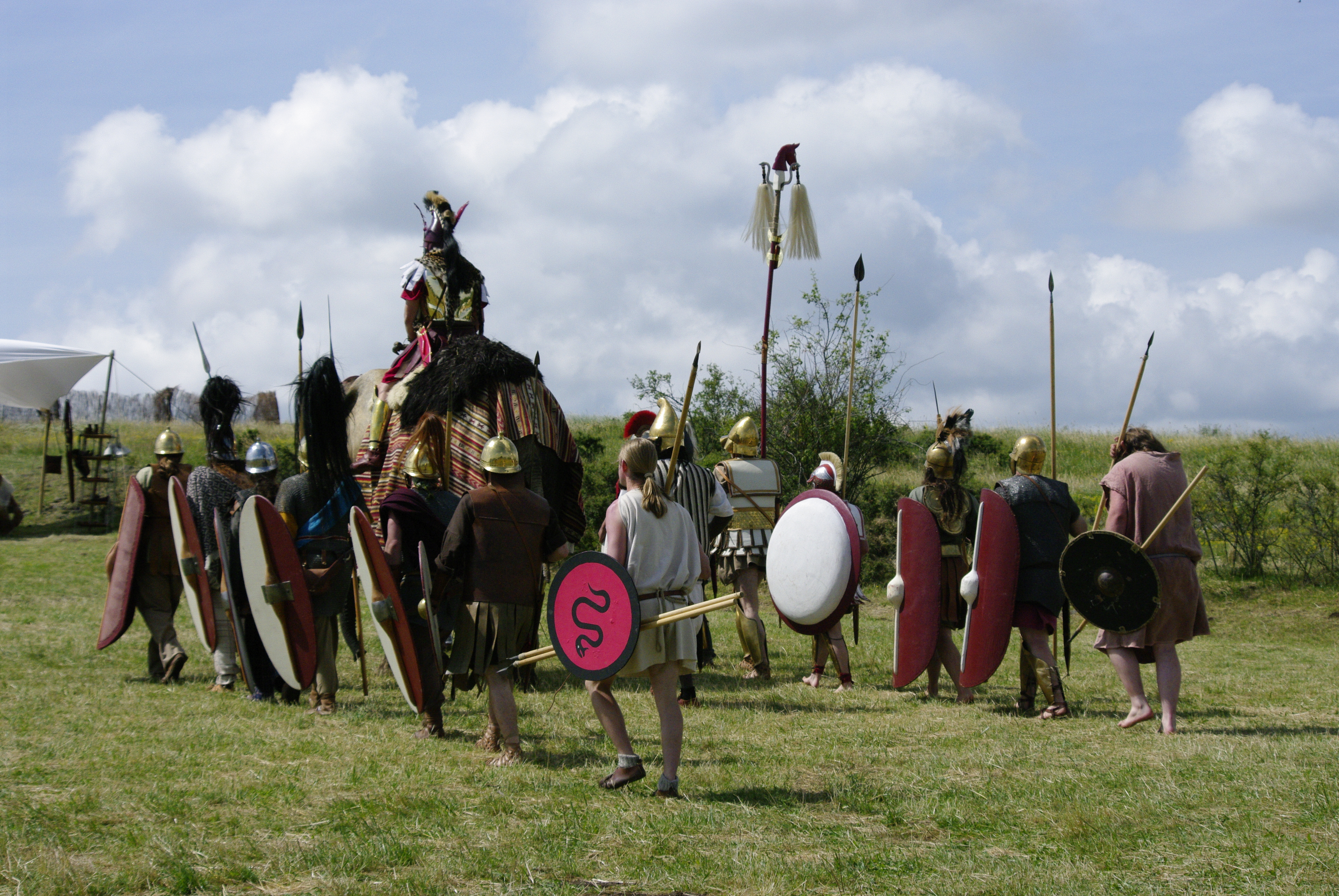
Modern recreations of Carthaginian soldiers and a war elephant at the 2012 Arverniales re-enactment

Following the Carthaginian defeat by the Romans, their army of 20,000 men on Sicily was evacuated to Carthage. Rather than promptly paying the several years' back pay they were owed and hurrying them home, the Carthaginian authorities decided to wait until all of the troops had arrived and then attempt to negotiate a settlement at a lower rate. Freed of their long period of military discipline and with nothing to do, the men grumbled among themselves and refused all attempts by the Carthaginians to pay them less than the full amount due. Eventually they forcibly took over the city of Tunis. Panicking, the Carthaginian Senate agreed to payment in full. This seemed to have abated the discontent when, suddenly, discipline broke down. Several soldiers insisted that no deal with Carthage was acceptable, a riot broke out, dissenters were stoned to death, the Senate's negotiators were taken prisoner and their treasury was seized.

Spendius, an escaped Roman slave who faced death by torture if he were recaptured, and Mathos, a Berber dissatisfied with Hanno's attitude towards tax-raising from Carthage's African possessions, were declared generals. The news of an experienced, anti-Carthaginian army in the heart of Carthage's territory spread rapidly and caused many cities and towns to rise in rebellion. Provisions, money and reinforcements poured in; eventually another 70,000 men joined the anti-Carthaginian movement, according to the ancient historian Polybius, although many would have been tied down in garrisoning their home towns against Carthaginian retribution. The pay dispute had become a full-scale revolt. The three years of war that followed are known as the Mercenary War and threatened Carthage's existence as a state.

== War ==
Main manoeuvres during the Mercenary War.; The numeral "5" indicates the location of the Battle of the Bagradas River; "6" is broadly indicative of the Carthaginian manoeuvres leading up to the Battle of the Saw; "7" represents the Battle of the Saw, although the location is extremely approximate.

The main rebel force blockaded Carthage from their stronghold of Tunis, while Mathos ordered two groups of rebels north to besiege the two main cities – other than Carthage – that had not already rebelled: the major ports of Utica and Hippo (modern Bizerte). Hanno, as the commander of Carthage's African army, took the field with an army of 8,000–10,000 men and 100 war elephants. Most of the Africans in his force remained loyal; they were accustomed to acting against their fellow Africans. His non-African contingent also remained loyal. An unknown number of Carthaginian citizens were incorporated into this army.

In early 240 BC Hanno was defeated at the Battle of Utica, while attempting to raise the siege of that city. For the rest of the year Hanno skirmished with the rebel force, repeatedly missing opportunities to bring it to battle or to place it at a disadvantage; the military historian Nigel Bagnall writes of Hanno's "incompetence as a field commander". At some point during 240 BC the Carthaginians raised another army, of approximately 10,000. It included deserters from the rebels, 2,000 cavalry, and 70 elephants, and was placed under the command of Hamilcar Barca, (Note: Father of Hannibal Barca, who won fame during the Second Punic War by crossing the Alps to invade Roman Italy.) who had previously led the Carthaginian forces on Sicily.

Hamilcar defeated a large rebel force at the Battle of the Bagradas River and then brought several towns and cities which had gone over to the rebels back to Carthaginian allegiance with a mixture of diplomacy and force. He was shadowed by a larger rebel force under Spendius, which kept to rough ground for fear of the Carthaginians' cavalry and elephants, and harried his foragers and scouts. Meanwhile, Hanno maneuvered against Mathos to the north near Hippo. Southwest of Utica, Hamilcar moved his force into the mountains in an attempt to bring the rebels to battle, but was surrounded. He was only saved from destruction when an African leader, Naravas, who had served with and admired Hamilcar in Sicily, deserted the rebels with his 2,000 cavalry and they joined Hamilcar. This proved disastrous for the rebels, and in the resulting battle they lost 10,000 killed and 4,000 captured.

=== Truceless War ===
Since leaving Carthage, Hamilcar had treated rebels he had captured well and offered them a choice of joining his army or free passage home. He made the same offer to the 4,000 captives from the recent battle. Spendius perceived this generous treatment as the motivation behind Naravas's defection and feared the disintegration of his army; he was aware that such generous terms would not be extended to the rebel leaders. Encouraged by his senior subordinates, notably the Gaul Autaritus, to remove the possibility of any goodwill between the sides, he had 700 Carthaginian prisoners tortured to death: they had their hands cut off, their legs broken, were castrated, and were thrown into a pit and buried alive. The Carthaginians, in turn, killed their prisoners. From this point, neither side showed any mercy, and the unusual ferocity of the fighting caused Polybius to term it the "Truceless War".

At some point between March and September 239 BC the previously loyal cities of Utica and Hippo slew their Carthaginian garrisons and joined the rebels. Mathos and the rebels previously operating in the area moved south and joined their comrades in Tunis. Hanno was recalled to Carthage and in mid-239 BC Hamilcar was appointed supreme commander. Having a clear superiority in cavalry, Hamilcar raided the supply lines of the rebels around Carthage. In early 238 BC the lack of supplies forced Mathos to lift the close siege of Carthage; he maintained a more distant blockade from Tunis.

== Opposing armies ==
Carthaginian armies were nearly always composed of foreigners; citizens only served in the army if there was a direct threat to the city of Carthage. Roman sources refer to these foreign fighters derogatively as "mercenaries", but the modern historian Adrian Goldsworthy describes this as "a gross oversimplification". They served under a variety of arrangements; for example, some were the regular troops of allied cities or kingdoms seconded to Carthage as part of formal arrangements. The largest single component of these foreigners, by some way, was from North Africa.

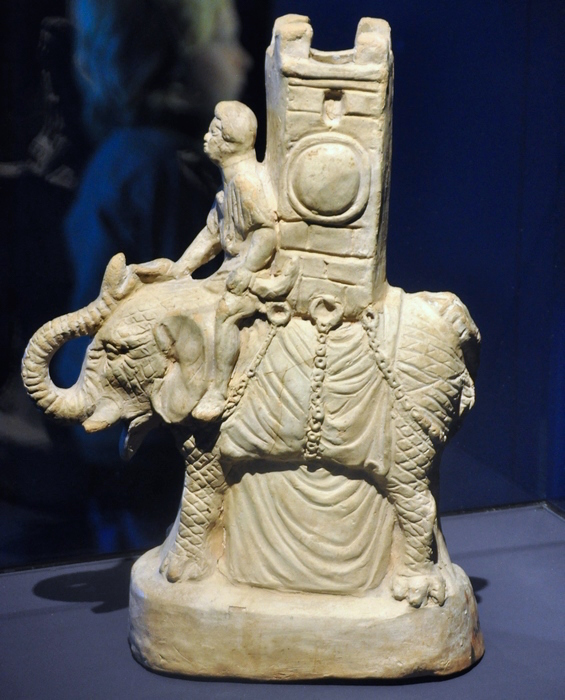
Roman statuette of a war elephant, recovered from Pompeii

Libyans provided close-order infantry equipped with large shields, helmets, short swords and long thrusting spears, as well as close-order shock cavalry carrying spears (Note: "Shock" troops are those trained and used to close rapidly with an opponent, with the intention of breaking them before or immediately upon contact.) (also known as "heavy cavalry") – both were noted for their discipline and staying power. Numidians provided light cavalry who threw javelins from a distance and avoided close combat, and javelin-armed light infantry skirmishers. Both Iberia and Gaul provided experienced infantry; unarmoured troops who would charge ferociously, but had a reputation for breaking off if a combat was protracted. Specialist slingers were recruited from the Balearic Islands. The close-order Libyan infantry and the citizen militia would fight in a tightly packed formation known as a phalanx. Sicilians, Greeks and Italians had also joined up during the war to fill the ranks. The Carthaginians frequently employed war elephants; North Africa had indigenous African forest elephants at the time. (Note: These were typically about 2.5 metres (8 ft) high at the shoulder, and should not be confused with the larger African bush elephant. The sources are not clear as to whether they carried towers containing fighting men.)

The rebel field army which commenced the campaign is estimated to have been about 50,000 strong, leaving the 20,000-man balance of their force to continue blockading Carthage from their stronghold of Tunis. The 50,000 included the large majority of the surviving experienced veterans of the army of Sicily, although the bulk were more recent recruits. Most of this force was infantry; their cavalry component was both smaller than that of the Carthaginians and of poorer quality and the rebels lacked elephants entirely. The total strength of the Carthaginians is not known, but has been estimated at more than 20,000 men, possibly as many as 30,000, all experienced veterans, as well as a large but unknown number of elephants.

== Campaign ==
=== Manoeuvres ===
The rebel situation was not sustainable, as their large army in Tunis was running out of supplies. The bulk of their force was despatched to prevent Hamilcar's raids and, ideally, destroy his army. Spendius was a general of this expedition; Autaritus and a certain Zarzas, whose background is unknown, were either co-commanders or senior subordinate generals. The Carthaginians were probably organised in three divisions: one under Hamilcar, one under his senior subordinate general Hannibal, (Note: Not to be confused with Hannibal Barca of Second Punic War fame.) and the third a strong cavalry force commanded by Naravas.

The rebels succeeded in driving off Hamilcar's force, and so opened up a route for supplies to reach both themselves and their comrades in Tunis, but the primary sources do not state how this was accomplished. The rebel field army marched out and Hamilcar pulled his divisions together and followed them into the Tunisian uplands. As in the previous year, the rebels mostly kept to higher and rougher terrain, where the Carthaginian elephants and cavalry could not operate effectively, and harassed the Carthaginian army. They hoped to cause the Carthaginians supply problems and either lure them onto ground of the rebels' choice where their greater numbers of infantry could tell or isolate one of the Carthaginian divisions and defeat it in detail. This plan is described by the historian Dexter Hoyos as "extraordinarily risky tactics".

The primary sources give a confusing account of the subsequent months-long campaign of manoeuvre, with ambushes, traps, stratagems and much marching and counter-marching. Both sides had mixed fortunes, each losing some of the clashes and suffering losses in men killed, wounded and taken prisoner. Broadly this was to the rebels' advantage, if they could keep their army intact the Carthaginian strength would shrink; they had no need, nor desire, to risk a pitched battle. The rebels could more readily afford a battle of attrition. Hamilcar, in contrast, was under pressure to both bring the campaign to a rapid conclusion and to not be drawn too far from his base at Carthage. Hamilcar had the advantages of his soldiers being – on average – more experienced, his elephants and cavalry, and his own greater experience as a general. He had been almost continuously in command of an army for a decade, while the rebel generals had at best experience as junior officers – Spendius was an escaped slave turned ordinary soldier. The rebel commanders led an effective campaign, but they could not match Hamilcar's experience. In keeping with the savage nature of the war Hamilcar had all prisoners executed, whenever possible by being trampled to death by elephants. This had the counter-productive effect of encouraging the rebels to fight on, even in the most trying of circumstances. The rebels spared, but enslaved, any Carthaginians captured.

=== Trap ===
Eventually Hamilcar trapped the rebels in a pass or pinned them against a mountain range; some nearby hills or mountains were known as "the Saw" because of the supposed likeness of their outline to the tool. Hoyos suggests that the rebels had relaxed their guard in a supposedly secure area believing that they had broken contact with the Carthaginians, but that Naravas's skilled scouts identified their location. They were then surprised by Hamilcar, and deterred from immediate attack by his elephants and cavalry superiority. By the time they had grasped the situation the Carthaginian army had fortified itself in positions where the terrain was what Polybius describes as "unhelpful" to the rebels and any attack by them was clearly hopeless. The rebels at this point were estimated to still be more than 40,000 strong, excluding slaves and prisoners. They had access to water but none to food, and had likely already foraged the immediate area bare. The Carthaginians could move freely to gather food from a wide area.

Pinned against mountains and with their food exhausted, over several weeks the rebels ate their horses, their prisoners and then their slaves. Several messengers were despatched to Tunis; it is not known if any got through. The rebels hung on, hoping that Mathos would sortie from Tunis to rescue them. Whether or not Mathos was informed of events, he did not move. Possibly he was not informed, or possibly he felt pinned in place by the 10,000 defenders of Carthage under Hanno. The surrounded troops blamed their leaders for their situation and eventually they were forced to attempt a parley with Hamilcar. Hamilcar took Spendius, Autaritus, Zarzas and their lieutenants prisoner and the Carthaginians then attacked the leaderless, starving rebels with their whole force, led by their elephants. All of the rebels were killed; any who surrendered were thrown under the feet of the elephants. Carthaginian casualties were light.

== Aftermath ==
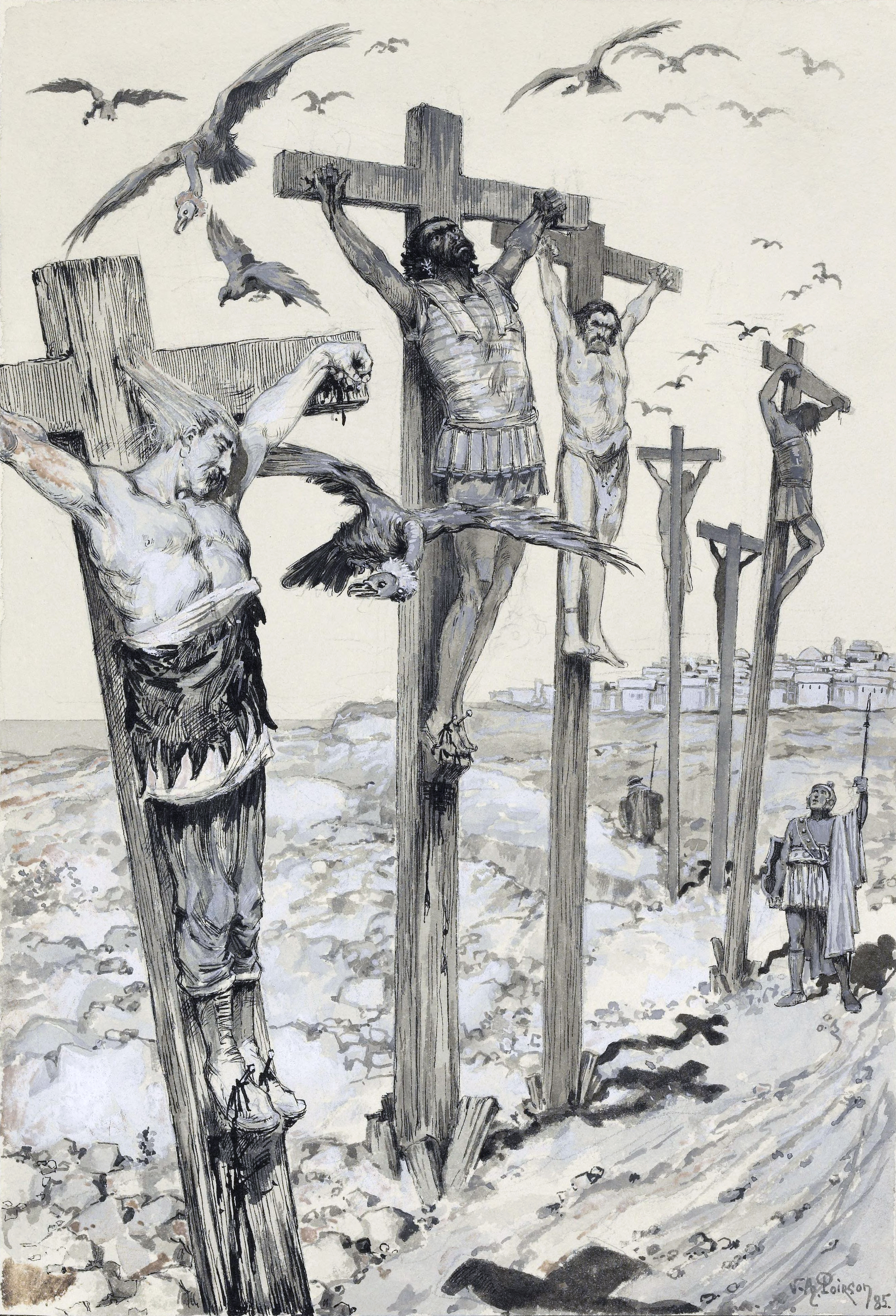
19th century French illustrator Victor-Armand Poirson envisages the crucifixion of Spendius and his lieutenants in front of Tunis.

Hamilcar then marched on Tunis and laid siege to it in late 238 BC. The city was difficult to access from both the east and the west, so Hamilcar occupied a position to the south with half the army, and his deputy Hannibal was to the north with the balance. The rebel leaders taken captive prior to the Saw were crucified in full view of the city. Mathos ordered a large-scale night attack, which surprised the Carthaginians, who suffered many casualties. One of their camps was overrun and they lost much of their baggage; Hannibal and a delegation of 30 Carthaginian notables who were visiting the army were captured. They were tortured and then nailed to the crosses previously occupied by Spendius and his colleagues. Hamilcar abandoned the siege and withdrew to the north.

Mathos led the rebel army 160 kilometres (100 mi) south to the wealthy port city of Leptis Parva (just south of the modern city of Monastir, Tunisia). Hanno and Hamilcar marched after the rebels with an army totalling over 25,000 men and many war elephants, including every Carthaginian citizen of military age. At the ensuing battle the rebels were crushed. Captives were sold into slavery. Mathos was captured; he was dragged through the streets of Carthage and tortured to death by its citizens.

Most of the towns and cities which had not already come to terms with Carthage now did so, with the exceptions of Utica and Hippo, whose inhabitants feared vengeance for their massacre of Carthaginians. They attempted to hold out, but Polybius says that they too "quickly" surrendered, probably in late 238 BC or very early 237 BC. The surrendered towns and cities were treated leniently, although Carthaginian governors were imposed on them.
