= Spendius =

Anti-Carthaginian rebel general active 241–238 BC

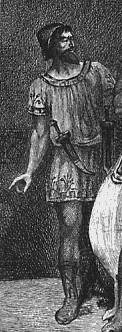
- Spendius, as envisaged by Victor Armand Poirson in 1890
- Born: Campania
- Died: 238 BC; Tunis
- Allegiance: Carthaginian Empire (until 241 BC); Anti-Carthaginian rebels (from 241 BC)
- Service / branch: Carthaginian Army; North African rebel army
- Rank: General
- Battles / wars: First Punic War; Mercenary War; Battle of Utica; Battle of the Bagradas River; Hamilcar's victory with Naravas; Battle of The Saw

Spendius (died late 238 BC) was a former Roman slave who led a rebel army against Carthage, in what is known as the Mercenary War. He escaped or was rescued from slavery in Campania and was recruited into the Carthaginian Army during the First Punic War at some point prior to 241 BC. Spendius's date of birth is unknown, as are most details of his activities prior to his coming to prominence as a mutineer in 241 BC. After the First Punic War, Carthage attempted to pay its soldiers less than the full amount due to them before demobilising them. Spendius faced death by torture if he were returned to Roman authority and took a dim view of the increasingly warm relationship between Carthage and Rome. He came to the fore as a member of the army most vocal in resisting Carthaginian efforts to settle the dispute. When the disagreement broke down into a full-scale mutiny in late 241 BC he was elected co-general with the African Mathos by his fellow mutineers. Mathos spread the news of the mutiny to the main African settlements under Carthaginian suzerainty and they rose in rebellion. Provisions, money and 70,000 reinforcements poured in. For four years Spendius led a rebel army against Carthage, in what is known as the Mercenary War, with mixed success.

In 238 BC Spendius led 40,000 men against the Carthaginian general Hamilcar, keeping to the higher and rougher terrain due to the Carthaginian superiority in cavalry and elephants, and harassed the Carthaginian army. His army became trapped in a pass or mountain range known as the Saw. Pinned against mountains and with their food exhausted, the rebels ate their horses, their prisoners and then their slaves, hoping that Mathos would sortie to rescue them. Eventually, the surrounded troops forced Spendius to parley with Hamilcar, but on a thin pretext Hamilcar took Spendius and his lieutenants prisoner. The rebels then attempted to fight their way out in the Battle of the Saw and were massacred to a man. Spendius and his colleagues were crucified in view of the rebel-held city of Tunis. Mathos ordered a large-scale night attack, which captured a senior Carthaginian general and a visiting delegation of 30 Carthaginian notables. They were tortured and then nailed to the crosses previously occupied by Spendius and his colleagues. Later that year the surviving rebels were crushed at the Battle of Leptis Parva.

== Background ==
Spendius was a Roman slave from Campania who escaped from his slavery, or was rescued from it; the ancient historian Polybius described him as a "slave deserter from the Romans". He was recruited into the Carthaginian Army during the First Punic War (264–241 BC) at some point prior to 241 BC. Spendius's date of birth is unknown, as are most details of his activities prior to his coming to prominence as a mutineer in 241 BC.

== End of the First Punic War and mutiny ==
In 241 BC the First Punic War between Carthage and Rome ended after 23 years. The Romans had defeated a Carthaginian fleet attempting to lift the blockade of its last strongholds on Sicily. With their relief effort repulsed, the Carthaginian Senate accepted defeat and ordered their commander on Sicily, Hamilcar Barca, to negotiate a peace treaty with the Romans, on whatever terms he could obtain. Instead, Hamilcar left Sicily in a rage, convinced that the surrender was unnecessary. The negotiation of the treaty and the subsequent evacuation of the Carthaginian army of 20,000 men from Sicily was left in the hands of Gisco. Not wishing the freshly idle soldiers to combine for purposes of their own, Gisco split the army into small detachments based on their regions of origin. He sent these back to Carthage one at a time. He anticipated they would be promptly paid the several years' back pay they were owed and hurried on their way home.

The Carthaginian authorities decided to instead wait until all of the troops had arrived and then attempt to negotiate a settlement at a lower rate. Meanwhile, as each group landed it was billeted inside the city of Carthage where the advantages of civilisation were appreciated to the full after up to eight years under siege. This "tumultuous licentiousness" so alarmed the city's authorities that before the full 20,000 had arrived they were relocated to Sicca Veneria (modern El Kef), 180 kilometres (110 mi) away, even though a significant portion of their arrears had to be paid before they would go. Freed of their long period of military discipline and with nothing to do, the men grumbled among themselves and refused all attempts by the Carthaginians to pay them less than the full amount due. It was at this point that a junior officer named Mathos came to prominence as one of the most outspoken of the 20,000-strong army; he was totally opposed to anything less than full payment, including the fulfilment of all verbal promises.

The leading Carthaginian negotiator was their senior general in Africa, Hanno. Over the previous ten years he had led a series of campaigns which greatly increased the area of Africa controlled by Carthage. Hanno was rigorous in squeezing taxes out of the newly conquered territory in order to pay for both the war with Rome and his own campaigns. Half of all agricultural output was taken as war tax, and the tribute previously due from towns and cities had been doubled. These exactions were harshly enforced, causing extreme hardship in many areas. A large part of the army, possibly the majority, were from Carthage's North African possessions and were, to a greater or lesser degree, dissatisfied with Carthage's treatment of its African subjects. These non-Carthaginian North Africans were deeply dissatisfied with Hanno's attitude towards tax raising and may also have believed that once the army was paid off and they returned home there would have been no obstacle to Carthage continuing, or even increasing, its exactions. Mathos became the recalcitrant spokesman for this group. He was vocally supported by Spendius, who faced death by torture if he were returned to Roman authority. The treaty which ended the war required Carthage to return all "Roman deserters" and Spendius took a dim view of the increasingly warm relationship between Carthage and Rome; he allied with Mathos and roused the non-African soldiery to refuse all Carthaginian efforts to settle the dispute.

In mid- or late September 241 BC, frustrated by the Carthaginian negotiators' attempts to haggle, all 20,000 troops marched to Tunis, 16 km (10 mi) from Carthage. Panicking, the Senate agreed to payment in full. The mutinous troops responded by demanding even more. Gisco, who had a good reputation with the army, was brought over from Sicily in late 241 BC and despatched to the camp with enough money to pay most of what was owed. He started to disburse this, with promises that the balance would be paid as soon as it could be raised. The discontent seemed to have abated until Spendius and Mathos stirred up the North African contingent with a vision of the Carthaginians wreaking vengeance on them once their comrades had been sent home and their discipline broke down. A riot broke out, dissenters were stoned to death, and Spendius and Mathos were jointly declared generals by the mutineers. After further, fruitless, negotiations Gisco and his staff were taken prisoner and his treasury was seized.

Mathos sent messengers to the main African settlements under Carthaginian suzerainty with the news that a formed, experienced, anti-Carthaginian army now existed in the heart of its territory and many cities and towns rose in rebellion. Provisions, money and reinforcements poured in; eventually an additional 70,000 men according to the ancient historian of Rome, Polybius, although many would have been tied down in garrisoning their home towns against Carthaginian retribution. Almost all of Carthaginian Africa joined the mutineers. The pay dispute had become a full-scale revolt, the Mercenary War, threatening Carthage's existence as a state.

== War ==
=== Against Hanno ===
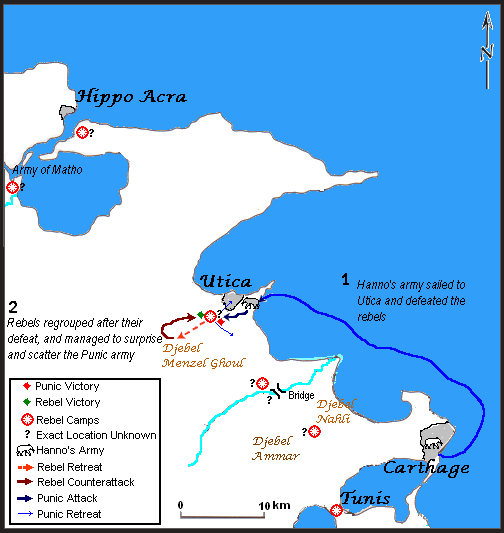
The Battle of Utica

Hanno, as the commander of Carthage's African army, took the field. Most of the Africans in his force remained loyal; they were accustomed to acting against their fellow Africans. His non-African contingent had remained quartered in Carthage when the army of Sicily was expelled, and also remained loyal. The few troops still in Sicily were paid up to date and redeployed with Hanno, and money was raised to hire fresh troops. An unknown number of Carthaginian citizens were incorporated into Hanno's army. By the time Hanno assembled this force, the rebels had already blockaded the major Carthaginian port cities of Utica and Hippo (modern Bizerte); Spendius was in charge of operations around Utica, Mathos around Hippo.

In early 240 BC Hanno set off with the army to relieve Utica; he took with him 100 elephants and a siege train. (Note: The military historian Nigel Bagnall questions the utility of the siege train, as the rebels held no towns which could be besieged.) Hanno stormed Spendius's camp in the Battle of Utica and his elephants routed the besiegers. Hanno's army took over the camp and Hanno himself entered the city in triumph. However, Spendius regrouped the battle-hardened veterans of the Sicilian army in the nearby hills and, not being pursued, led them back to Utica. The Carthaginians were accustomed to fighting the militias of the Numidian cities, who once broken would scatter in all directions; they were still celebrating their victory when Spendius counter-attacked. The Carthaginians fled, with great loss of life, losing their baggage and siege trains. For the rest of the year Hanno skirmished with Spendius's force, repeatedly missing opportunities to bring it to battle or to place it at a disadvantage; the military historian Nigel Bagnall writes that Hanno showed his "incompetence as a field commander".

=== Against Hamilcar ===
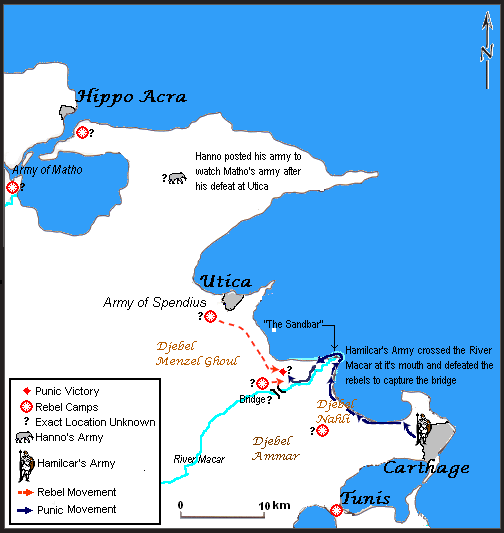
The Battle of the Bagradas River

At some point during 240 BC the Carthaginians raised another, smaller, force, of approximately 10,000. It included deserters from the rebels, 2,000 cavalry, and 70 elephants. This was placed under the command of Hamilcar, who had commanded the Carthaginian forces on Sicily for the last six years of the First Punic War. The rebels held the line of the Bagradas River with 10,000 men commanded by Spendius. Hamilcar would need to force a crossing if he were to gain access to open country where he could manoeuvre. He did so by a stratagem, and Spendius was reinforced by an additional 15,000 men drawn from the force laying siege to Utica, which the rebels had renewed. The rebel army of 25,000 moved to attack Hamilcar in the Battle of the Bagradas River. What happened next is unclear: it seems Hamilcar feigned a retreat and the rebels broke ranks to pursue; it is not recorded if this was ordered by Spendius or was against his wishes. The Carthaginians turned in good order and counter-attacked, routing the rebels, who suffered losses of 8,000 men.

Hamilcar was appointed joint commander of the Carthaginian army, alongside Hanno, but there was no cooperation between the two. While Hanno manoeuvred against Mathos to the north near Hippo, Hamilcar confronted various towns and cities which had gone over to the rebels, bringing them back to Carthaginian allegiance with varying mixtures of diplomacy and force. He was shadowed by a superior-sized rebel force commanded by Spendius, which kept to rough ground for fear of Hamilcar's cavalry and elephants, and harried his foragers and scouts. South west of Utica Hamilcar moved his force into the mountains in an attempt to bring the rebels to battle, but was surrounded. The Carthaginians were saved from destruction only when a Numidian leader, Naravas, who had served with and admired Hamilcar in Sicily, swapped sides with his 2,000 cavalry. This proved disastrous for the rebels, and in the resulting battle Spendius's army was defeated, losing 10,000 killed and 4,000 captured.

=== Truceless War ===
Main manoeuvres during the war

Since leaving Carthage, Hamilcar had treated rebels he had captured well and offered them a choice of joining his army or free passage home. He made the same offer to the 4,000 captives from the recent battle. Spendius perceived this generous treatment as the motivation behind Naravas's defection and feared the disintegration of his army; he was aware that such generous terms would not be extended to him personally. To remove the possibility of any goodwill between the sides, he had 700 Carthaginian prisoners, including Gisco, tortured to death: they had their hands cut off, were castrated, had their legs broken and were thrown into a pit and buried alive. Hamilcar, in turn, killed his prisoners. From this point, neither side showed any mercy, and the unusual ferocity of the fighting caused Polybius to term it the "Truceless War". Any further prisoners taken by the Carthaginians were trampled to death by elephants.

At some point between March and September 239 BC the previously loyal cities of Utica and Hippo slew their Carthaginian garrisons and joined the rebels. The people of Utica offered their city to the Romans, who declined. The rebels previously operating in the area moved south and laid siege to Carthage.

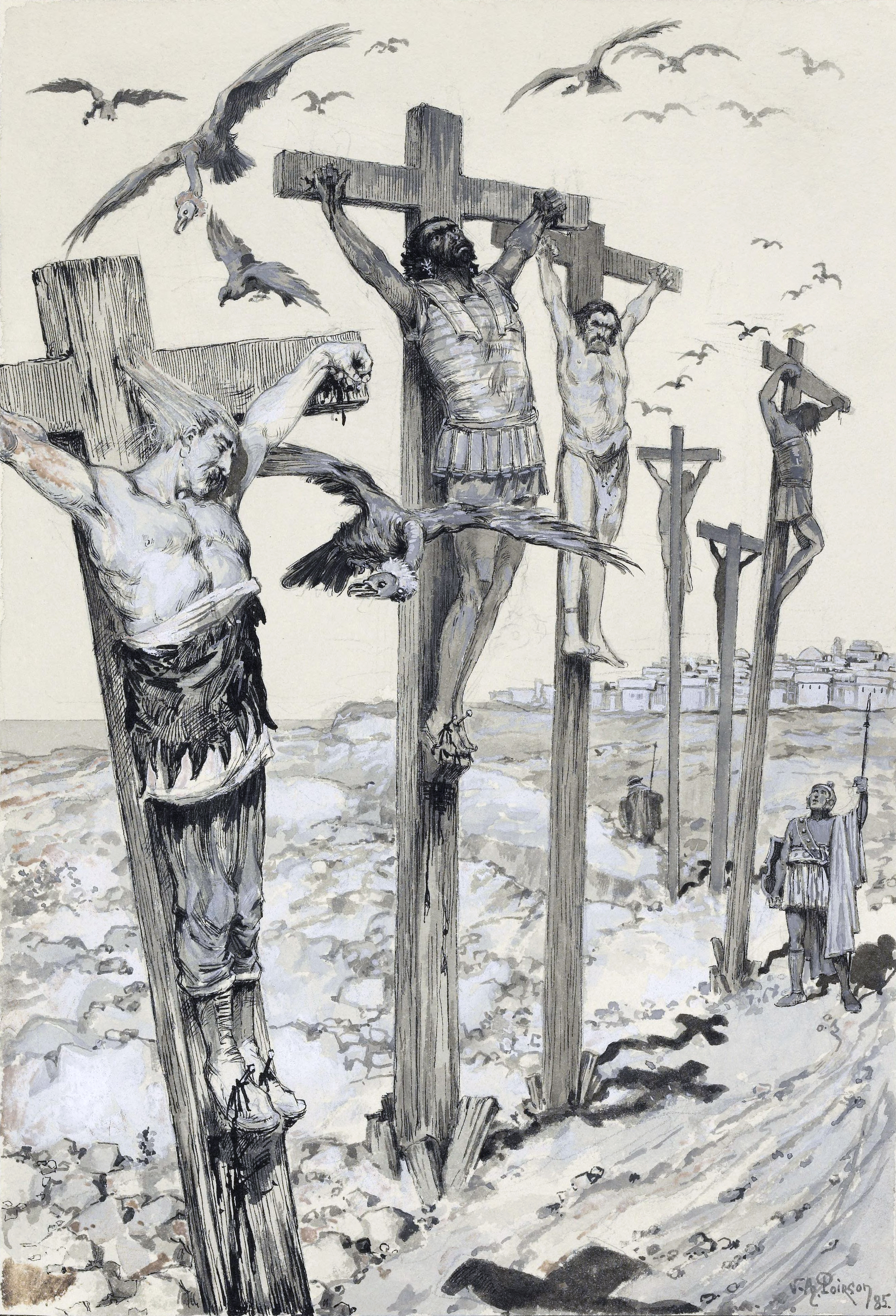
An illustration by Victor-Armand Poirson which envisages the crucifixion of Spendius and his lieutenants in front of Tunis.

Having a clear superiority in cavalry, Hamilcar raided the supply lines of the rebels around Carthage. In mid-239 BC he was joined by Hanno and his army, but the two men disagreed as to the best strategy and operations were paralysed. Unusually, the choice of supreme commander was put to a vote of the army – possibly only the officers – and Hamilcar was elected; Hanno left the army. In early 238 BC the lack of supplies forced Mathos and Spendius to lift the siege of Carthage. They fell back to Tunis, from where they maintained a more distant blockade.While Mathos maintained the blockade, Spendius led 40,000 men against Hamilcar. As in the previous year, they stayed to the higher and rougher terrain and harassed the Carthaginian army. After a period of campaigning, the details of which are not clear in the sources, Hamilcar trapped the rebels in a pass or mountain range known as the Saw. Pinned against mountains and with their food exhausted, the rebels ate their horses, their prisoners and then their slaves, hoping that Mathos would sortie from Tunis to rescue them. Eventually, the surrounded troops forced Spendius to parley with Hamilcar, but on a thin pretext Hamilcar took Spendius and his lieutenants prisoner. The rebels then attempted to fight their way out in the Battle of the Saw and were massacred to a man.

Hamilcar then marched on Tunis and laid siege to it in late 238 BC. The city was difficult to access from both the east and the west, so Hamilcar occupied a position to the south with half the army, and his deputy Hannibal (Note: Not to be confused with Hannibal of Second Punic War fame, the son of Hamilcar Barca.) was to the north with the balance. The rebel leaders taken captive prior to the Saw, including Spendius, were crucified in full view of the city. Mathos ordered a large-scale night attack, which surprised the Carthaginians, who suffered many casualties. Hannibal's camp was overrun and they lost much of their baggage. In addition, Hannibal and a delegation of 30 Carthaginian notables who were visiting the army were captured. They were tortured and then nailed to the crosses previously occupied by Spendius and his colleagues. Hamilcar abandoned the siege and withdrew to the north.

== Aftermath ==
Despite the siege being lifted, few supplies were getting through and Mathos decided that the situation was untenable. He led the army 160 km (100 mi) south to the wealthy port city of Leptis Parva (just south of the modern city of Monastir, Tunisia). The Carthaginian Senate encouraged reconciliation between Hanno and Hamilcar, and they agreed to serve together. The pair marched after them with an army totalling perhaps 25,000 including every Carthaginian citizen of military age. On this occasion Hanno and Hamilcar cooperated well and the rebels were forced into a succession of unsuccessful skirmishes as the Carthaginians attempted to wear them down. Mathos, rather than wait to be besieged, decided to meet the Carthaginians in open battle in mid-to-late 238 BC. Battle was given eight to ten weeks after the two armies first engaged near Leptis Parva, and the rebels were crushed, with few losses to the Carthaginians. In a change of policy, prisoners were taken, which probably helped to ensure that there was no desperate last stand. Captives were sold into slavery. Mathos was also captured, and he was dragged through the streets of Carthage and tortured to death by its citizens.

== Notes, citations and sources ==
=== Sources ===
- Bagnall, Nigel (1999). The Punic Wars: Rome, Carthage and the Struggle for the Mediterranean. London: Pimlico. ISBN 978-0-7126-6608-4.
- Eckstein, Arthur (2017). Mediterranean Anarchy, Interstate War, and the Rise of Rome. Berkeley: University of California Press. ISBN 978-0-520-24618-8.
- Goldsworthy, Adrian (2006). The Fall of Carthage: The Punic Wars 265–146 BC. London: Phoenix. ISBN 978-0-304-36642-2.
- Hoyos, Dexter (2000). "Towards a Chronology of the 'Truceless War', 241–237 B.C.". Rheinisches Museum für Philologie. 143 (3/4): 369–380. JSTOR 41234468.
- Hoyos, Dexter (2007). Truceless War: Carthage's Fight for Survival, 241 to 237 BC. Leiden; Boston: Brill. ISBN 978-90-474-2192-4.
- Hoyos, Dexter (2015) [2011]. "Carthage in Africa and Spain, 241–218". In Hoyos, Dexter (ed.). A Companion to the Punic Wars. Chichester, West Sussex: John Wiley. pp. 204–222. ISBN 978-1-1190-2550-4.
- Miles, Richard (2011). Carthage Must be Destroyed. London: Penguin. ISBN 978-0-141-01809-6.
- Scullard, H. H. (2006) [1989]. "Carthage and Rome". In Walbank, F. W.; Astin, A. E.; Frederiksen, M. W. & Ogilvie, R. M. (eds.). Cambridge Ancient History: Volume 7, Part 2, 2nd Edition. Cambridge: Cambridge University Press. pp. 486–569. ISBN 0-521-23446-8.
- Warmington, Brian (1993) [1960]. Carthage. New York: Barnes & Noble, Inc. ISBN 978-1-56619-210-1.
