= Mathos =

Anti-Carthaginian rebel general active 241–238 BC

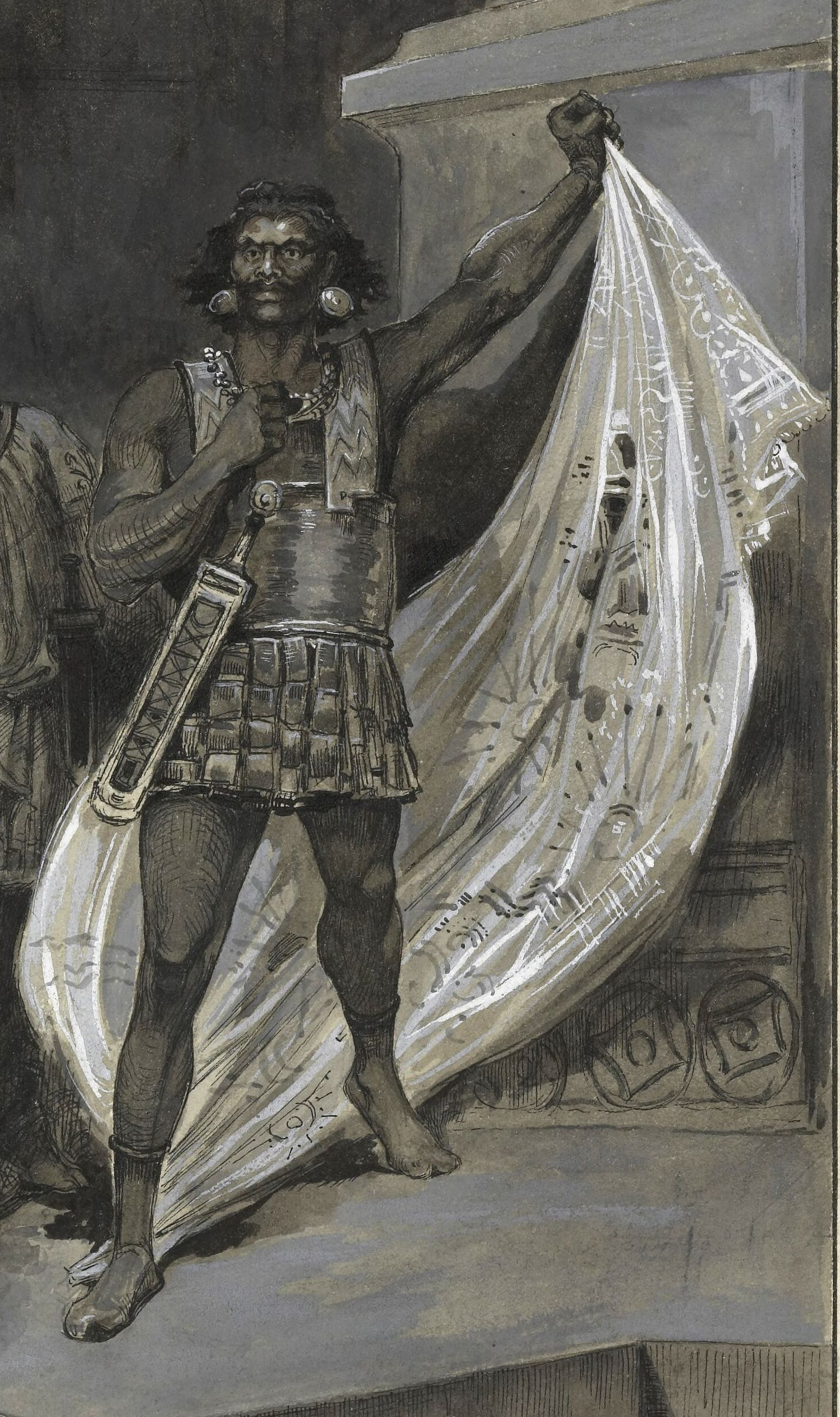
- Mathos, as envisaged by Victor-Armand Poirson in 1890
- Born: Libya
- Died: c. 237 BC; Carthage
- Military career
- Allegiance: Carthaginian Empire (until 241 BC); Anti-Carthaginian rebels (from 241 BC)
- Branch: Carthaginian Army; North African rebel army
- Rank: General
- Conflicts: First Punic War; Mercenary War; Siege of Tunis; Battle of Leptis Parva

Mathos (Punic: 𐤌𐤈𐤀, mṭʾ; Ancient Greek: Μάθως, Máthōs; died c. 237 BC) was a Libyan from the North African possessions of Carthage and was recruited into the Carthaginian Army during the First Punic War (264–241 BC) at some point prior to 241 BC. Mathos's date of birth is unknown, as are most details of his activities prior to his coming to prominence as a low-ranking officer in 241 BC.

After the First Punic War, Carthage attempted to pay its soldiers less than the full amount due to them before demobilising them. Mathos came to the fore as a member of the army most vocal in resisting this decision, and when the disagreement broke down in full-scale mutiny he was elected a general by his comrades and became their de facto leader. Mathos spread the news of the mutiny to the main African settlements under Carthaginian suzerainty and they rose in rebellion. Provisions, money and 70,000 reinforcements poured in. For three years Mathos led the rebels in an increasingly bitter struggle with several changes of fortune. Eventually the remnants of the rebellion were brought to battle near Leptis Parva and defeated. Mathos was captured and taken to Carthage, where he was dragged through the streets and tortured to death by its citizens.

== Background ==
Mathos was a Libyan from the North African possessions of Carthage and was recruited into the Carthaginian Army during the First Punic War (264–241 BC) at some point prior to 241 BC. Mathos's date of birth is unknown, as are most details of his activities prior to his coming to prominence as a low-ranking officer in 241 BC.

== End of the First Punic War and mutiny ==
In 241 BC the First Punic War between Carthage and Rome ended after 23 years. The Romans had defeated a Carthaginian fleet attempting to lift the blockade of its last strongholds on Sicily. With their relief effort repulsed, the Carthaginian Senate accepted defeat and ordered their commander on Sicily, Hamilcar Barca to negotiate a peace treaty with the Romans, on whatever terms he could obtain. Instead, Hamilcar left Sicily in a rage, convinced that the surrender was unnecessary. The negotiation of the treaty, and the subsequent evacuation of the Carthaginian army of 20,000 men from Sicily, was left in the hands of Gisco. Not wishing the freshly idle soldiers to combine for purposes of their own, Gisco split the army into small detachments based on their regions of origin. He sent these back to Carthage one at a time. He anticipated they would be promptly paid the several years' back pay they were owed and hurried on their way home.

The Carthaginian authorities decided to instead wait until all of the troops had arrived and then attempt to negotiate a settlement at a lower rate. Meanwhile, as each group arrived it was billeted inside the city of Carthage where the advantages of civilisation were appreciated to the full after up to eight years under siege. This "tumultuous licentiousness" so alarmed the city's authorities that before the full 20,000 had arrived they were relocated to Sicca Veneria (modern El Kef), 180 km (110 mi) away, even though a significant portion of their arrears had to be paid before they would go. Freed of their long period of military discipline and with nothing to do, the men grumbled among themselves and refused all attempts by the Carthaginians to pay them less than the full amount due. It was at this point that Mathos came to prominence as one of the most outspoken of the 20,000 strong army; he was totally opposed to anything less than full payment, including the fulfilment of all verbal promises.

The leading Carthaginian negotiator was their premier general, Hanno. Over the previous ten years he had led a series of campaigns which greatly increased the area of Africa controlled by Carthage. Hanno was rigorous in squeezing taxes out of the newly conquered territory in order to pay for both the war with Rome and his own campaigns. Half of all agricultural output was taken as war tax, and the tribute previously due from towns and cities had been doubled. These exactions were harshly enforced, causing extreme hardship in many areas. Mathos, as a non-Carthaginian North African, was deeply dissatisfied with Hanno's attitude towards tax raising from Carthage's African possessions. He may also have believed that once the army was paid off and he returned home there would have been no obstacle to Carthage continuing, or even increasing, its exactions. In any event, he became the leader of the faction against settling with Carthage. A large part of the army (possibly the majority) were, like Mathos, from Carthage's North African possessions and were, to a greater or lesser degree, similarly dissatisfied with Carthage's treatment of its African subjects.

In mid- or late September 241 BC, frustrated by the Carthaginian negotiators' attempts to haggle, all 20,000 troops marched to Tunis, 16 km (10 mi) from Carthage. Panicking, the Senate agreed to payment in full. The mutinous troops responded by demanding even more. Gisco, who had a good reputation with the army, was brought over from Sicily in late 241 BC and despatched to the camp with enough money to pay most of what was owed. He started to disburse this, with promises that the balance would be paid as soon as it could be raised. The discontent seemed to have abated until Mathos stirred up the North African contingent with a vision of the Carthaginians wreaking vengeance on them once their comrades had been sent home and their discipline broke down. A riot broke out, dissenters were stoned to death. Spendius, an escaped Roman slave from Campania who faced death by torture if he were returned home, had also been strongly against a settlement; so he and Mathos were jointly declared generals by the mutineers. After further, fruitless, negotiations Gisco and his staff were taken prisoner and his treasury was seized.

Mathos sent messengers to the main African settlements under Carthaginian suzerainty with the news that a formed, experienced, anti-Carthaginian army now existed in the heart of its territory and many cities and towns rose in rebellion. Provisions, money and 70,000 reinforcements poured in. Almost all of Carthaginian Africa joined the mutineers. The pay dispute had become a full-scale revolt threatening Carthage's existence as a state.

=== Battle of Utica ===
Main manoeuvres during the Mercenary War

Mathos ordered the rebels north and blockaded the two main cities – other than Carthage – that had not already come over: the major ports of Utica and Hippo (modern Bizerte). Mathos took charge of the siege of Hippo, Spendius of Utica and the blockade of Carthage from Tunis was under a third general, Autaritus, a Gaul. In early 240 BC Hanno, whose whereabouts during the mutiny are unknown, set off with the army to relieve Utica; he took with him 100 elephants and a siege train. (Note: The military historian Nigel Bagnall queries the utility of the siege train, as the rebels held no towns which could be besieged.)

Hanno stormed Spendius's camp in the Battle of Utica with his 8,000–10,000 men and the elephants, and routed the 10,000 besiegers. Hanno's army took over the camp and Hanno himself entered the city in triumph. However, the battle-hardened veterans of Spendius's army regathered in the nearby hills and, not being pursued, returned towards Utica. The Carthaginians, accustomed to fighting the militias of the Numidian cities, were still celebrating their victory when the rebels counter-attacked. The Carthaginians fled, with great loss of life, losing their baggage and siege trains.

For the rest of the year Hanno skirmished with the rebel force, repeatedly missing opportunities to bring it to battle or to place it at a disadvantage; the military historian Nigel Bagnall writes of Hanno's "incompetence as a field commander". The modern historian Dexter Hoyos assesses Mathos as a passable strategist but an inept field commander and notes that he put Spendius in charge of all major mobile operations until his death. Hoyos speculates that Mathos took charge of logistics and attempted to both maximise and coordinate the war effort of the rebellious African towns.

== Further campaigning, 240–238 BC ==
At some point during 240 BC the Carthaginians raised another army, of approximately 10,000. It included deserters from the rebels, 2,000 cavalry, and 70 elephants, and was placed under the command of Hamilcar. The rebels held the line of the Bagradas River with 10,000 men commanded by Spendius. The Carthaginians forced a crossing by a stratagem and Mathos drew 15,000 men from the forces laying siege to Utica and Hippo and sent them as reinforcements. The rebel army of 25,000 moved to attack the Carthaginians in the Battle of the Bagradas River; Hamilcar feigned a retreat; the rebels broke ranks to pursue; the Carthaginians turned in good order and counter-attacked, routing the rebels; who suffered losses of 8,000 men.

Hamilcar was appointed joint commander of the Carthaginian army, alongside Hanno, but they did not cooperate with each other. While Hanno manoeuvred against Mathos to the north near Hippo, Hamilcar brought various towns and cities which had gone over to the rebels back to Carthaginian allegiance, employing varying mixtures of diplomacy and force. He was shadowed by a larger rebel force under Spendius, which kept to rough ground for fear of the Carthaginians' cavalry and elephants and harried his foragers and scouts. Southwest of Utica, the Carthaginians moved into the mountains in an attempt to bring the rebels to battle, but were surrounded. They were only saved from destruction when an African leader, Naravas, who had served with and admired Hamilcar in Sicily, switched sides with his 2,000 cavalry. This proved disastrous for the rebels, and in the resulting battle they lost 10,000 killed and 4,000 captured.

After leaving Carthage, Hamilcar had treated rebels he had captured well and offered them a choice of joining his army or free passage home. He made the same offer to the 4,000 captives from the recent battle. Mathos and Spendius perceived this generous treatment as the motivation behind Naravas's defection and feared the disintegration of their army; they were aware that such generous terms would not be extended to them personally. To remove the possibility of any goodwill between the sides, they had 700 Carthaginian prisoners, including Gisco, tortured to death: they had their hands cut off, were castrated, their legs broken and were thrown into a pit and buried alive. The Carthaginians, in turn, killed their prisoners. From this point, neither side showed any mercy, and the unusual ferocity of the fighting caused Polybius to term it the "Truceless War". Any further prisoners taken by the Carthaginians were trampled to death by elephants.

At some point between March and September 239 BC the previously loyal cities of Utica and Hippo killed their Carthaginian garrisons and joined the rebels. The people of Utica offered their city to the Romans, who, consistent with their treaty obligations, declined. Mathos and the rebels previously operating in the area moved south and changed their base to Tunis. From there, Mathos continued to exercise overall direction. Among other tasks, he organised the minting of silver coins from the bullion donated by the disaffected cities, most of them bearing his initial. Having a clear superiority in cavalry, Hamilcar raided the supply lines of the rebels around Carthage. In early 238 BC, the lack of supplies forced Mathos to lift the close siege of Carthage; he maintained a more distant blockade from Tunis.

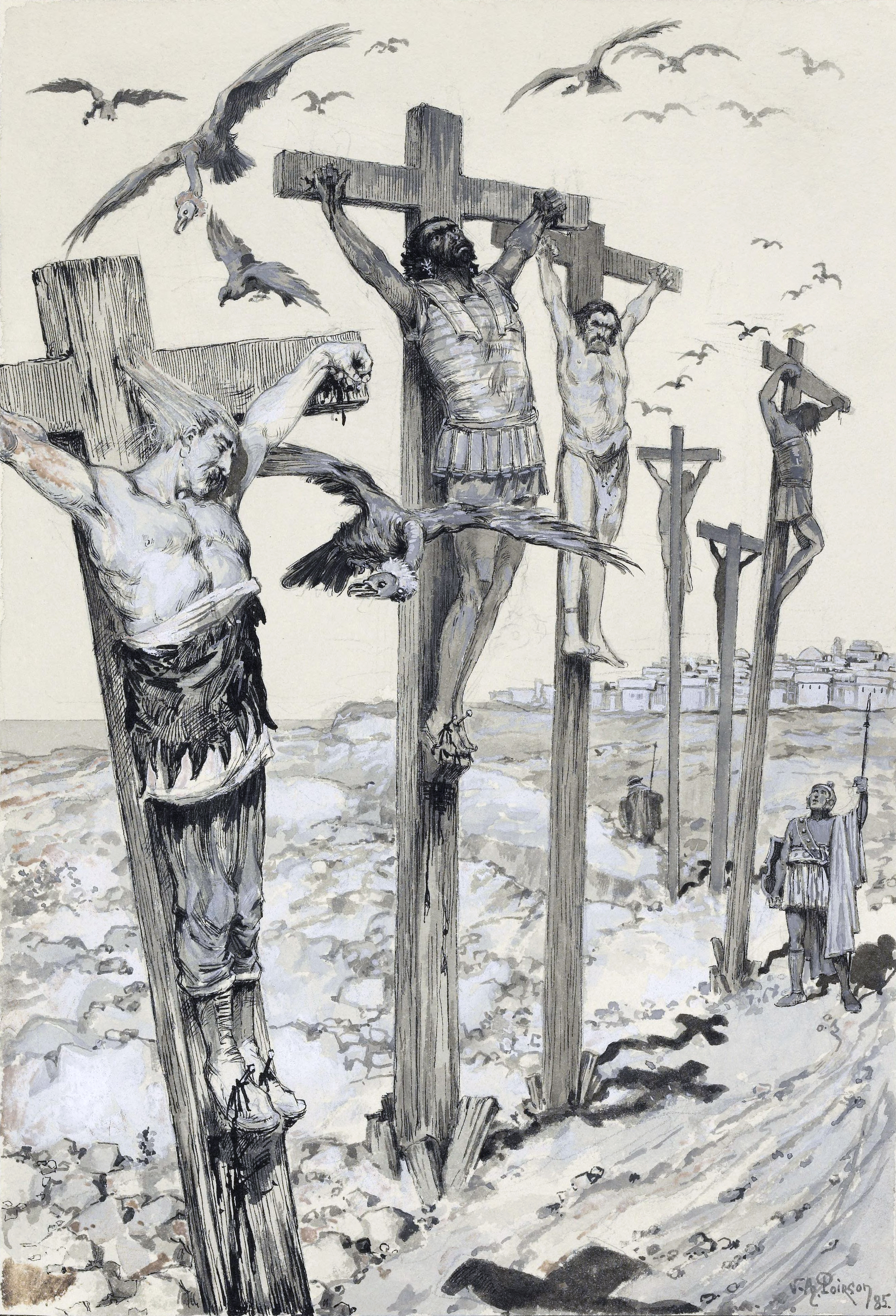
An illustration by Victor-Armand Poirson which envisages the crucifixion of rebel leaders in front of Tunis.

While Mathos maintained the blockade, Spendius led 40,000 men against Hamilcar. As in the previous year, they stayed to the higher and rougher terrain and harassed the Carthaginian army. After a period of campaigning, the details of which are not clear in the sources, the Carthaginians trapped the rebels in a pass or mountain range known as the Saw. Pinned against mountains and with their food exhausted, the rebels ate their horses, their prisoners and then their slaves, hoping that Mathos would sortie from Tunis to rescue them. Eventually, the surrounded troops forced their leaders, including Spendius and Autaritus, to parley with Hamilcar, but on a thin pretext he took the mutineers prisoner. The rebels then attempted to fight their way out in the Battle of the Saw and were massacred to a man.

Hamilcar marched on Tunis and laid siege to it in 238 BC. The city was difficult to access from both the east and west, so Hamilcar occupied a position to the south with half the army, and his deputy Hannibal (Note: Not to be confused with Hannibal of Second Punic War fame, the son of Hamilcar Barca.) was to the north with the balance. The rebel leaders taken captive prior to the Saw were crucified in full view of the city. Mathos ordered a large-scale night attack, which surprised the Carthaginians, who suffered many casualties. Their northern camp was overrun and they lost much of their baggage. In addition, Hannibal and a delegation of 30 Carthaginian notables who were visiting the army were captured. They were tortured and then nailed to the crosses previously occupied by Spendius and his colleagues. The Carthaginians abandoned the siege and withdrew to the north. Despite the siege being lifted, few supplies were getting through, and Mathos decided that the situation was untenable. He led the army 160 km (100 mi) south to the wealthy port city of Leptis Parva (just south of the modern city of Monastir, Tunisia). This was the capital of the prosperous Byzacium region and had risen against Carthage earlier in the war. The historian Dexter Hoyos speculates that the rebels may have been hoping to leave the area by sea.

=== Battle of Leptis Parva ===
The Carthaginian Senate encouraged reconciliation between Hanno and Hamilcar, and they agreed to serve together. The pair marched after them with an army totalling perhaps 25,000, including every Carthaginian citizen of military age. On this occasion, Hanno and Hamilcar cooperated well together and harassed the rebels on their march. The rebels were forced into a succession of unsuccessful skirmishes around Byzacium as the Carthaginians attempted to wear them down. Mathos, rather than wait to be besieged, decided to meet the Carthaginians in open battle in mid- to late-238 BC. As the rebels were by now in extremis, Mathos called in every available man, stripping all rebel-held towns of garrisons. As the rebels situation worsened, they had increasingly suffered from desertions. Few of the original mutineers survived to participate in this battle; most of the rebel army was made up of indigenous North Africans. The Carthaginian army, on the other hand, was steadily reinforced and had grown to over 30,000; it would have included a large number of war elephants. (Note: North Africa had indigenous African forest elephants at the time. These were typically about 2.5-metre-high (8 ft) at the shoulder, and should not be confused with the larger African bush elephant. The sources are not clear as to whether they carried towers containing fighting men.)

Battle was given eight to ten weeks after the two armies arrived in Byzacium, although the location is not known. Few details of the battle survive. It was a set piece battle, with no subtleties of manoeuvre – Mathos was not a proficient general and the Carthaginians were so superior that they felt no need for stratagems. Hamilcar was the senior Carthaginian commander, and he ensured that the rebels were crushed, with few losses to the Carthaginians. In a change of policy, prisoners were taken, which probably helped to ensure that there was no desperate last stand. Captives were sold into slavery. Mathos was also captured, and he was dragged through the streets of Carthage and tortured to death by its citizens.

== Aftermath ==
Most of the towns and cities which had not already come to terms with Carthage now did so, with the exceptions of Utica and Hippo, whose inhabitants feared vengeance for their massacre of Carthaginians. They attempted to hold out, but Polybius says that they too "quickly" surrendered, probably in late 238 BC or very early 237 BC. The surrendered towns and cities were treated leniently, although Carthaginian governors were imposed on them.

Mathos is featured as a main character in Gustave Flaubert's 1862 historical novel Salammbô.

== Notes, citations and sources ==
=== Sources ===
- Bagnall, Nigel (1999). The Punic Wars: Rome, Carthage and the Struggle for the Mediterranean. London: Pimlico. ISBN 978-0-7126-6608-4.
- Eckstein, Arthur (2017). "The First Punic War and After, 264-237 BC". The Encyclopedia of Ancient Battles. Wiley Online Library. pp. 1–14. doi:10.1002/9781119099000.wbabat0270. ISBN 9781405186452.
- Goldsworthy, Adrian (2006). The Fall of Carthage: The Punic Wars 265–146 BC. London: Phoenix. ISBN 978-0-304-36642-2.
- Hoyos, Dexter (2000). "Towards a Chronology of the 'Truceless War', 241–237 B.C.". Rheinisches Museum für Philologie. 143 (3/4): 369–380. JSTOR 41234468.
- Hoyos, Dexter (2007). Truceless War: Carthage's Fight for Survival, 241 to 237 BC. Leiden; Boston: Brill. ISBN 978-90-474-2192-4.
- Hoyos, Dexter (2015) [2011]. "Carthage in Africa and Spain, 241–218". In Hoyos, Dexter (ed.). A Companion to the Punic Wars. Chichester, West Sussex: John Wiley. pp. 204–222. ISBN 978-1-1190-2550-4.
- Huss, Werner (1985). Geschichte der Karthager (in German). Munich: C.H. Beck. ISBN 9783406306549.
- Lazenby, John (1996). The First Punic War: A Military History. Stanford, California: Stanford University Press. ISBN 978-0-8047-2673-3.
- Miles, Richard (2011). Carthage Must be Destroyed. London: Penguin. ISBN 978-0-141-01809-6.
- Sabin, Philip (1996). "The Mechanics of Battle in the Second Punic War". Bulletin of the Institute of Classical Studies. Supplement. 67 (67): 59–79. JSTOR 43767903.
- Scullard, H.H. (2006). "Carthage and Rome". In Walbank, F. W.; Astin, A. E.; Frederiksen, M. W.; Ogilvie, R. M. (eds.). Cambridge Ancient History: Volume 7, Part 2, 2nd Edition. Cambridge. pp. 486–569.
- Starr, Peter (1985). "Salammbo: the Politics of an Ending". French Forum. 10 (1): 40–56. JSTOR 40551118.
- Warmington, Brian (1993) [1960]. Carthage. New York: Barnes & Noble, Inc. ISBN 978-1-56619-210-1.
