= Battle of the Bagradas River (240 BC) =

Carthaginian military victory in 240 BC

- Part of Carthage's Mercenary War
- Medjerda river drainage basin
Date	240 BC
Location	Medjerda River 37°07′N 10°08′E
Result	Carthaginian victory

Belligerents
Carthage	Rebels

Commanders and leaders
Hamilcar Barca	Spendius

Strength
8,000 infantry 2,000 cavalry 70 elephants	20,000−25,000 men

Casualties and losses
Unknown	6,000 killed 2,000 captured
- Location within Tunisia Battle of the Bagradas River (240 BC) (Mediterranean)

The Battle of the Bagradas River was fought between a Carthaginian army led by Hamilcar Barca, who was victorious, and a rebel force led by Spendius. The battle in 240 BC was fought in what is now northeast Tunisia. Carthage was fighting a coalition of mutinous soldiers and rebellious African cities in the Mercenary War, which had started late the previous year in the wake of the First Punic War. The rebels were blockading Carthage and besieging the northern ports of Utica and Hippo (modern Bizerte). A Carthaginian army commanded by Hanno had attempted and failed to relieve Utica earlier that year. A second army was assembled in Carthage and entrusted to Hamilcar, who had commanded Carthaginian forces on Sicily for the last six years of the First Punic War.

The new Carthaginian army left Carthage and evaded the rebel blockade by crossing the Bagradas River (present-day Medjerda River) at its mouth. Rebel armies commanded by Spendius, from both the Utica siege and a camp guarding the only bridge over the lower Bagradas River, marched towards the Carthaginians. When they came into their sight, Hamilcar ordered his men to feign a retreat. The rebels broke ranks to chase after the Carthaginians and this impetuous pursuit caused them to fall into confusion. Once the rebels had drawn close, the Carthaginians turned and counter-charged them. The rebels broke and were routed. The Carthaginians pursued, killing or capturing many of the rebels and taking the fortifications guarding the bridge.

This victory gave Hamilcar freedom to manoeuvre and the operational initiative. He confronted towns and cities that had previously gone over to the rebels, bringing them back to Carthaginian allegiance. Spendius regrouped his remaining forces to confront Hamilcar again in the mountains of north west Tunisia and Hamilcar was again victorious. Spendius, in an attempt to prevent desertion, had his Carthaginian prisoners tortured to death. Hamilcar in turn had existing and future prisoners trampled to death by elephants. After two further years of increasingly bitter warfare the rebels were worn down and eventually defeated at the Battle of Leptis Parva.

== Background ==
The First Punic War was fought between Carthage and Rome, the two main powers of the western Mediterranean in the 3rd century BC, and lasted for 23 years, from 264 to 241 BC. The two powers struggled for supremacy primarily on the Mediterranean island of Sicily and its surrounding waters, and also in North Africa. While the war with Rome was being fought on Sicily, the Carthaginian general Hanno led a series of campaigns that greatly increased the area of Africa controlled by Carthage. He extended its control to Theveste (modern Tébessa, Algeria) 300 kilometres (190 mi) south-west of their capital and was rigorous in squeezing taxes out of the newly conquered territory to pay for both the war with Rome and his own campaigns. Half of all agricultural output was taken as war tax, and the tribute due from all towns and cities was doubled. These exactions were harshly enforced, causing extreme hardship in many areas.

After immense material and human losses on both sides during the First Punic War, the Carthaginians were defeated. The Carthaginian Senate ordered the commander of its forces on Sicily, Hamilcar Barca, to negotiate a peace treaty on whatever terms he could. Convinced that the surrender was unnecessary Hamilcar left Sicily in a rage and delegated negotiations to his deputy Gisco. The Treaty of Lutatius was agreed and brought the First Punic War to an end.

=== Mutiny ===
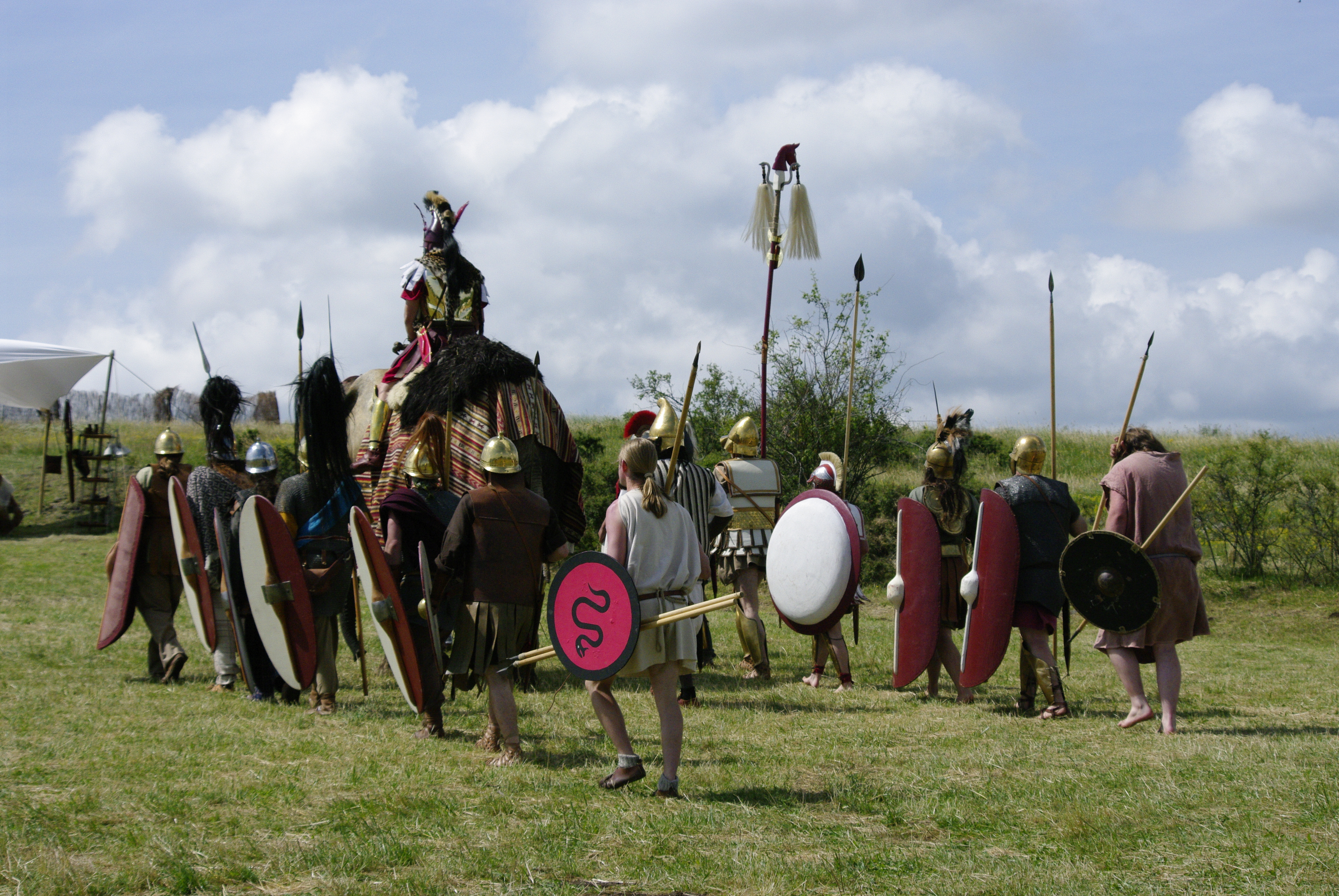
Modern recreations of Carthaginian soldiers and a war elephant at the 2012 Arverniales re-enactment

The post-war evacuation of the Carthaginian army of 20,000 men from Sicily was left in the hands of Gisco. He split the army into small detachments based on their regions of origin and sent these back to Carthage one at a time. He anticipated they would be promptly paid the several years back pay they were owed and hurried on their way home. The Carthaginian authorities decided instead to wait until all of the troops had arrived and then attempt to negotiate a settlement at a lower rate. They despatched the returning troops to Sicca Veneria (modern El Kef), 180 km (110 mi) away.

Freed of their long period of military discipline and with nothing to do, the men grumbled among themselves and refused all attempts by the Carthaginians to pay them less than the full amount due. Frustrated by the Carthaginian negotiators' attempts to haggle, all 20,000 troops marched to Tunis, 16 km (10 mi) from Carthage. Panicking, the Senate agreed to payment in full. The mutinous troops responded by demanding even more. Gisco, who had a good reputation with the army, was brought over from Sicily in late 241 BC and despatched to the camp with enough money to pay most of what was owed. He started to disburse this, with promises that the balance would be paid as soon as it could be raised, when discipline broke down. Several soldiers insisted that no deal with Carthage was acceptable, a riot broke out, men who stayed loyal to Carthage were stoned to death, Gisco and his staff were taken prisoner, and his treasury was seized.

The rebels declared Spendius, an escaped Roman slave who faced death by torture if recaptured, and Mathos, a Berber dissatisfied with Hanno's attitude towards tax-raising from Carthage's African possessions, their generals. The news of a formed, experienced, anti-Carthaginian army in the heart of its territory spread rapidly and many cities and towns rose in rebellion. Provisions, money and reinforcements poured in. Eventually another 70,000 men were recruited according to the ancient historian Polybius, although many would have been tied down in garrisoning their home towns against Carthaginian retribution. The pay dispute had become a full-scale revolt. The three years of war that followed are known as the Mercenary War and threatened Carthage's existence as a state.

=== Hanno's campaign ===
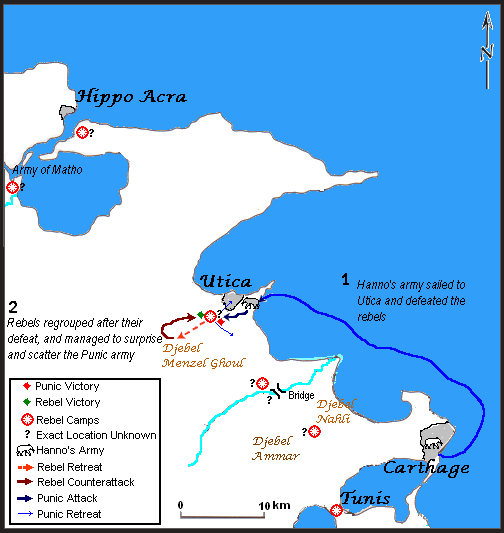
The Battle of Utica

Hanno, as the commander of Carthage's African army, took the field. Most of the Africans in his force remained loyal; they were accustomed to acting against their fellow Africans. His non-African contingent had remained quartered in Carthage when the army of Sicily was expelled, and also remained loyal. The few troops still in Sicily were paid up to date and redeployed with Hanno, and money was raised to hire fresh troops. An unknown number of Carthaginian citizens were incorporated into his army. By the time this force was assembled, the rebels had already blockaded Utica and Hippo (modern Bizerte).

In early 240 BC Hanno set off with the army to relieve Utica; he took with him 100 war elephants and a siege train. (Note: The military historian Nigel Bagnall queries the utility of the siege train, as the rebels held no towns which could be besieged.) The Carthaginians stormed the rebels' camp in the Battle of Utica and their elephants routed the besiegers. Their army took over the camp and Hanno entered the city in triumph. However, the battle-hardened veterans of the Sicilian army regathered in the nearby hills and, not being pursued, returned towards Utica. The Carthaginians, accustomed to fighting the militias of the Numidian cities, were still celebrating their victory when the rebels counter-attacked. The Carthaginians fled, with great loss of life, losing their baggage and siege trains. For the rest of the year Hanno skirmished with the rebel force, repeatedly missing opportunities to bring it to battle or to place it at a disadvantage; the military historian Nigel Bagnall writes of Hanno's "incompetence as a field commander". The rebels reinforced their siege of Utica to 15,000 men, where Spendius took command and continued to restrict landward access to Carthage from their stronghold at Tunis. They also established a force of 10,000 men in a fortified camp at the only bridge over the lower Bagradas River (the modern Medjerda River).

== Battle ==
=== Prelude ===
At some point during 240 BC the Carthaginians raised another army, of approximately 10,000. It included deserters from the rebels, newly hired mercenaries, citizen militia, 2,000 cavalry, and 70 elephants. This was placed under the command of Hamilcar, who had commanded the Carthaginian forces on Sicily for the last six years of the First Punic War. This was dangerously small for a sortie against the stronger rebel forces, especially so for a direct assault. The Carthaginians needed to gain the far side of the Bagradas, so they could manoeuvre freely, but lacked the strength to force a crossing against the superior rebel force guarding against this.

There was an underwater sandbar across the mouth of the Bagradas. (Note: The current mouth of the river is several kilometres north of its location in 240 BC.) This was too deeply submerged to be fordable under normal conditions, but Hamilcar was aware that when the wind blew strongly from the east it held back the flow of the Bagradas sufficiently for the sandbar to be crossable. Apparently the rebels were ignorant of this. With a strong easterly wind blowing, Hamilcar marched his army out of Carthage at night in great secrecy along the north shore of the isthmus towards the mouth of the Bagradas River. His movement was not detected by the rebels and at dawn he crossed the Bagradas River along the sandbar – the army had marched 16 km from Carthage and was now free to manoeuvre in the African countryside.

=== Opposing armies ===
Carthaginian armies were nearly always composed of foreigners; citizens only served in the army if there was a direct threat to the city of Carthage. Roman sources refer to these foreign fighters derogatively as "mercenaries", but the modern classicist Adrian Goldsworthy describes this as "a gross oversimplification". They served under a variety of arrangements; for example, some were the regular troops of allied cities or kingdoms seconded to Carthage as part of formal arrangements. The majority of these foreigners were from North Africa.

Libyans provided close-order infantry equipped with large shields, helmets, short swords and long thrusting spears; as well as close-order shock cavalry carrying spears (Note: "Shock" troops are those trained and used to close rapidly with an opponent, with the intention of breaking them before or immediately upon contact.) (also known as "heavy cavalry") – both were noted for their discipline and staying power. Numidians provided light cavalry who threw javelins from a distance and avoided close combat, and javelin-armed light infantry skirmishers. Both Spain and Gaul provided experienced infantry; unarmoured troops who would charge ferociously, but had a reputation for breaking off if a combat was protracted. Specialist slingers were recruited from the Balearic Islands. The close order Libyan infantry and the citizen militia would fight in a tightly packed formation known as a phalanx. Sicilians and Italians had also joined up during the war to fill the ranks. The Carthaginians frequently employed war elephants; North Africa had indigenous African forest elephants at the time. (Note: These elephants were typically about 2.5 metres (8 ft) high at the shoulder, and should not be confused with the larger African bush elephant.) The sources are not clear as to whether they carried towers containing fighting men.

The rebel armies would have been of similar composition and equipment to those of Carthage, including many experienced veterans of the army of Sicily, a large proportion more recent recruits. Most of this force was infantry; their cavalry component was smaller and of poorer quality than that of the Carthaginians and lacked elephants entirely.

=== Engagement ===
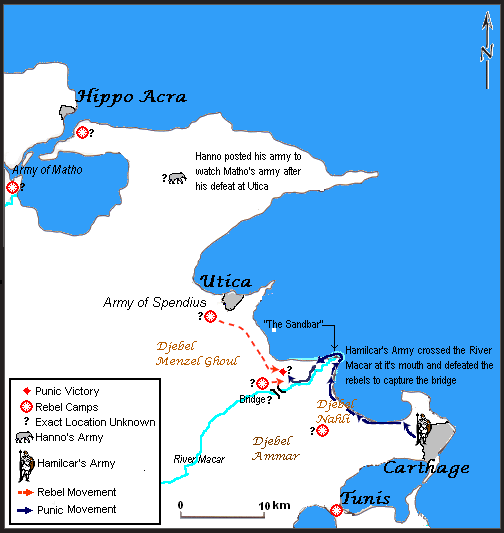
The major movements of both sides during the battle

While the Carthaginians were organising their forces, and probably eating and resting after their march, the rebels at the bridge – 8 km (5 mi) from the river mouth – and Utica – 15 km (9 mi) from the river mouth – rushed to confront them. Spendius sent the bulk of the rebels at Utica east, and pulled out nearly all of the men guarding the bridge. This gave him a total of over 20,000 rebels, possibly as many as 25,000, marching towards the 10,000 Carthaginians. Hamilcar advanced his army along the bank of the Bagradas towards the bridge, possibly hoping to attack the rebels at the bridge and defeat them in detail before they could be reinforced from Utica. The Carthaginians faced rebel forces converging on them from the west and north, each of approximately the same strength as the entire Carthaginian army. The Carthaginian column had their 70 elephants at the front, followed by heavy cavalry and light infantry, and the heavy infantry at the rear in several parallel columns; there were gaps between these components. There is no mention in the sources of cavalry scouts or outriders.

Much of the Carthaginian army was newly recruited, but Hamilcar had been able to train it in some drill and basic battlefield manoeuvres before they left Carthage. As the two rebel forces came into clear sight the Carthaginians wheeled, and marched away. The Carthaginians were marching in good order and carrying out a pre-planned manoeuvre which they had practised in Carthage. The rebels, many of whom were inexperienced soldiers, believed that the Carthaginians were running away. Shouting encouragement to each other they broke into a run to pursue. Spendius is believed to have been attempting to trap the outnumbered Carthaginians against the river with his two forces, pinning them with one and out-flanking them with the other. When his troops rushed towards the retreating Carthaginians, Spendius was either unable to control them, or also believed that the Carthaginians were fleeing and encouraged his forces' pursuit.

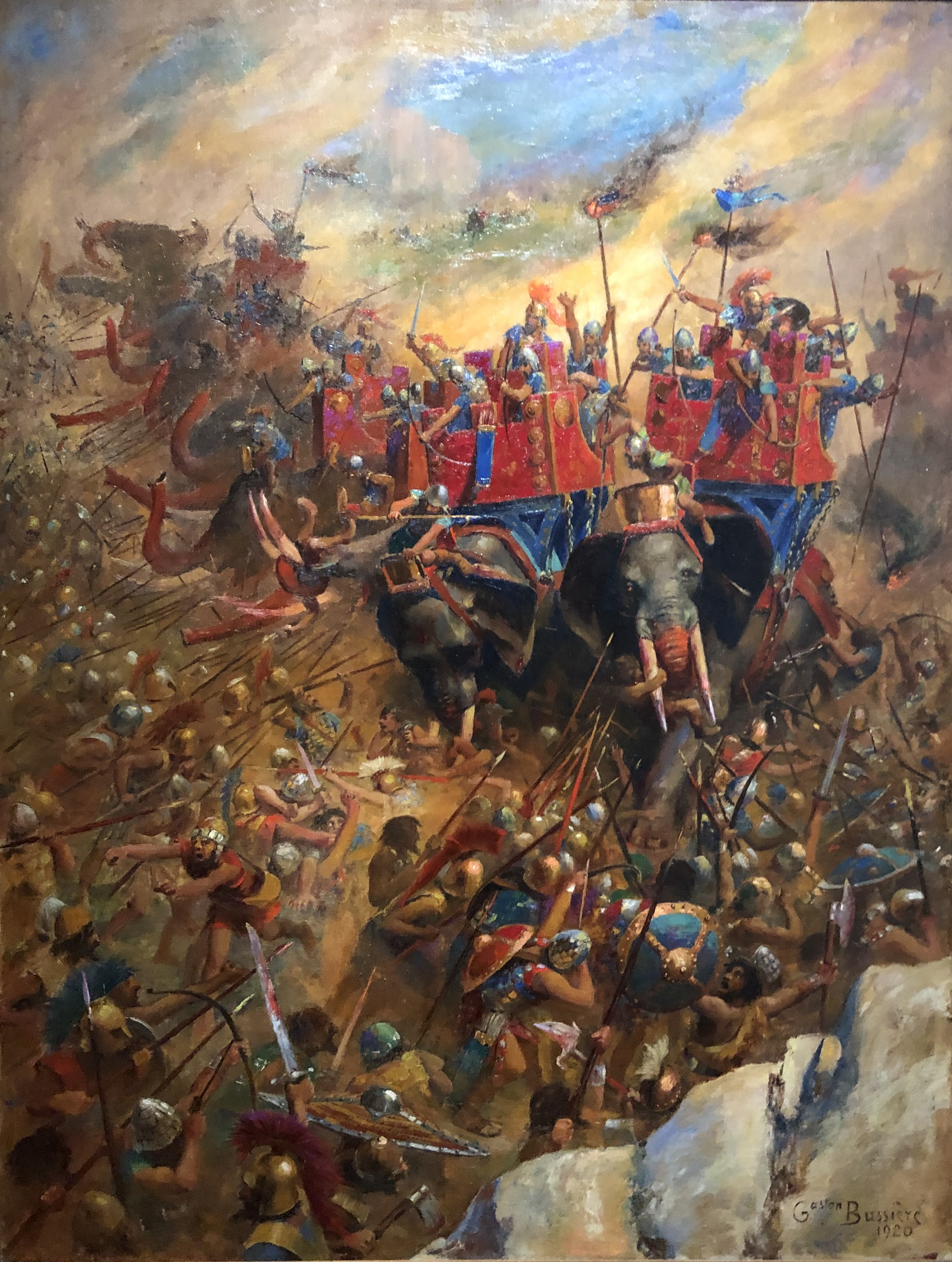
Charge of the Carthaginian war elephants at the Bagradas River, as envisaged by Gaston Bussière in 1920. Whether the elephants actually carried towers with fighting men is unclear.

With the rebels some 500 metres (2,000 ft) away, Hamilcar ordered the heavy infantry to wheel about again and take up a battle formation. As the cavalry and then the elephants came closer to the infantry Hamilcar ordered each in turn to also wheel about to face the rebels. The modern historian Dexter Hoyos stresses that "[s]uch manoeuvres were about the simplest that any army could learn, once it mastered the absolute basics of marching in formation". The leading rebel formation suddenly found itself not pursuing a shaken foe, but faced at close range by formed bodies of elephants and cavalry with more than 7,000 heavy infantry advancing behind them. By this point the rebels had completely lost formation, and even unit cohesion. The rebels in their leading units panicked and routed. At least part of this body was obstructed by the other rebel formation which was still charging towards the Carthaginians and they even came to blows as the men of the second group attempted to prevent those of the first from fleeing. Into this confusion charged the Carthaginian elephants and cavalry; in the words of the ancient historian Polybius "many were trampled when the cavalry and elephants attacked them at close quarters."

Hoyos speculates that the Carthaginian elephants and cavalry cut off large numbers of the routing rebels and trapped them against the Bagradas River, where the Carthaginian heavy infantry, marching up in good order, easily killed or captured them. The Carthaginian light infantry would have spread out across the battlefield, picking off the wounded and stragglers. The surviving rebels fled, and Hamilcar marched his infantry on the fortified camp guarding the bridge over the Bagradas. The rebels there barely paused in their flight before continuing to Tunis, taking the small garrison which had been left out of battle with them. Spendius was probably with this force, still unable to exert any control. Rebel losses were 6,000 killed and 2,000 captured. As a result of the battle Hamilcar had gained the operational initiative and the freedom to manoeuvre he desired.

== Aftermath ==
While Hanno manoeuvred against Mathos to the north near Hippo, Hamilcar confronted several towns and cities that had gone over to the rebels, bringing them back to Carthaginian allegiance with varying mixtures of diplomacy and force. He was shadowed by a superior-sized rebel force, which kept to rough ground for fear of Hamilcar's cavalry and elephants, and harried his foragers and scouts. South west of Utica Hamilcar moved his force into the mountains in an attempt to bring the rebels to battle, but was surrounded. The Carthaginians were only saved from destruction when a Numidian leader, Naravas, who had served with and admired Hamilcar in Sicily, swapped sides with his 2,000 cavalry. This proved disastrous for the rebels; in the resulting battle 10,000 were killed and 4,000 captured.

Embittered by this betrayal, Spendius had his Carthaginian prisoners tortured, mutilated and killed. Hamilcar in turn had existing and future prisoners trampled to death by elephants. The Carthaginians fought a fierce and bitter campaign against the rebels, before wearing them down and finally defeating them at the Battle of Leptis Parva in 238 BC.

== Notes, citations and sources ==
=== Sources ===
- Bagnall, Nigel (1999). The Punic Wars: Rome, Carthage and the Struggle for the Mediterranean. London: Pimlico. ISBN 978-0-7126-6608-4.
- Eckstein, Arthur (2017). "The First Punic War and After, 264–237 BC". The Encyclopedia of Ancient Battles. Vol. IV, The Macedonian Age and the Rise of Rome. Chichester, West Sussex: John Wiley & Sons. pp. 1–14. doi:10.1002/9781119099000.wbabat0270. ISBN 978-1-4051-8645-2.
- Goldsworthy, Adrian (2006). The Fall of Carthage: The Punic Wars 265–146 BC. London: Phoenix. ISBN 978-0-304-36642-2.
- Hoyos, Dexter (2000). "Towards a Chronology of the 'Truceless War', 241–237 B.C.". Rheinisches Museum für Philologie. 143 (3/4): 369–380. JSTOR 41234468.
- Hoyos, Dexter (2007). Truceless War: Carthage's Fight for Survival, 241 to 237 BC. Leiden, Netherlands; Boston, Massachusetts: Brill. ISBN 978-90-474-2192-4.
- Hoyos, Dexter (2015) [2011]. "Carthage in Africa and Spain, 241–218". In Hoyos, Dexter (ed.). A Companion to the Punic Wars. Chichester, West Sussex: John Wiley & Sons. pp. 204–222. ISBN 978-1-1190-2550-4.
- Koon, Sam (2015) [2011]. "Phalanx and Legion: the "Face" of Punic War Battle". In Hoyos, Dexter (ed.). A Companion to the Punic Wars. Chichester, West Sussex: John Wiley & Sons. pp. 77–94. ISBN 978-1-1190-2550-4.
- Jones, Archer (1987). The Art of War in the Western World. Urbana, Illinois: University of Illinois Press. ISBN 978-0-252-01380-5.
- Lazenby, John (1996). The First Punic War: A Military History. Stanford, California: Stanford University Press. ISBN 978-1857281361.
- Miles, Richard (2011). Carthage Must be Destroyed. London: Penguin Books. ISBN 978-0-141-01809-6.
- Scullard, H. H. (1974). The Elephant in the Greek and Roman World. London: Thames and Hudson. ISBN 978-0-500-40025-8.
- Scullard, H. H. (2006) [1989]. "Carthage and Rome". In Walbank, F. W.; Astin, A. E.; Frederiksen, M. W. & Ogilvie, R. M. (eds.). Cambridge Ancient History. Vol. 7, Part 2 (2nd ed.). Cambridge: Cambridge University Press. pp. 486–569. ISBN 978-0-521-23446-7.
- Warmington, Brian (1993) [1960]. Carthage. New York: Barnes & Noble, Inc. ISBN 978-1-56619-210-1.
