= Battle of Leptis Parva =

Battle of 238 BC during the Mercenary War

- Part of the Mercenary War
Date	238 BC
Location	Byzacium, in modern Tunisia
Result	Carthaginian victory

Belligerents
Carthage	Carthage's mutinous army Rebellious African towns

Commanders and leaders
Hanno II the Great; Hamilcar Barca	Mathos (executed)

Strength
30,000	20,000

Casualties and losses
Unknown	High

The Battle of Leptis Parva was fought in 238 BC between a Carthaginian army of over 30,000 commanded by Hamilcar Barca and Hanno, and approximately 20,000 mutinous Carthaginian soldiers and North African rebels under Matho in the North African province of Byzacium (in modern Tunisia). The battle was the final major conflict of the Mercenary War and resulted in a decisive victory for the Carthaginians.

In 241 BC 20,000 foreign troops who had been employed by Carthage during the First Punic War (264 to 241 BC) mutinied under the leadership of Spendius and Mathos starting the Mercenary War. They were supported by an uprising of Carthage's oppressed African territories and 70,000 local recruits flocked to join them, bringing supplies and finance. War-weary Carthage fared poorly in the initial engagements of the war, especially under the leadership of Hanno. Hamilcar Barca was given supreme command in 239 BC and slowly turned the tide.

In 238 BC Mathos and the remnants of the rebel army left the area around Carthage and marched 160 km (100 mi) south to the wealthy port city of Leptis Parva. Hanno reconciled with Hamilcar and with a larger Carthaginian army they pursued the rebels, harrying their march. After three months of manoeuvres, in which the rebels consistently came off worst, battle was given and the rebels were completely defeated. The remaining rebellious cities rapidly surrendered or were captured by the Carthaginians, ending the war.

== Background ==
Main manoeuvres during the war

In 241 BC 20,000 foreign troops who had been employed by Carthage in the fighting on Sicily during the First Punic War (264 to 241 BC) were recalled to the Carthaginian homeland in North Africa (in what is now Tunisia) to be paid and despatched home. A dispute over the payment of wages owed developed and late in the year the troops mutinied under the leadership of Spendius and Mathos starting the Mercenary War. They were supported by an uprising of Carthage's oppressed dependent territories and 70,000 Africans flocked to join them, bringing supplies and finance.

War-weary Carthage fared poorly in the initial engagements of the war, especially under the generalship of Hanno, and was under blockade for most of the war. At some point during 240 BC the Carthaginians raised another, smaller, force, which was placed under the command of Hamilcar Barca, (Note: Hamilcar Barca was the father of Hannibal) who had commanded the Carthaginian forces on Sicily for the last six years of the First Punic War. After a significant victory over a rebel army led by Spendius at the Battle of the Bagradas River Hamilcar was given joint command of the army. Hamilcar and Hanno were political opponents and had different approaches to fighting the war, so there was no military cooperation between them. Hamilcar campaigned successfully, initially demonstrating leniency in an attempt to woo the rebels over. To ensure a great hatred between the armies, and so prevent their men being tempted to desert to the Carthaginians, in 240 BC Spendius tortured 700 Carthaginian prisoners to death, and henceforth the war was pursued with great brutality. Hamilcar was given supreme command in 239 BC.

Meanwhile, the rebels under Mathos had blockaded the Carthaginian-supporting cities of Utica and Hippo (modern Bizerte) and put an army under Spendius into the field. Eventually the rebel field army was destroyed and Spendius captured and crucified. Despite the inhabitants of Utica and Hippo slaughtering their Carthaginian garrisons and going over to the rebels in 239 BC, the following year Mathos and his army left the area around Carthage and marched 160 km (100 mi) south to the wealthy port city of Leptis Parva (just south of the modern city of Monastir, Tunisia). This was the capital of the prosperous Byzacium region and had risen against Carthage earlier in the war. The historian Dexter Hoyos speculates that the rebels may have been hoping to leave the area by sea.

== Battle ==
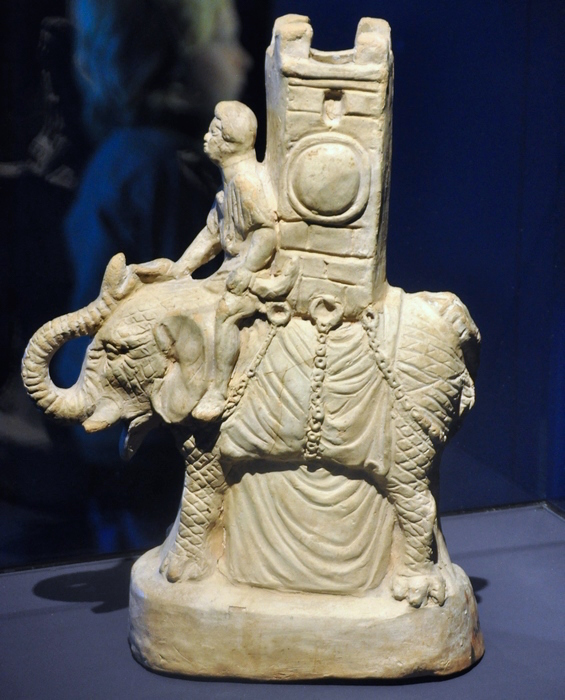
Roman statuette of a war elephant recovered from Herculaneum

The Carthaginian Senate encouraged reconciliation between Hanno and Hamilcar, and they agreed to serve together. The pair marched after the rebels with an army totalling perhaps 25,000 including every Carthaginian citizen of military age. On this occasion Hanno and Hamilcar cooperated well together and harassed the rebels on their march. The rebels were forced into a succession of unsuccessful skirmishes in Byzacium as the Carthaginians attempted to wear them down. Mathos, rather than wait to be besieged, decided to meet the Carthaginians in open battle in mid- to late 238 BC. As the rebels were by now in extremis Mathos called in every available man, stripping all rebel-held towns of garrisons. As the rebels' situation had worsened, they had increasingly suffered from desertions. Few of the original mutineers remained, after the previous three years of fierce campaigning, to participate in this battle; most of the rebel army was made up of indigenous North Africans. The Carthaginian army on the other hand, was steadily reinforced and had grown to over 30,000 men and a large number of war elephants. (Note: North Africa had indigenous African forest elephants at the time. These were typically about 2.5-metre-high (8 ft) at the shoulder, and should not be confused with the larger African bush elephant. The sources are not clear as to whether they carried towers containing fighting men.)

Battle was given eight to ten weeks after the two armies arrived in Byzacium, although the location is not known. Few details of the battle survive. It was a set piece battle, with no subtleties of manoeuvre – Mathos was not a proficient general and the Carthaginians were so superior that they felt no need for stratagems. Hamilcar was the senior Carthaginian commander and he ensured that the rebels were crushed, with few losses to the Carthaginians. In a change of policy, prisoners were taken, which probably helped to ensure that there was no desperate last stand. Captives were sold into slavery. Mathos was also captured, and he was dragged through the streets of Carthage and tortured to death by its inhabitants.

== Aftermath ==
Most of the towns and cities which had not already come to terms with Carthage now did so, with the exceptions of Utica and Hippo, whose inhabitants feared vengeance for their massacre of Carthaginians. They attempted to hold out, but Polybius says that they too "quickly" surrendered, probably in late 238 or very early 237 BC. The towns and cities that surrendered were treated leniently, although Carthaginian governors were imposed on them. Immediately after the war Hamilcar led many of his veterans on an expedition to expand Carthaginian holdings in southern Iberia; this was to become a semi-autonomous Barcid fiefdom. In 218 BC a Carthaginian army under Hannibal Barca besieged the Roman-protected town of Saguntum in eastern Iberia, providing the spark which ignited the Second Punic War.

== Notes, citations and sources ==
=== Sources ===
- Bagnall, Nigel (1999). The Punic Wars: Rome, Carthage and the Struggle for the Mediterranean. London: Pimlico. ISBN 978-0-7126-6608-4.
- Collins, Roger (1998). Spain: An Oxford Archaeological Guide. Oxford: Oxford University Press. ISBN 978-0-19-285300-4.
- Eckstein, Arthur (2017). "The First Punic War and After, 264-237 BC". The Encyclopedia of Ancient Battles. Wiley Online Library. pp. 1–14. doi:10.1002/9781119099000.wbabat0270. ISBN 9781405186452.
- Goldsworthy, Adrian (2006). The Fall of Carthage: The Punic Wars 265–146 BC. London: Phoenix. ISBN 978-0-304-36642-2.
- Hoyos, Dexter (2000). "Towards a Chronology of the 'Truceless War', 241–237 B.C.". Rheinisches Museum für Philologie. 143 (3/4): 369–380. JSTOR 41234468.
- Hoyos, Dexter (2007). Truceless War: Carthage's Fight for Survival, 241 to 237 BC. Leiden; Boston: Brill. ISBN 978-90-474-2192-4.
- Hoyos, Dexter (2015) [2011]. "Carthage in Africa and Spain, 241–218". In Hoyos, Dexter (ed.). A Companion to the Punic Wars. Chichester, West Sussex: John Wiley. pp. 204–222. ISBN 978-1-1190-2550-4.
- Lazenby, John (1996). The First Punic War: A Military History. Stanford, California: Stanford University Press. ISBN 978-0-8047-2673-3.
- Miles, Richard (2011). Carthage Must be Destroyed. London: Penguin. ISBN 978-0-141-01809-6.
- Sabin, Philip (1996). "The Mechanics of Battle in the Second Punic War". Bulletin of the Institute of Classical Studies. Supplement. 67 (67): 59–79. JSTOR 43767903.
- Scullard, H.H. (2006) [1989]. "Carthage and Rome". In Walbank, F. W.; Astin, A. E.; Frederiksen, M. W. & Ogilvie, R. M. (eds.). Cambridge Ancient History: Volume 7, Part 2, 2nd Edition. Cambridge: Cambridge University Press. pp. 486–569. ISBN 0-521-23446-8.
- Warmington, Brian (1993) [1960]. Carthage. New York: Barnes & Noble, Inc. ISBN 978-1-56619-210-1.
