= Leptis Parva =

Phoenician colony and Carthaginian and Roman port on Africa's Mediterranean coast

Leptis
- Leptis Minor, Leptis Parva, Leptiminus
- Location within Tunisia
- 35°40′40″N 10°52′00″E
- Location: Tunisia
- Region: Monastir Governorate

Leptis or Lepcis Parva was a Phoenician colony and Carthaginian and Roman port on Africa's Mediterranean coast, corresponding to the modern town Lemta, just south of Monastir, Tunisia. In antiquity, it was one of the wealthiest cities in the region.

== Name ==
The Punic name of the settlement was written lpq (Punic: 𐤋𐤐𐤒) or lpqy (𐤋𐤐𐤒𐤉), signifying either a new "construction" or a "naval station". Phoenician colonies often duplicated their names, as with the two "New Towns" distinguished in English as Carthage and Cartagena. This name was hellenized Léptis (Ancient Greek: Λέπτις). Under the Romans, the Punic name was Latinized as Lepcis or Leptis. It was known variously as Leptis Parva, Leptis Minor, or Leptiminus, all meaning "Lesser Leptis" to distinguish it from the "Greater Leptis" in what is now Libya.

== Geography ==
Leptis was located on the Gulf of Hammamet, the classical Gulf of Neapolis (Latin: Sinus Neapolitanus), between Hadrumetum and Thapsus. It was located in the fertile coastal district of Emporia, in the region of Byzacium, the later Roman province of Byzacena.

== History ==
=== Phoenician colony ===
Leptis was established as a Tyrian colony, probably originally as a waypost on the trade route between Phoenicia and the Strait of Gibraltar. It appears in the periplus of Pseudo-Scylax, written in the middle or latter part of the fourth century BC, as one of the cities in the country of the legendary lotus-eaters.

=== Carthaginian town ===
Like other Phoenician colonies, Leptis came to pay tribute to Carthage. After the First Punic War, Leptis was at the center of the Mercenary War, a revolt of the Carthaginian mercenaries led by Mathos. This was suppressed with difficulty through the coöperation of Hamilcar Barca and Hanno the Great in 238 BC, at the battle of Leptis Parva.

Leptis recovered from the damage and, at the time of the Second Punic War, was one of the wealthiest cities of Emporia. Its tribute to Carthage was equivalent to one Attic talent (26 kg or 57 lb of fairly pure silver) per day. It was at Leptis that Hannibal's army disembarked on their return to Africa in 203 BC. In the following year, Leptis was one of few cities under Roman control in north Africa, the rest of Africa still remaining under the control of the Carthaginian general Hasdrubal.

Following the conclusion of the war in 201 BC, Emporia was overrun by Masinissa, who claimed the district by ancient right. The Carthaginians appealed to Rome for adjudication of the matter, as they were obliged to do by the treaty ending the war. The Roman Senate appointed a commission to look into the matter, including Scipio Africanus, the general credited with Carthage's recent defeat. Although Scipio was uniquely positioned to resolve the dispute, the commission left the rightful possession of Emporia undecided and Masinissa was able to organize much of the territory into the kingdom of Numidia. Leptis itself, however, remained unconquered.

=== Roman city ===
The region around Leptis came under direct Roman rule following the Third Punic War in 146 BC. In Roman times, Leptis was a free city (Latin: civitas libera) with its own autonomous government. Local coins were minted with Greek legends (viz. ΛΕΠΤΙϹ); later coins with Latin inscriptions may show its elevation to colony (colonia) status or may have originated in Leptis Magna.

The possession of Leptis became an important matter during Caesar's Civil War. In 49 BC, Juba I of Numidia was at war with the Leptitani when the war was first carried over into Africa. Juba had long been an ally of Pompey and opposed to Caesar. Caesar's lieutenant Gaius Scribonius Curio deemed it safe to attack Utica, as Juba had left his own lieutenant Sabura in charge of the surrounding countryside. Curio routed a Numidian force with a night-time cavalry raid, but rashly engaged Sabura's main force and was annihilated at the Bagradas as Juba approached from Leptis with reinforcements.

At the beginning of January 46 BC, Caesar arrived at Leptis and received a deputation from the city offering its submission. Caesar placed guards on the city gates to prevent his soldiers from entering the city or harassing its people and sent his cavalry back to their ships to protect the countryside, although the latter were ambushed by a Numidian force. Shortly afterward, Caesar moved his camp to Ruspina, leaving six cohorts at Leptis under the command of Gaius Hostilius Saserna.

During the winter and spring of 46, Leptis was one of Caesar's primary bases and a source of provisions. A cavalry troop sent to Leptis for provisions intercepted a force of Numidian and Gaetulian soldiers, whom they took prisoner after a brief skirmish. Part of Caesar's fleet was anchored off Leptis, where they were taken unawares by Publius Attius Varus, one of Pompey's admirals, who burned Caesar's transports and captured two undefended quinqueremes. Learning of the attack, Caesar rode to Leptis and went in pursuit of Varus with his remaining ships, recapturing one of the quinqueremes along with a trireme. At Hadrumetum, he burned a number of Pompey's transports and captured or put to flight a number of galleys.

Leptis continued to flourish under the empire before Byzacena was ceded to the Vandals in AD 442. The city was retaken by the Byzantine general Belisarius in 533, during the Vandalic War. It then formed part of the Praetorian Prefecture of Africa and later part of the Exarchate of Africa. The city was largely destroyed during the Muslim conquest of the Maghreb in the latter part of the seventh century, although a ribat was built there, probably on the ruins of an earlier Byzantine fortress. The city itself was abandoned and never resettled.

== Religion ==
From the third century until its destruction, Leptis was represented by bishops in various councils of the Roman Catholic Church, including the Councils of Carthage in 256, 411, 484, and 641. The diocese was also involved in the great conflict of African Christianity as Catholic and Donatist bishops for the town appear on the lists of participants in these councils. Among the noted bishops was Laetus, described as a "zealous and very learned man", numbered among those bishops killed by the Vandal king Huneric, after the council of 484.

== See also ==
- Leptis Magna
