= Hannibal (Mercenary War) =

Carthaginian general (died 238 BCE)

- Died: 238 BCE
- Cause of death: Crucifixion
- Occupation: Carthaginian general
- Known for: Participation in the Mercenary War
- Predecessor: Hanno II the Great

Hannibal (Punic: 𐤇𐤍𐤁𐤏𐤋, ḥnbʿl; died 238 BCE) was a Carthaginian general who took part in the Mercenary War between Carthage and rebelling mercenaries. He is not to be confused with Hannibal Barca (247–183/181 BC), a notable commander of the Second Punic War.

During this war, he replaced Hanno II the Great as a commander of the Carthaginian army. He took part in a successful campaign against some rebel cities, along with Hamilcar Barca. During the Siege of Tunis, he was captured during a night raid and crucified, along with some other high-ranking Carthaginians. He was known as an enemy to Rome.

== See also ==
- Hannibal (given name)
