= Victor-Armand Poirson =

French illustrator and cartoonist

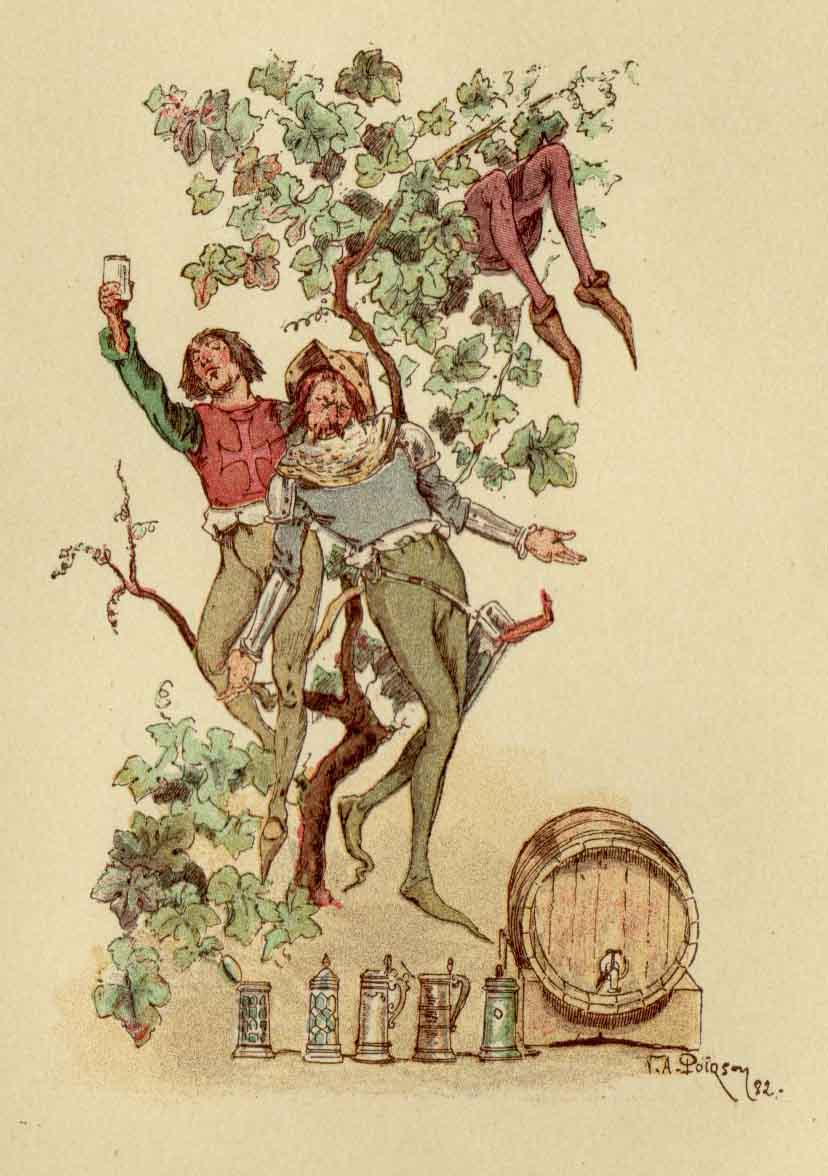
Frontispiece of the book Le Conte de l'archer

Victor-Armand Poirson (19 May 1858 – 13 February 1893) was a French illustrator and cartoonist.

== Biography ==
He illustrated Salammbô by Gustave Flaubert in 1887, L'Âne de Lucius (translation by Paul-Louis Courier) in 1887, The War of Carlo du Monge in 1886, The Tale of the Archer by Armand Silvestre in 1883 (engraved watercolors by Gillot). He also worked for the illustrated newspapers La Vie moderne, Le Chat noir, and Le Journal de la jeunesse.

He died on 13 February 1893, at his home in the 6th arrondissement, in Paris.

== Works ==
=== Illustrated books ===
- Armand Silvestre, Le Conte de l'Archer, Paris, Lahure, 1883
- Jonathan Swift, Gulliver's Travels, Quantin, 1884
- Oliver Goldsmith, The Vicar of Wakefield, 1885
- Gustave Flaubert, Salammbô, Paris, Quantin, 1887
- Catullus, Thetis and Peleus, Paris, Quantin, 1889
