= Nigel Bagnall =

British Army general

Field Marshal Sir Nigel Bagnall GCB CVO MC
- Field Marshal Sir Nigel Bagnall, pictured here in 1989.
- Born: 10 February 1927; India
- Died: 8 April 2002 (aged 75)
- Military career
- Allegiance: United Kingdom
- Branch: British Army
- Service years: 1946–1989
- Rank: Field Marshal
- Service number: 360763
- Units: Green Howards; Parachute Regiment; 4th/7th Royal Dragoon Guards
- Commands: Chief of the General Staff; British Army of the Rhine; I Corps; 4th Division; 4th/7th Royal Dragoon Guards
- Conflicts: Palestine Emergency; Malayan Emergency; Cyprus Emergency; Indonesia–Malaysia confrontation
- Awards: Knight Grand Cross of the Order of the Bath; Commander of the Royal Victorian Order; Military Cross & Bar

Field Marshal Sir Nigel Thomas Bagnall, GCB, CVO, MC (10 February 1927 – 8 April 2002) was a career British Army officer who served as commander-in-chief of the British Army of the Rhine, from 1983 to 1985, and then as chief of the general staff (CGS), the professional head of the British Army, from 1985 to 1988. Early in his military career he saw action during the Palestine Emergency, the Malayan Emergency, the Cyprus Emergency and the Indonesia–Malaysia confrontation, and later in his career he provided advice to the British Government on the future role of Britain's nuclear weapons.

== Army career ==
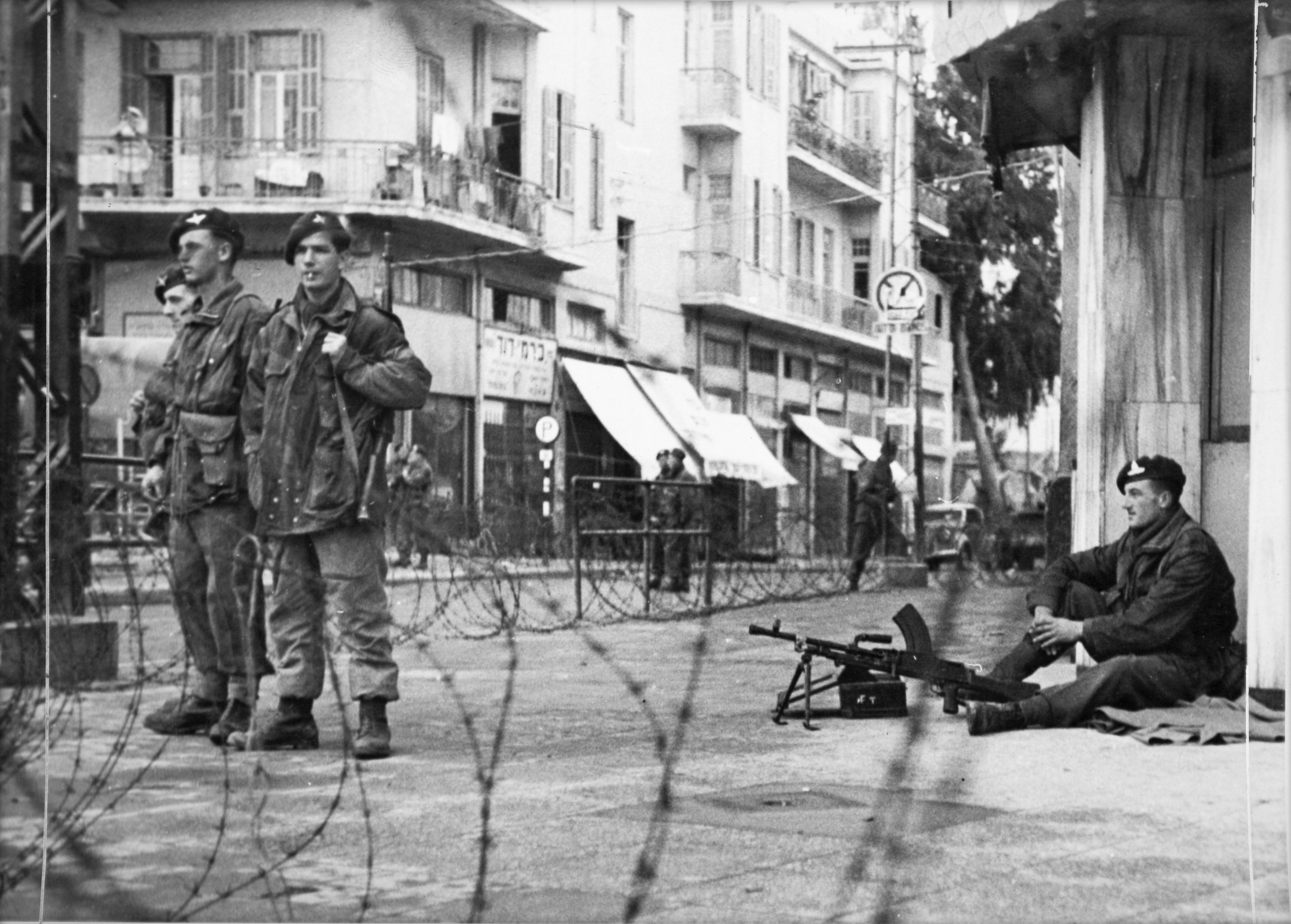
Bagnall served in Palestine in the late 1940s

Born in British India, the son of Lieutenant Colonel Harry Stephen Bagnall and Marjory May Bagnall and educated at Wellington College, Bagnall undertook National Service for a year before being commissioned into the Green Howards on 5 January 1946. Shortly afterwards, however, on 13 February 1946 he transferred to the Parachute Regiment and was deployed to Palestine where the British Mandate was about to end. Promoted to lieutenant on 24 September 1949, he served in Malaya, where as a platoon commander, he was awarded the Military Cross in 1950, and a bar to the Military Cross in 1952.

Promoted to captain on 10 February 1954, he returned to the Green Howards in summer 1954 and then took part in counter-insurgency operations against EOKA units in Cyprus in 1955. He transferred to the 4th/7th Royal Dragoon Guards on 24 April 1956. He was promoted to major on 10 February 1961 and appointed military assistant to the vice-chief of defence staff in May 1964 and then became the senior staff officer dealing with intelligence activities for operations in Borneo in March 1966.

Promoted to lieutenant colonel on 31 December 1966, he became the commanding officer of the 4th/7th Royal Dragoon Guards in 1967 and served in that capacity in Omagh in Northern Ireland and Sennelager in Germany. Promoted to colonel on 31 December 1969, he became Commander Royal Armoured Corps in 1st (British) Corps in December 1970, before receiving further promotion to brigadier on 31 December 1970. He went on to be Secretary of the Chiefs of Staff Committee at the Ministry of Defence in September 1973. He was appointed general officer commanding (GOC) of the 4th Division on 21 September 1975 with the substantive rank of major general from 1 November 1975 and Assistant Chief of Defence Staff (Policy) at the Ministry of Defence on 7 January 1978.

He became commander of 1st (British) Corps on 1 November 1980 with the rank of lieutenant general and, having been appointed a Knight Commander of the Order of the Bath in the New Year Honours 1981, went on to be commander-in-chief of the British Army of the Rhine and commander of NATO's Northern Army Group with the rank of general on 1 July 1983. As commander of the Northern Army Group he grappled with NATO's strategy of forward defence, when he persuaded the Germans that some ground would have to be surrendered to withstand a massive Soviet Army attack.

After being advanced to a Knight Grand Cross of the Order of the Bath in the Queen's Birthday Honours 1985 and also becoming ADC to the Queen on 30 July 1985, he was appointed Chief of the General Staff in August 1985 in which capacity he was closely involved in the debate about the future role of Britain's nuclear weapons. He was promoted to field marshal on 9 September 1988 on his retirement from the British Army.

He was also appointed colonel commandant of the Army Physical Training Corps on 5 February 1981 and colonel commandant of the Royal Armoured Corps on 1 August 1985.

In retirement he became a military historian and fellow of Balliol College, Oxford. He wrote a history of the Punic Wars published in 1990 and, two years after his death, he had a history of the Peloponnesian War published.

He died on 8 April 2002, at the age of 75.

== Family ==
In 1959 he married Anna Caroline Church; they had two daughters.

== Historiographical works ==
- Bagnall, Nigel, The Punic Wars: Rome, Carthage and the Struggle for the Mediterranean, London: Hutchinson, 1990, ISBN 0-091-74421-0.
- Bagnall, Nigel, The Peloponnesian War: Athens, Sparta and the Struggle for Greece, London: Pimlico, 2004, ISBN 978-0-712-69881-8.

Military offices
Preceded by Michael Gow	GOC 4th Division; 1975–1977	Succeeded by Richard Vickers
Preceded by Sir Peter Leng	GOC I Corps; 1980–1983	Succeeded by Sir Martin Farndale
Preceded by Sir Michael Gow	Commander-in-chief of the British Army of the Rhine; 1983–1985	Succeeded by Sir Martin Farndale
Preceded by Sir John Stanier	Chief of the General Staff; 1985–1988	Succeeded by Sir John Chapple
