= Hanno the Great =

Hanno the Great may refer to any of three different leaders of ancient Carthage:

- Hanno I the Great (4th century BC)
- Hanno II the Great (3rd century BC)
- Hanno III the Great (2nd century BC)

According to B. H. Warmington, the nickname was probably a family name or a term not well understood by the ancient Greek or Roman writers. Gilbert Charles-Picard and Colette Picard assign the men Roman numerals to distinguish them: Hanno I the Great, Hanno II the Great and Hanno III the Great. Warmington does not use Roman numerals, nor does Dexter Hoyos.

The nicknames for these three Hannos come from different primary sources. Hanno I is called magnus (Latin for "great") in the table of contents of Trogus' history. Hanno II and Hanno III are called megas in Greek in the histories of Appian and Zonaras. Sometimes it taken to be a translation of the Punic title rab, meaning "chief", but this is unlikely. It does not appear in any other Greek or Latin source and may indicate the utilization of a Punic genealogical source and, hence, its status as a family name.
