= Olivier Picard =

French archaeologist (1940–2023)

- Born: 4 March 1940; Bernay, France
- Died: 1 September 2023 (aged 83); Thasos, Greece
- Education: École normale supérieure
- Occupation: Hellenist
- Parent(s): Gilbert Charles-Picard; Colette Picard

Olivier Picard (4 March 1940 – 1 September 2023) was a French archeologist. He was director of the French School at Athens and a member of the Institut de France.

== Biography ==
Olivier Picard was born on 4 March 1940, as the eldest son of Gilbert Charles-Picard and Colette Picard, both historians and archaeologists, and the grandson of Hellenist Charles Picard. A student at the École normale supérieure (1960), Olivier Picard obtained his agrégation of history in 1964 and became a member of the French School at Athens (1966–1971). He immediately began his academic career at the Paris West University Nanterre La Défense (1971) where he was appointed a professor in 1979.

From 1981 until 1992, he was director of the French School at Athens.

Back in Nanterre, he was quickly elected at Paris IV-Sorbonne where he directed the graduate school of ancient and medieval history.

He led excavations on the sites of Thasos and Lato.

Picard was president of the Société française de numismatique and of the "Association des études grecques". On 24 April 2009, he was elected a member of the Académie des Inscriptions et Belles-Lettres, in François Chamoux's seat.

Olivier Picard died on 1 September 2023 in Thasos, Greece at the age of 83.

== Publications ==
- 1971: Collection Hélène Stathatos. Bd. IV, 1: Bijoux et petits objets
- 1979: Chalcis et la confédération eubéenne. Étude de numismatique et d’histoire
- 1980: Les Grecs face à la menace perse
- 1980: with G. Reynaud: Catalogue de la donation Henry Vernin. Monnaies grecques
- 1992: with J.-F. Bommelaer, E. Pentazos: La redécouverte de Delphes
- 2000: Guerre et économie dans l’alliance athénienne (490-322 av. J.-C.)
- 2003: Royaumes et cités hellénistiques de 323 à 55 av. J.-C.
- 2005: L’exception égyptienne ? Production et échanges monétaires en Égypte hellénistique et romaine, actes du colloque d’Alexandrie, 13–15 April 2002, Frédérique Duyrat and Olivier Picard publishers, Études alexandrines 10, Cairo, reprinted in 2008, 391 p. ISBN 272470410X
- 2007: with J.-N. Barrandon: Monnaies de Bronze de Marseille, Analyse, classement, politique monétaire
- 2011: with Th. Faucher, M.-Chr. Marcellesi: 2011. Nomisma, La circulation monétaire dans le monde grec antique
- 2012: Les monnaies des fouilles du Centre d’Études alexandrines, Les monnayages de bronze à Alexandrie de la conquête d’Alexandre à l’Égypte moderne
