= Edmond Levy =

Edmond Levy may refer to:

- Edmond Lévy (born 1934), French classical historian
- Edmond Levy (judge) (1941–2014), Israeli Supreme Court judge
- Edmond Levy (director) (1929–1998), Canadian-American documentary filmmaker (A Year Toward Tomorrow)
