= Hanno III the Great =

Hanno III the Great (Punic: 𐤇𐤍𐤀, ḤNʾ) was a conservative politician at Carthage during the 2nd century BC. He is known only through the historian Appian. At the outbreak of the Third Punic War, he stood for a good relationship with Rome and viewed Africa, rather than Spain, as a possible place of expansion. Leading a large section of the Carthaginian aristocracy, he rendered the efforts of the Barcid family in Spain useless.

It is possible that Hanno, who is not recorded by Appian as playing any role in the third war itself, never existed and is the product of Appian's confusion. This would make him a double of Hanno II the Great.

== Bibliography ==
- Charles-Picard, Gilbert; Picard, Colette. Life and Death of Carthage. Taplinger, 1968.
- Hoyos, Dexter. The Carthaginians. Routledge, 2010.
- Huss, Werner. Geschichte der Karthager. C.H. Beck, 1985. ISBN 9783406306549
- Scullard, H. H.; Cary, M. A History of Rome: Down to the Reign of Constantine. Palgrave, 1976.
- Warmington, B. H. Carthage. Robert Hale, 1960.
