= Yvonne Picard =

French philosopher

- Born: 1 August 1920; Athens, Greece
- Died: 9 March 1943 (aged 22); Auschwitz, Poland
- Education: University of Paris
- Family: Charles Picard (father); Gilbert Charles-Picard (brother)

Yvonne Picard (1 August 1920 – 9 March 1943) was a French philosopher and a member of the French Resistance during the Second World War. She and her brother, the historian Gilbert Charles-Picard, were the children of the archaeologist Charles Picard.

Yvonne Picard was born in Athens, Greece, her father being head of the French School at Athens at the time. She obtained a degree in philosophy from the University of Paris and became an adherent of Marxism. She began teaching at the École normale supérieure at Sèvres.

In 1941, she joined the "Socialisme et Liberté" group founded by the philosopher Jean-Paul Sartre, and also joined the Resistance. She soon left Sartre's group, believing it "amateurish", instead joining the Communist Youth. The police traced her through her connection with a member of the Francs-Tireurs et Partisans, and obtained her address from her unsuspecting parents. Her Paris associates included Raoul Lévy and Bianca Lamblin. Along with her fiancé, Gaston Étiévent, she was arrested in May 1942. Étiévent was shot without trial in August 1942, and Yvonne Picard was imprisoned at Fort de Romainville; she was later deported to Auschwitz concentration camp, leaving Compiègne by a transport of 24 January 1943. They were taken to the women's prison at Birkenau. Suffering from dysentery, Picard was admitted to the hospital called the "Revier", where she died shortly afterwards.

== Publications ==
- "Le Temps chez Husserl et chez Heidegger", Deucalion, 1946, No. 1, p. 93-124
- Alphonde de Waelhens, Jean Wahl, Aimé Patri, Yvonne Picard, "Remarques sur une nouvelle doctrine de la liberté", Deucalion, 1946, No. 1, p. 75-92
