= 69 (sex position) =

Oral sex position

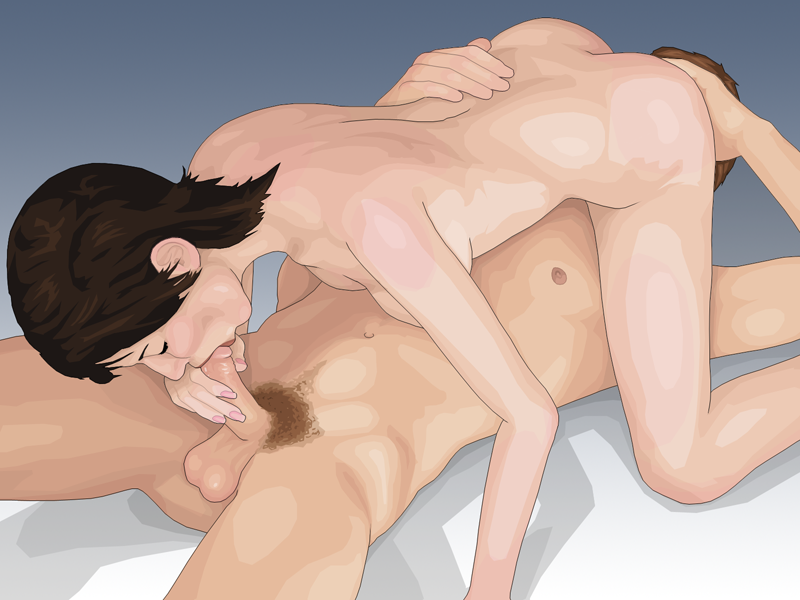
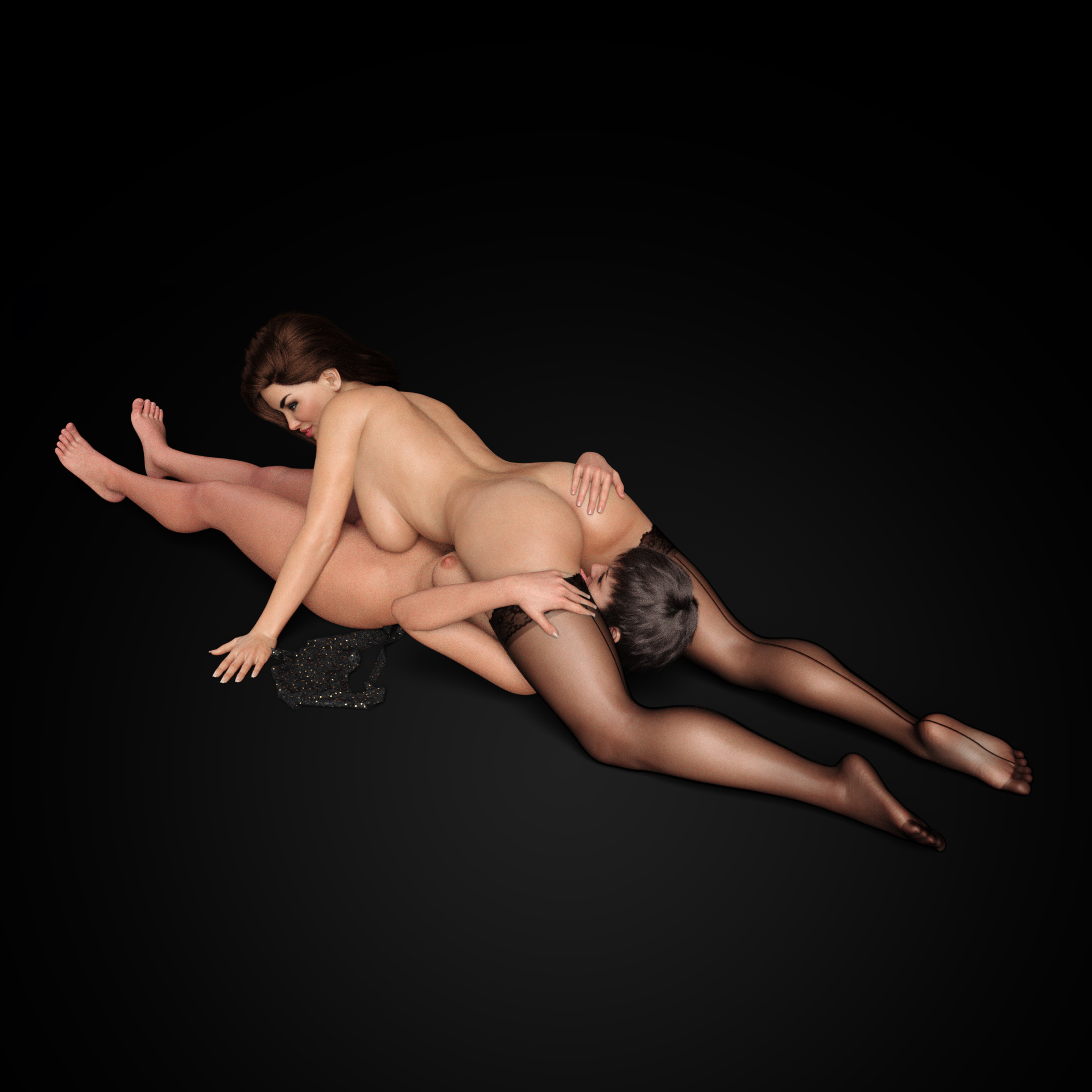
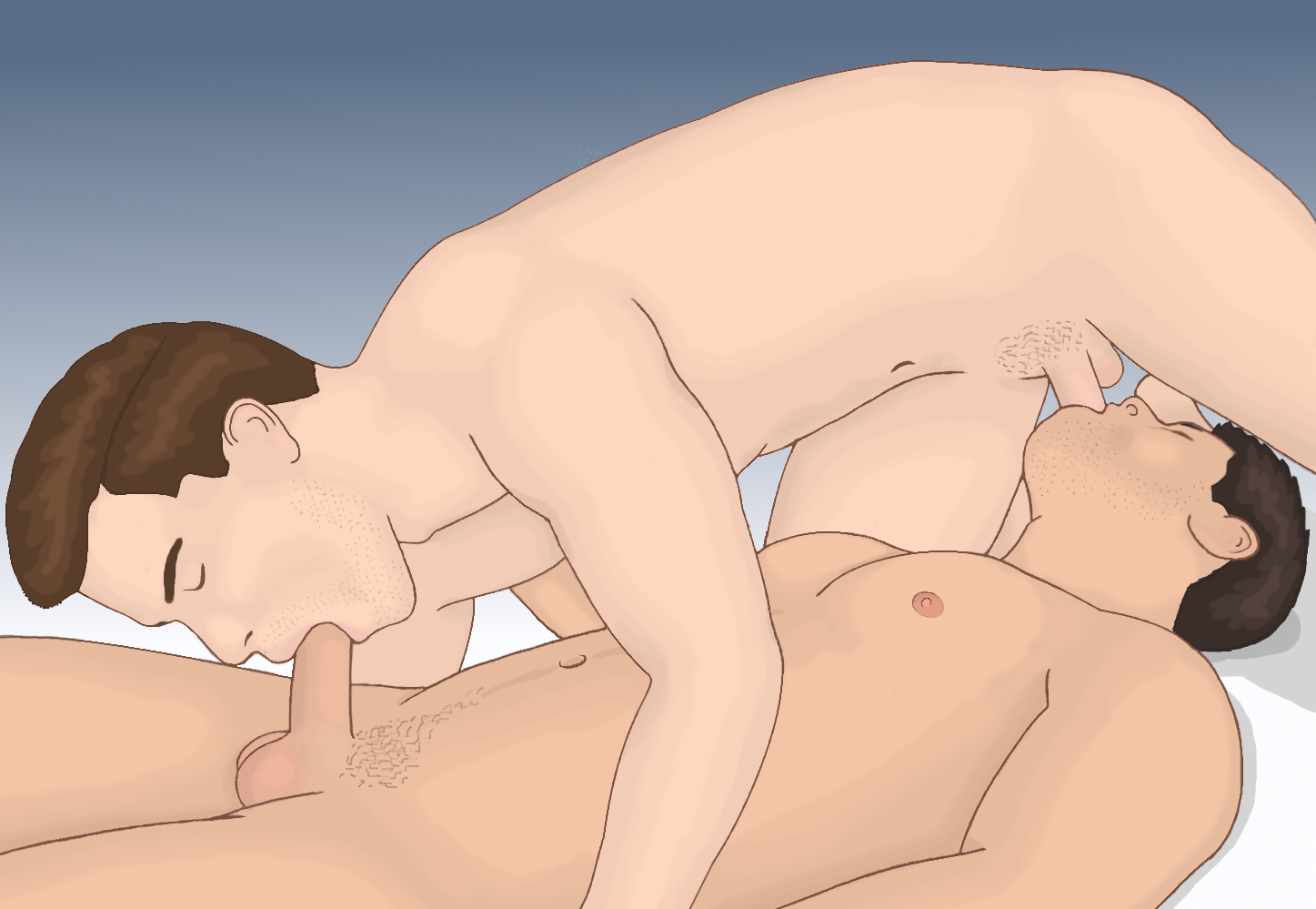
Depictions of mutual oral sex in the 69 position.
Left: a heterosexual couple, Center: a lesbian couple, Right: a gay couple

69 or sixty-nine is a sex position in which two people align themselves so that each person's mouth is near the other's genitals, allowing each partner to simultaneously perform oral sex on the other. The participants are thus mutually inverted like in the number 69 (69), hence the code name. In this case, the numerals 6 and 9 are treated more as pictographic symbols than as numerical representations, with the bulbous part representing the heads of the performers.

The name is a translation of the original French, soixante-neuf, which is also sometimes borrowed directly into English. The concept is that both partners can experience sexual stimulation and oral sensation simultaneously, but this can also distract those who try to focus solely on their own pleasure from giving oral sex well. The position can also be awkward for partners who are not similar in height.

== History ==
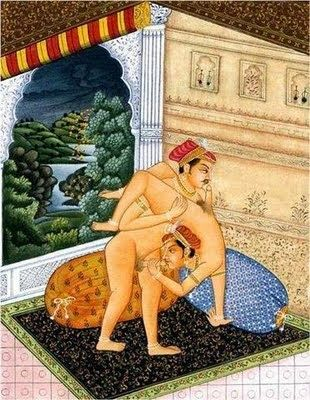
Indian art depicting two men performing 69 in a complicated position.

The term sixty-nine or soixante-neuf for mutual simultaneous oral-genital stimulation is an English translation of the euphemistic French term "soixante-neuf" (i.e., "sixty-nine"). The term "soixante-neuf" has not been traced any earlier than the Whore's Catechisms published in the 1790s in France, usually attributed to an early leader of the French Revolution, Mlle. Theroigne de Mericourt.

Legman has described how the concept dates back to at least ancient Roman times:

"The earliest unequivocal representation of the sixty-nine appears to be that on an oil-lamp preserved in the Munich Museum (Deutsches Museum), and first reproduced in Dr. Gaston Vorberg's ... portfolio, Die Erotik der Antiken in Kleinkunst und Keramik (Munich, 1921) plate 58, showing the woman lying on top of the man. Dr. Vorberg gives this ... to be of the period of the Roman Caesars ... . However, another oil-lamp of the same kind, showing the sixty-nine almost identically ... is more recently reproduced as a full-color plate, in Prof. Jean Marcadé's Eros Kalos (English-language edition, Geneva : Nagel, 1965), facing page 58, in ... lamps preserved in the Heracleion Museum in Greece."

Legman has also elaborated on Hindu representations:

"A Hindu temple-sculpture from the sacred caverns of the island of Elephanta, near Mumbai in India, showing this position with the man actually standing, and holding the woman hanging down in this from his shoulders, was ... brought to England in the late eighteenth century ... . ... this sculptured fragment ... is both discussed and illustrated in Richard Payne Knight's A Discourse on the Worship of Priapus, privately issued for the Dilettanti Society of London in 1786 ... . The illustration in question is a detail engraving given in Payne Knight's plate XI; and the full form of this sculptured group is ... given as plate XXIV."

The Kama Sutra mentions this sex position, albeit by a different name: "When a man and woman lie down in an inverted order, i.e. with the head of the one towards the feet of the other and carry on [mouth] congress, it is called the 'congress of a crow'."

=== Internet meme ===
In reference to the sex position, "69" has become an Internet meme, where users will respond to any occurrence of the number with the word "nice" and draw specific attention to it. This is meant to sarcastically imply that the reference to the sex position was intentional. Because of its association with the sex position and resulting meme, "69" has become known as "the sex number" in these communities, similar to the number 420, which is known as "the weed number".

== Variations ==
Variations of the 69 position include mutual anilingus or "double rimming", and digital penetration of either partner's anus or vagina.

== See also ==
- Cunnilingus – Oral sex on the vulva by a sexual partner
- Fellatio – Oral sex on the penis by a sexual partner
