= Pierre Roussel (epigrapher) =

French epigrapher and historian (1881–1945)

- Born: 23 February 1881; Nancy, France
- Died: 1 October 1945 (aged 64); Paris, France
- Occupations: Historian; Epigrapher

Pierre Roussel (23 February 1881 – 1 October 1945) was a 20th-century French epigrapher and historian, director of the French School at Athens from 1925 to 1935.

== Biography ==
A student with Paul Perdrizet at the faculty for letters of Nancy, he joined the École Normale Supérieure and obtained the agrégation de lettres.

As member of the French School of Athens, he participated in the research program established by Théophile Homolle in Delos and worked on the epigraphy of the site. He then searched the great Egyptian and Syrian ensembles west of Cynthus.

Chosen by Ulrich von Wilamowitz-Moellendorff to edit the catalog of dedications and decrees of Delos (1914) for issue IV of the Inscriptiones Graecae, he defended his thesis in 1916.

Professor at the lycée Janson-de-Sailly during World War II, he became master of conferences on Greek literature and language at Bordeaux University in 1918, then in Strasbourg and took the direction of the French School at Athens in 1925. In addition to Delos, he directed excavations at Malia, Thasos and Philippi. In 1935, he was appointed at the Chair of Greek history of the Sorbonne.

In 1930 he was elected a corresponding member of the Académie des Inscriptions et Belles-Lettres then full member in 1937.

== Works ==
- 1916: Délos, colonie athénienne, (thesis)
- 1925: Délos
- 1922: La Grèce et l'Orient, des guerres médiques à la conquête romaine
- 1935–1937: Inscriptions de Délos, with Félix Dürrbach and M. Launay, 3 vols.
- 1939: Sparte

== Bibliography ==
- René Dussaud, Pierre Roussel, in Syria, 1944–1945, (p. 290–291)
- Raymond Lantier, Notice sur la vie et les travaux de Pierre Roussel, in Recueil de l'Institut de France, 1949
- Ève Gran-Aymerich, Les Chercheurs de passé, Éditions du CNRS, 2007, (p. 1132)
