= History of early Tunisia =

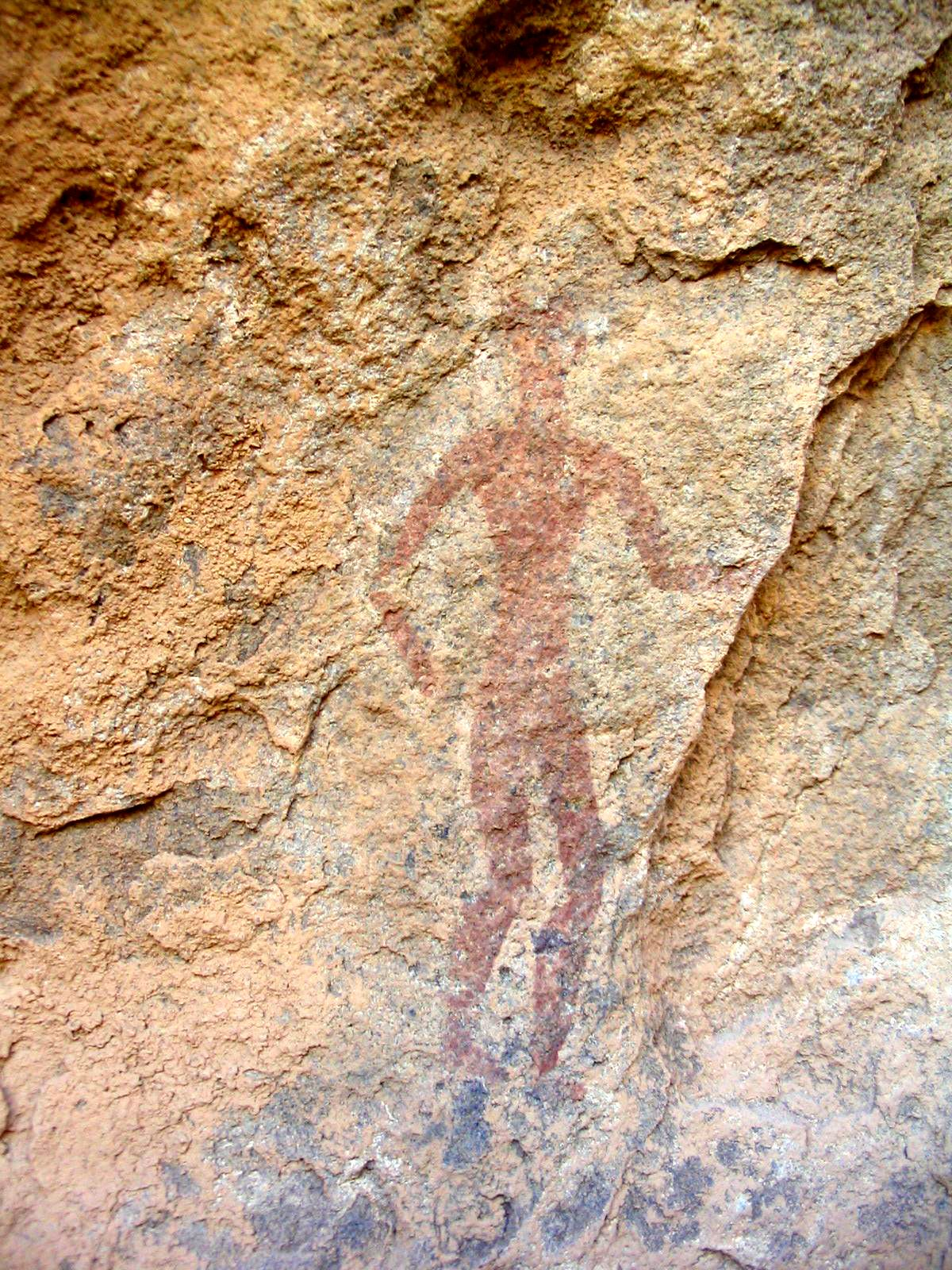
Rock art of the Hoggar Mountains

Human habitation in the North African region began over two million years ago. Remains of Homo erectus during the Middle Pleistocene period, has been found in North Africa. The Berbers, who generally antedate by many millennia the Phoenicians and the establishment of Carthage, are understood to have arisen out of social events shaped by the confluence of several earlier peoples, i.e., the Capsian culture, events which eventually constituted their ethnogenesis. Thereafter Berbers lived as an independent people in North Africa, including the Tunisian region.

On the most distant prehistoric epochs, the scattered evidence sheds a rather dim light. Also obscure is the subsequent "pre-Berber" situation, which later evolved into the incidents of Berber origins and early development. Yet Berber languages indicates a singular, ancient perspective. This field of study yields a suggested reconstruction of remote millennia of Berber prehistory, and insight into the ancient cultural and lineage relations of Tunisian Berbers—not only with their neighboring Berber brothers, but with other more distant peoples.

The prehistoric, of course, seamlessly passes into the earliest historic. The first meeting of Phoenician and Berber occurred well to the east of Tunisia, well before the rise of Carthage: a tenth-century invasion of Phoenicia was led by a pharaoh of the Berbero-Libyan dynasty (the XXII) of Ancient Egypt.

In the Maghreb, the first written records describing the Berbers begin with the Tunisian region, proximate to the founding there of Carthage. Surviving Punic writings are scarce aside from funerary and votive inscriptions; remains of the ancient Berber script is also limited. The earliest written reports come from later Greek and Roman authors. From discovery of archaic material culture and such writings, early Berber culture and society, and religion, can be somewhat surmised.

Tunisia remained the leading region of the Berber peoples throughout the Punic era (and Roman, and into the Islamic). Here modern commentary and reconstructions are presented concerning their ancient livelihood, domestic culture, and social organization, including tribal confederacies. Evidence comes from various artifacts, settlement and burial sites, inscriptions, and historical writings; supplementary views are derived by disciplines studying genetics and linguistics.

== People of early North Africa ==
=== Pharaohs connected to Egypt by Tunisia ===
Evidence of habitation in the North African region by human ancestors has been found stretching back one or two million years, yet not to rival those most-ancient finds in south and east Africa. Remains of Homo erectus during the Middle Pleistocene, circa 750 kya (thousands of years ago), has been found in North Africa. These were associated with the change in early hominid tool use form pebble-choppers to hand-axes.

Migrations out of south and east Africa since 100 Kya are thought to have established current human populations worldwide. Cavalli-Sforza includes the Berber populations in a much larger genetic group, one which also includes S.W. Asians, Iranians, Europeans, Sardinians, Indians, S.E. Indians, and Lapps.

"[B]y definition prehistoric archaeology is dealing with pre-written sources only, so that all prehistory is anonymous." Hence, "it is inevitably mainly concerned with the material culture" such as "stone tools, bronze weapons, hut foundations, tombs, field walks, and the like." ... "We have no way of learning the moral and religious ideas of the protohistoric city dwellers... ."

Regarding the evidence of prehistory, very remote epochs often give clues only about physical anthropology, i.e., per biological remains re human evolution. Usually the later millennia progressively disclose more and more cultural information yet, absent writings, it is mostly limited to "material culture". Generally cultural data is considered a far more telling indication of prehistoric human behavior and society, as compared to only evidence of physical human remains.

The cultural data available about human prehistory derived from material artifacts, however, too often directly concerns "non-essentials". It is limited as a useful source about the finer details of archaic human societies—the ethical norms, the individual dilemmas—when compared to the data from written sources. "When prehistorians speak of the ideas and ideals of men before writing, they are making guesses--intelligent guesses by people best qualified to make them, but nevertheless guesses."

Perhaps the most significant prehistoric finding worldwide concerns events surrounding the Neolithic Revolution. Then humans developed significant jumps in cognitive ability. The evidence of the art and expressive artifacts dating back about 10 to 12 kya show a new sophistication in handling experience, perhaps being the fruits of prior advances in the articulation of symbols and language. Herding and farming develop. A new phase of human evolution had begun. "The rich heritage of rock painting in North Africa... seem to date after the Pleistocene period... around twelve thousand years ago." Thus a period concurrent with the "neolithic" revolution.

=== Mesolithic era ===
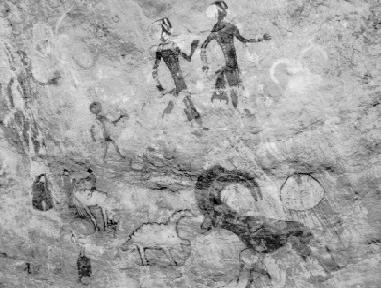
Saharan cave painting from Tassili n'Ajjer [Berber: Plateau of the Chasms]

Dating to the much more recent Mesolithic era, stone blades and tools, as well as small stone human figurines, of the Capsian culture (named after Gafsa in Tunisia) are associated with the prehistoric presence of Berbers in North Africa. The Capsian is that archaic culture native to the Maghrib region, circa twelve to eight kya. During this period the Pleistocene came to an end with the last ice age, causing changes in the Mediterranean climate. The African shore slowly became drier as the "rain belts moved north". Also related to the Berbers are some of the prehistoric monuments built using very large rocks (dolmens). Located both in Europe and Africa, these dolmens are found at locations throughout the western Mediterranean. The Capsian culture was preceded by the Ibero-Maurusian in North Africa.

=== Saharan rock art ===
Saharan rock art, the inscriptions and the paintings that show various design patterns as well as figures of animals and of humans, are attributed to the Berbers and also to black Africans from the south. Dating these art works has proven difficult and unsatisfactory. Egyptian influence is considered very unlikely. Some images infer a terrain much better watered. Among the animals depicted, alone or in staged scenes, are large-horned buffalo (the extinct bubalus antiquus), elephants, donkeys, colts, rams, herds of cattle, a lion and lioness with three cubs, leopards or cheetahs, hogs, jackals, rhinoceroses, giraffes, hippopotamus, a hunting dog, and various antelope. Human hunters may wear animal masks and carry their weapons. Herders are shown with elaborate head ornamentation; a few dance. Other human figures drive chariots, or ride camels.

=== Theory of mixed origin ===
A commonly held view of Berber origins is that Paleo-Mediterranean peoples long occupying the region combined with several other largely Mediterranean groups, two from the east near S.W.Asia and bringing the Berber languages about eight to ten kya (one traveling west along the coast and the other by way of the Sahel and the Sahara), with a third intermingling earlier from Iberia. "At all events, the historic peopling of the Maghrib is certainly the result of a merger, in proportions not yet determined, of three elements: Ibero-Maurusian, Capsian and Neolithic," the last being "true proto-Berbers".

Cavalli-Sforza also makes two related observations. First, the Berbers and those S.W. Asians who speak Semitic idioms together belong to a large and ancient language family (the Afroasiatic), which dates back perhaps ten kya. Second, this large language family incorporates in its ranks members from two different genetic groups, i.e., (a) some elements of the one listed by Cavalli-Sforza immediately above, and (b) one called by him the Ethiopian group. This Ethiopian group inhabits lands from the Horn to the Sahel region of Africa. In agreement with Cavalli-Sforza's work, recent demographic study indicates a common Neolithic origin for both the Berber and Semitic populations. A widespread opinion is that the Berbers are a mixed ethnic group sharing the related and ancient Berber languages.

Perhaps eight millennia ago, already there were prior peoples established here, among whom the proto-Berbers (coming from the east) mingled and mixed, and from whom the Berber people would spring, during an era of their ethnogenesis. Today half or more of modern Tunisians appear to be the descendants, however mixed or not, of ancient Berber ancestors.

== Berber language history ==
Afroasiatic language family. With adjustment this map may illustrate the relative situation of widely spoken, ancient Berber. Except for the Punic language spoken at Carthage and its sphere of trade, (also except for the Ethiopian {marked here Tigre & Amharic}), the Semitic 'branch' languages were not generally spoken in ancient Africa. Later with the spread of Islam (after 632), Arabic supplanted remnant Punic, and also other non-Semitic 'branch' languages of Afroasiatic: ancient Egyptian by the Nile, and in many areas of North Africa the Berber languages.

In the study of languages, sophisticated techniques were developed enabling the understanding of how an idiom evolves over time. Hence, the speech of past ages may be successively reconstructed in theory by using only modern speech and the rules of phonetic and morphological change, and other learning, which may be augmented by and checked against the literature of the past, if available. Methods of Comparative linguistics also assisted in associating related 'sister' languages, which together stem from an ancient parent language. Further, such groups of related languages may form branches of even larger language families, e.g., Afroasiatic.

=== Afroasiatic family ===
Taken together the twenty odd Berber languages constitute one of the five branches of Afroasiatic, a pivotal world language family, which stretches from Mesopotamia and Arabia to the Nile river and to the Horn of Africa, across northern Africa to Lake Chad and to the Atlas Mountains by the Atlantic Ocean. The other four branches of Afroasiatic are: Ancient Egyptian, Semitic (which includes Akkadian, Aramaic, Hebrew, Arabic, and Amharic), Cushitic (around the Horn and the lower Red Sea), and Chadic (e.g., Hausa). The Afroasiatic language family has great diversity among its member idioms and a corresponding antiquity in time depth, both as to the results of analyses in historical linguistics and as regards the seniority of its written records, composed using the oldest of writing systems. The combination of linguistic studies with other information about prehistory taken from archaeology and the biological sciences has been adumbrated. Earlier academic speculation as to the prehistoric homeland of Afroasiatic and its geographic spread centered on a source in southwest Asia, but more recent work in the various related disciplines has focused on Africa.

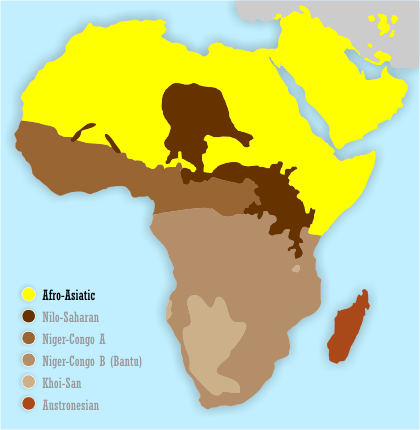
Afro-Asiatic languages, distribution shown in yellow

=== Proposed prehistory ===
The conjecture proposed by linguist and historian Igor M. Diakonoff may be summarized. From a prehistoric homeland near Darfur, which was better watered, the "Egyptians" were the first to break from the proto Afroasiatic communities, before ten kya (thousand years ago). These proto Egyptian language speakers headed north. During the next millennium or so, proto-Semitic and -Berber speakers went their divergent ways. The Semites passed by the then marshlands of the lower Nile and crossed into Asia (evidently the Semitic speakers anciently present in Ethiopia remained in Africa or later crossed back to Africa from Arabia). Meanwhile, the peoples who spoke proto-Berbero-Libyan spread out westward across North Africa, along the Mediterranean coast and into a Sahara region then better watered, traveling in a centuries-long migration until reaching the Atlantic and its offshore islands. Later, Diakonoff revised his proposed prehistory, moving the Afroasiatic homeland north toward the lower Nile, then a land of lakes and marshes. This change reflects several linguistic analyses showing that common Semitic then shared very little "cultural" lexicon with the common Afroasiatic. Hence the proto Semitic speakers probably left the common Afroasiatic community earlier, by ten kya (thousand years ago), starting from an area nearby a more fruitful Sinai. Accordingly, he situates the related Berbero-Libyan speakers of that era by the coast, to the west of the lower Nile.

== The early Berbers ==
=== Culture and society ===
By perhaps seven kya (thousand years ago) a Neolithic culture was evolving among a coalescence of people, the Berbers, in northwest Africa. Earlier, at the long-occupied cave of Haua Fteah in Cyrenaica, "food gatherers with a Caspian flint industry were succeeded by stock breeders with pottery." Material culture progressed, resulting in the Neolithic Revolution with its animal domestication and agriculture advances; craft techniques included imprinted pottery, and finely chipped stone implements (evolved from earlier arrowheads).

"The food gatherers who built up the shell middens round the salt lakes of Tunisia were succeeded by simple food producers, with little change in their flint industry... described as a 'Neolithic of Capsian tradition'. [H]ere at least native food gatherers were not displaced by immigrant farmers [from the east] but themselves adopted a food-producing economy. [In the] Maghreb simple farming culture survived very little alterred for millennia. A site with impressed pottery might date to the sixth millennium b.c. or the second."

Wheat and barley were sown, beans and chickpeas cultivated. Ceramic bowls and basins, goblets, large plates, as well as dishes raised by a central column, were domestic items in daily use, sometimes hung up on the wall. For clothing findings indicate hooded cloaks, and cloth woven into stripes of different colors. Sheep, goats, and cattle measured wealth. From physical evidence unearthed in Tunisia archaeologists present the Berbers as already "farmers with a strong pastoral element in their economy and fairly elaborate cemeteries", well over a thousand years before the Phoenicians arrived to found Carthage.

Apparently, prior to written records about them, sedentary rural Berbers lived in semi-independent farming villages, composed of small, composite, tribal units under a local leader who worked to harmonize its clans. Management of the affairs in such early Berber villages was probably shared with a council of elders. By particularly fertile regions, the larger villages arose. Yet seasonally the villagers might have left to find the better pasture for their herds and flocks. On the marginal lands, the more pastoral tribes of Berbers roamed widely to find grazing for their animals. Modern conjecture is that feuding between neighborhood clans at first impeded organized political life among these ancient Berber farmers, so that social coordination did not develop beyond the village level, whose internal harmony could vary. Tribal authority was strongest among the wandering pastoralists, much weaker among the agricultural villagers, and would later attenuate further with the advent of cities connected to strong commercial networks and foreign polities.

Throughout the Maghrib (particularly in what is now Tunisia), the Berbers reacted to the growing military threat from colonies started by Phoenician traders. Eventually Carthage and its sister city-states would inspire Berber villages to join in order to marshall large-scale armies, which naturally called forth strong, centralizing leadership. Punic social techniques from the nearby prosperous cities were adopted by the Berbers, to be modified for their own use. To the east, the Berbero-Libyans had already interacted with the Egyptians during the millennial rise of the ancient Nile civilization.

=== Shared heritage ===
The people commonly known today as the Berbers were anciently more often known as Libyans. Yet many "Berbers" have for long self-identified as Imazighen or "free people" (etymology uncertain). Mommsen, a widely admired historian of the 19th century, stated:

"They call themselves in the Riff near Tangier Amâzigh, in the Sahara Imôshagh, and the same name meets us, referred to particular tribes, on several occasions among the Greeks and Romans, thus as Maxyes at the founding of Carthage, as Mazices in the Roman period at different places in the Mauretanian north coast; the similar designation that has remained with the scattered remnants proves that this great people has once had a consciousness, and has permanently retained the impression, of the relationship of its members."

Other names, according to Mommsen, were used by their ancient neighbors: Libyans (by Egyptians and later by Greeks), Nomades (by Greeks), Numidians (by Romans), and later Berbers (by the Arabs); also the self-descriptive Mauri in the west; and Gaetulians in the south.

Several ancient names of Berber polities may be related to their self-designated identity as Imazighen. The Egyptians knew as pharaohs the leaders of a powerful Berber tribe called Meshwesh of the XXII dynasty. Located near Carthage was the Berber kingdom of Massyli, later called Numidia, ruled by Masinissa and his descendants.

Berbers together, with their relations and descendants, have been the major population group to inhabit the Maghrib (North African apart from the Nile) since about eight kya (thousand years ago). This region includes terrain from the Nile to the Atlantic, encompassing the vast Sahara at whose center rise the mountain heights of Ahaggar and Tibesti. In the west the Mediterranean coastlands are suitable for agriculture, having for hinterland the Atlas Mountains. It includes the land now known as Tunisia.

Yet the most ancient written records concerning the Berber peoples are those reported by neighboring peoples of the Mediterranean region. When the Berbers enter history during the first millennium BCE, their own points of view on situations and events are not available to us. Due to the impact of Carthage, it is the people of Tunisia who dominate the early historical writings on the Berbers.

== Accounts of the Berbers ==
Here described are Berber peoples in the first light of history, drawn from written records left by Egyptians in northeast Africa, and mainly by Greek and Roman authors in northwest Africa. To the east of Tunisia, a Libyan dynasty ruled in Egypt; their armies marched into Phoenicia a century before the founding of Carthage. Next is described Berber life and society in Tunisia and to its west, both before and during the hegemony of Carthage.

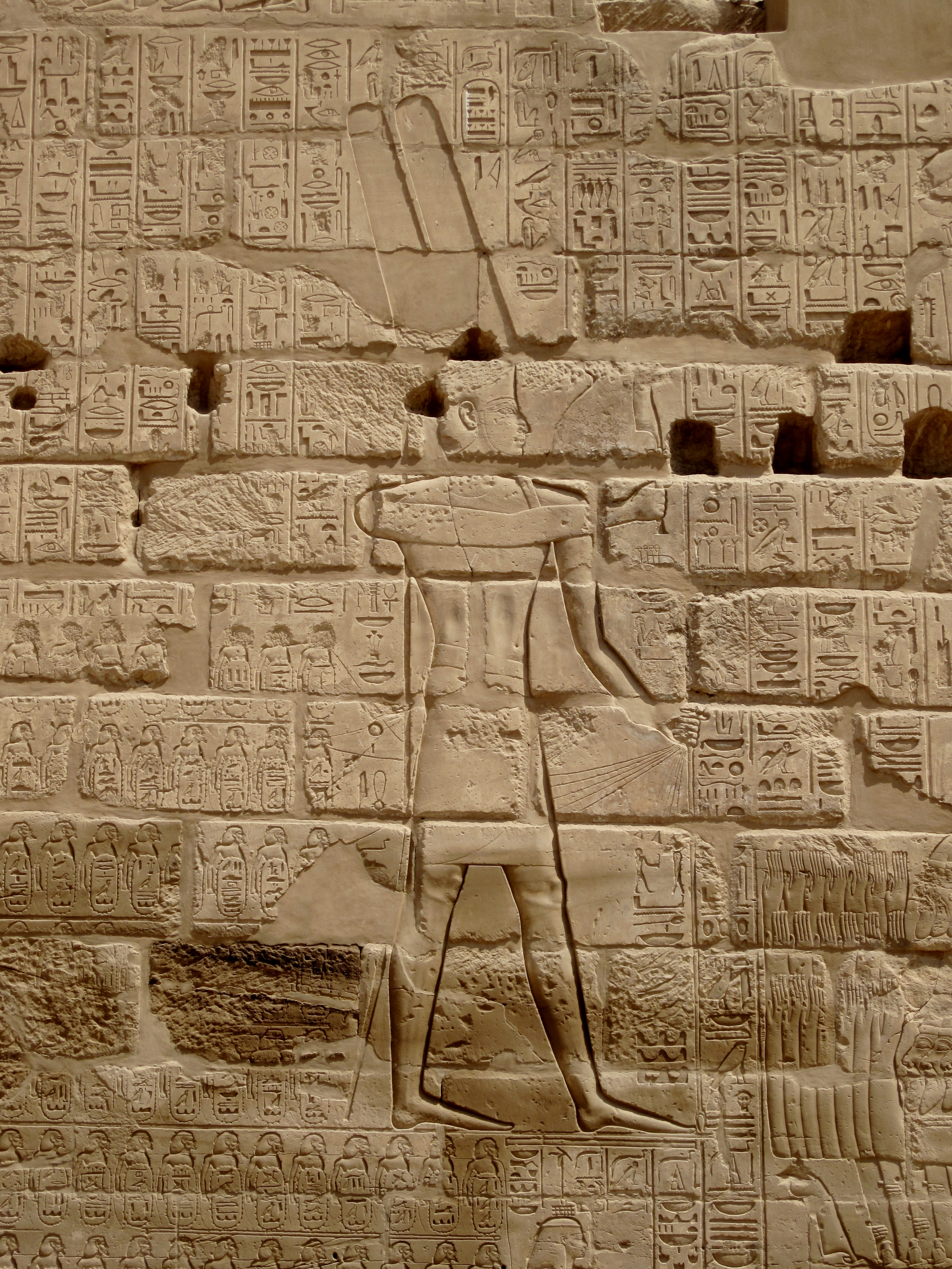
The Bubastite Portal at Karnak, with list of cities in Syria, Phoenicia, Israel, and Philistia conquered by the Pharaoh Shoshenq I

=== Northeast Africa ===
Egyptian hieroglyphs from early dynasties testify to Libyans, who were the Berbers of Egypt's "western desert"; they are first mentioned directly as the "Tehenou" during the pre-dynastic reigns of Scorpion (c. 3050) and of Narmer (on an ivory cylinder). The Berbero-Libyans later are shown in a bas relief at the temple of Sahure, from the Fifth Dynasty (2487–2348). The Palermo Stone, also called the Libyan Stone, lists the earliest sovereigns of Egypt from the 31st century to the 24th century, i.e., the list includes: about fifty pre-dynastic rulers of Egypt, followed by the earliest pharaohs, those of the first five dynasties. Some conjecture that the fifty earlier rulers listed may be Libyan Berbers, from whom the pharaohs derived.

Much later, Ramses II (r.1279–1213) was known to employ Libyan contingents in his army. Tombs of the 13th century contain paintings of Libu leaders wearing fine robes, with ostrich feathers in their "dreadlocks", short pointed beards, and tattoos on their shoulders and arms.

G20 SA A wA A SA A T14 A1 Z2
Meshwesh (mšwš.w)
in hieroglyphs

Osorkon the Elder (Akheperre setepenamun), a Berber leader of the Meshwesh tribe, appears to be the first Libyan pharaoh. Several decades later his nephew Shoshenq I (r.945–924) became Pharaoh of Egypt, and founder of its Twenty-second Dynasty (945–715). In 926 Shoshenq (Shishak of the Bible) successfully campaigned to Jerusalem then under Solomon's heir. The Phoenicians (particularly the people of the city-state of Tyre, who would later found Carthage during Egypt's Meshwesh dynasty), first came to know of the Berber people through these Libyan pharaohs.

For several centuries Egypt was governed by a decentralized political system loosely based on the Libyan tribal organization of the Meshwesh. Becoming acculturated, much of the evidence shows these Berbero-Libyans through an Egyptian lens. Eventually the Libyans served as high priests at centers of Egyptian religion. Hence during the classical era of the Mediterranean, all of the Berber peoples of North Africa were often collectively called Libyans, due to the fame first won by the Meshwesh dynasty of Egypt.

=== Northwest Africa ===
West of the Meshwesh dynasty of Egypt, later reports of foreigners mention more rustic Berber people by the Mediterranean, living in fertile and accessible coastal regions. Those located in or near Tunisia were known as Numidians; farther to the west, the Berbers were called the Mauri or Maurisi (later the Moors); and, in more remote mountains and deserts to the southwest were Berbers called Gaetulians. Another group of Berbers in the steppe and desert to the southeast of Carthage were known as the Garamantes.

During the 5th century BCE, the Greek writer Herodotus (c.490–425) mentions Berbers as mercenaries of Carthage with regard to specific military events in Sicily, circa 480. Thereafter the Berbers more frequently enter into the early light of history provided by various Greek and Roman historians. Apart from the Punic inscriptions, little Carthaginian literature has survived. We do know that Mago of Carthage began to employ Berbers as mercenaries in the sixth century.

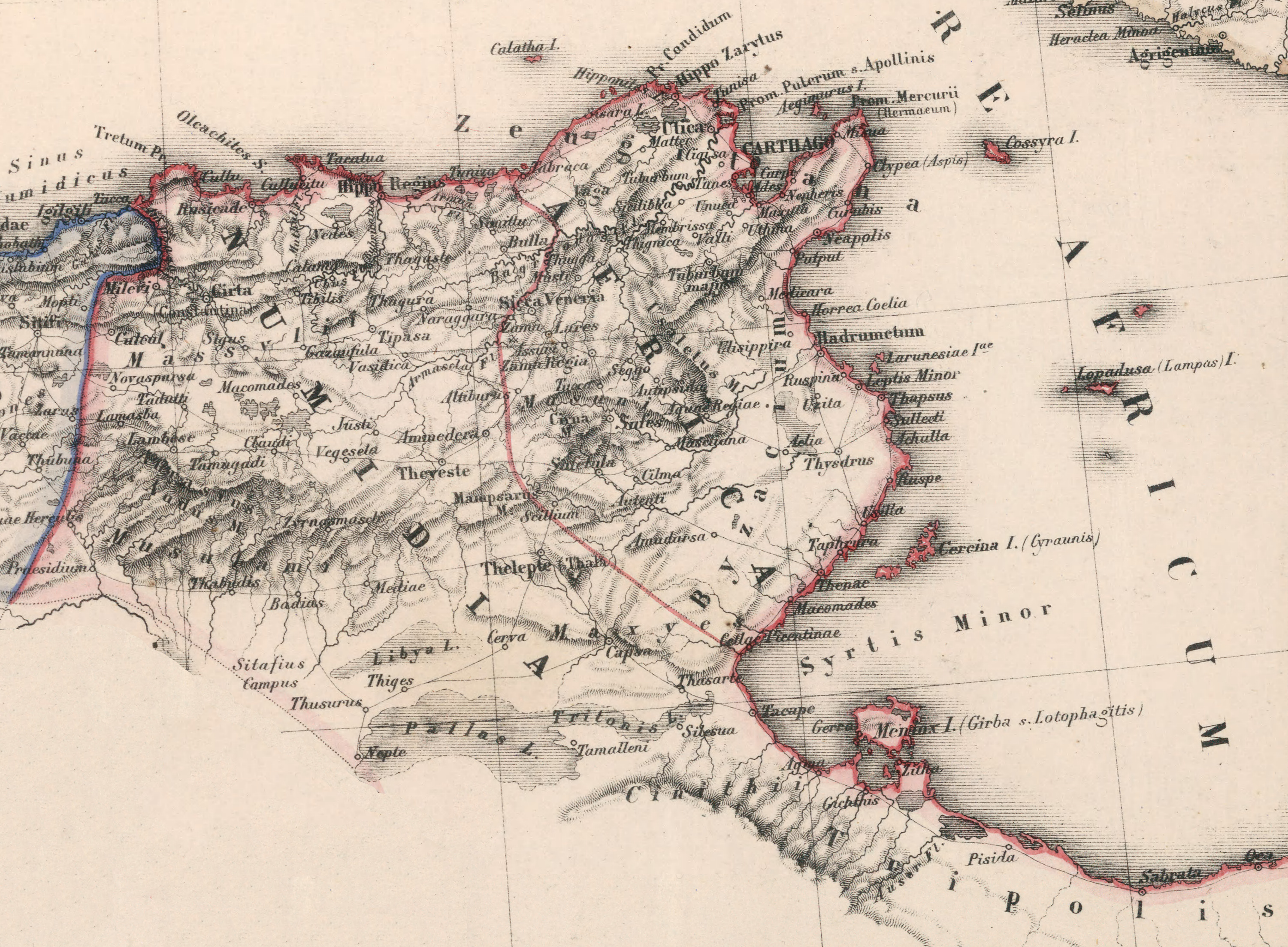
Numidia (Massyli and east Masaesyli)

During these centuries, Berbers of the western regions actively traded and intermingled with Phoenicians, who founded Carthage and its many trading stations. The name 'Libyphoenician' was then coined for the cultural and ethnic mix surrounding Punic settlements, particularly Carthage. Political skills and civic arrangements encountered in Carthage, as well as material culture, such as farming techniques, were adopted by the Berbers for their own use. In the 4th century, Berber kingdoms are referenced, e.g., the ancient historian Diodorus Siculus evidently mentions the Libyo-Berber king Aelymas, a neighbor to the south of Carthage, who dealt with the invader Agathocles (361–289), a Greek ruler from Sicily. Berbers here operated independently of Carthage.

Circa 220 BCE, three large kingdoms had arisen among the Berbers. These Berbers, independent yet markedly influenced by Punic civilization, had nonetheless endured the long ascendancy of Carthage. West to east the kingdoms were: (1) Mauretania (in modern Morocco) under the Mauri king Baga; (2) the Masaesyli (in north Algeria) under their king Syphax who then ruled from two capitals, in the west Siga (near modern Oran) and in the east Cirta (modern Constantine); and (3) the Massyli (south of Cirta, directly west and south of nearby Carthage) ruled by king Gala [Gaia], father of Masinissa. Following the Second Punic War, Massyli and eastern Masaesyli were joined to form Numidia, located in historic Tunisia. Both Roman and Hellenic states gave its famous ruler, Masinissa, honors befitting esteemed royalty.

== Ancient Berber religion ==
Evidence of ancient Berber religion and sacred practices provide some views, however incomplete, of the interior life of the people, otherwise largely opaque, and thus also clues as to the character of the Berbers, who witnessed the founding of Carthage.

=== Respect for the dead ===
The religion of the ancient Berbers, of course, is difficult to uncover sufficiently to satisfy the imagination. Burial sites provide early indication of religious beliefs; more than sixty thousand tombs are located in the Fezzan alone. The construction of many tombs indicates their continuing use for ceremonies and sacrifices. A grand tomb for a Berber king, traditionally assigned to Masinissa (238–149) but perhaps rather to his father Gala, still stands: the Medracen in eastern Algeria. Architecture for the elegant tower tomb of his contemporary Syphax shows some Greek or Punic influence. Much information about Berber beliefs comes from classical literature. Herodotus (c. 484 – c. 425) mentions that Libyans of the Nasamone tribe, after prayers, slept on the graves of their ancestors in order to induce dreams for divination. The ancestor chosen being regarded the best in life for uprightness and valor, hence a tomb imbued with spiritual power. Oaths also were taken on the graves of the just. In this regard, the Numidian king Masinissa was widely worshipped after his death.

=== Reverence for nature ===
Early Berbers beliefs and practices are often characterized as a religion of nature. Procreative power was symbolized by the bull, the lion, the ram. Fish carvings represented the phallus, a sea shell the female sex, which objects could become charms. The supernatural could reside in the waters, in trees, or come to rest in unusual stones (to which the Berbers would apply oils); such power might inhabit the winds (the Sirocco being formidable across North Africa). Herodotus writes that the Libyans sacrificed to the sun and moon. The moon (Ayyur) was conceived as being masculine.

Later many other supernatural entities became identified and personalized as gods, perhaps influenced by Egyptian or Punic practice; yet the Berbers seemed to be "drawn more to the sacred than to the gods." Early worship sites might be in grottoes, on mountains, in clefts and cavities, along roadways, with the "altars casually made of turf, the vessels used still of clay with the deity himself nowhere", according to the Berber author Apuleius (born c. 125 CE), commenting on the local worship of earlier times. Often only a little more than the names of the Berber deities are known, e.g., Bonchar, a leading god. Julian Baldick, culling literature covering many eras and regions, provides the names and rôles of many Berber deities and spirits.

=== Syncretic developments ===
The Berbero-Libyans came to adopt elements from ancient Egyptian religion. Herodotus writes of the divine oracle, sourced in the Egyptian god Ammon, located among the Libyans at the oasis of Siwa. This Libyan oasis of Ammon functioned a sister oracle to one at Dodona in Greece, according to Herodotus (c.484-c.425). However, the god of the Siwa oracle, to the contrary, may be a Libyan deity. The visit of Alexander in 331 brought to the Siwa oracle wide notice in the ancient world.

Later, Berber beliefs would influence the Punic religion from Carthage, the city-state founded by Phoenicians. George Aaron Barton suggested that the prominent goddess of Carthage Tanit originally was a Berbero-Libyan deity whom the newly arriving Phoenicians sought to propitiate by their worship. Later archeological finds show a Tanit from Phoenicia. From linguistic evidence Barton concluded that before developing into an agricultural deity, Tanit probably began as a goddess of fertility, symbolized by a tree bearing fruit. The Phoenician goddess Ashtart was supplanted by Tanit at Carthage.

== See also ==
- Ancient Libya
- Shoshenq I
- Capsian
- Berber languages
- Afroasiatic languages
- Phoenicia
- Massylii
- Numidia
- Carthage
- Tanit
- History of Roman era Tunisia
- History of early Islamic Tunisia
