= Maria Ludwika Bernhard =

Polish classical archaeologist and Greek Art specialist

- Born: August 6, 1908; Loedz, Poland
- Died: 1998 (aged 89–90)
- Education: French School at Athens; Warsaw University
- Known for: History of Ancient Greek Art
- Scientific career
- Fields: classical archaeology, Greek Art,
- Workplaces: Warsaw University; National Museum in Warsaw; Jagiellonian University

Maria Ludwika Bernhard (August 6, 1908 – 1998) was a Polish classical archaeologist and a specialist in Greek Art. During the German Occupation of Poland in World War II, Bernhard was living in Warsaw and was active in the Polish Resistance Movement. After the war, Bernhard was a Professor of Classical Archaeology at the University of Warsaw. In 1957 she became the chair of the Department of Classical Archaeology at Jagiellonian University. She was also curator of the Ancient Art gallery at the National Museum in Warsaw from 1945 to 1962.

== Early life and education ==
Bernhard studied art history and classical archaeology at the French School at Athens from 1937 – 1938. She went on to obtain a PhD from Warsaw University in 1939, studying under Kazimierz Michałowski. Bernard was hired as Professor Michalowski's university assistant in 1934. In 1938, Bernhard was given the responsibility of organizing the Ancient Art Gallery at the National Museum of Warsaw. She would eventually go on to become the head of the Art Gallery.

== World War II and the Polish resistance ==
The outbreak of war in Europe in 1939 brought Bernhard's career to a sudden halt. During the German Occupation of Poland, Bernhard was living in Warsaw and was active in the Polish resistance movement in World War II. She was a liaison officer of the Home Army and later she managed the VK Communications Department of the Warsaw Area Command ZWZ-AK. She continued to work at the museum during the war, where she safeguarded the art collections. In June 1940, Bernhard was arrested and sent to Pawiak, a German Gestapo prison.

== Career after World War II ==
After she was released from prison at the end of the war, Bernhard worked as a Professor of Classical Archaeology at the University of Warsaw. At the same time, she worked as curator of the Ancient Art department at the National Museum in Warsaw. She was curator at the museum until 1962. In 1954, she was promoted to the chair of Classical Archaeology department at Jagiellonian University in Kraków. She taught classes at the University until her retirement in 1978.

Bernhard participated in excavations at Tell Edfu in Egypt in 1954 and in the Crimea 1956 - 1958. She supervised an expedition at Palmyra in 1967.

Bernhard is primarily known for the Polish publication of four volumes of the History of Ancient Greek Art, and for seven volumes of the Corpus Vasorum Antiquorum: a scholarly discussion of the art collections at the National Museum in Warsaw.
