= Dikili Tash =

Prehistoric settlement in Greece

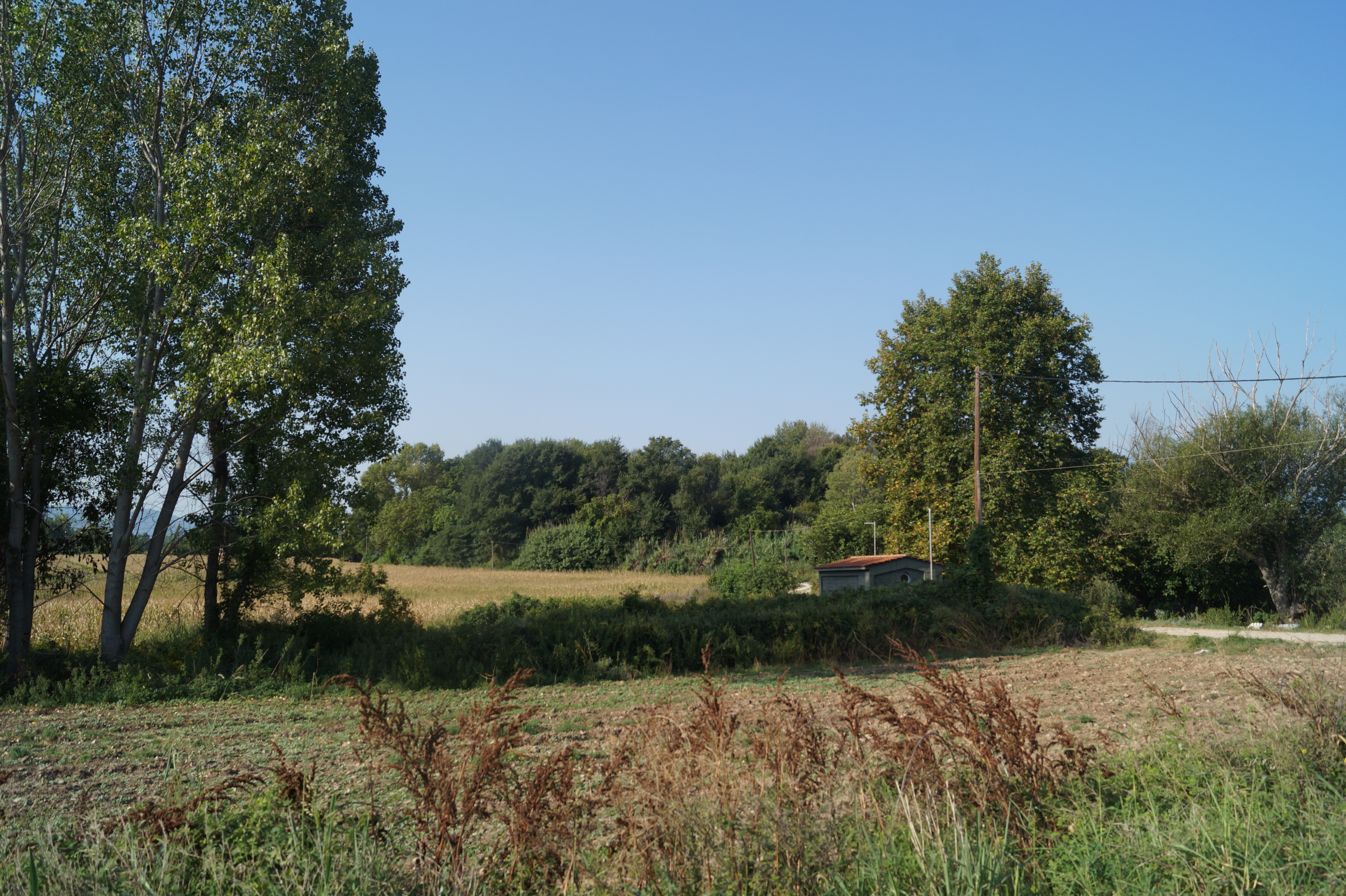
Dikili Tash, as viewed from the stele of C. Vibius Quartus

Dikili Tash (also known as Dikilitaş) is a prehistoric tell settlement rising 16 m above the Drama plain in Eastern Macedonia, c. 1.5 km east of ancient Philippi. It is about 4.5 hectares.

The tell is a major Neolithic and Bronze Age site (c. 6400/6200-1100 BC), known since the 19th century, and excavated by the French School at Athens and the Archaeological Society of Athens. Among the notable discoveries are timber-framed buildings of the Late Neolithic period. One of these was decorated with a bull's skull plastered over with clay in the manner seen in the building model from the contemporary site of Promachonas on the Greek-Bulgarian frontier.

== Name ==
The name Dikili Taş means "upright stone" in Turkish; it is also called by the Greek name Ορθόπετρα (Orthopetra), which means the same. This refers to the inscribed funerary altar of Gaius Vibius Quartus, a military officer from the Roman colony of Philippi who was buried in the cemetery beside the Via Egnatia, which passes the foot of the tell.

== History ==
=== Late Neolithic I ===
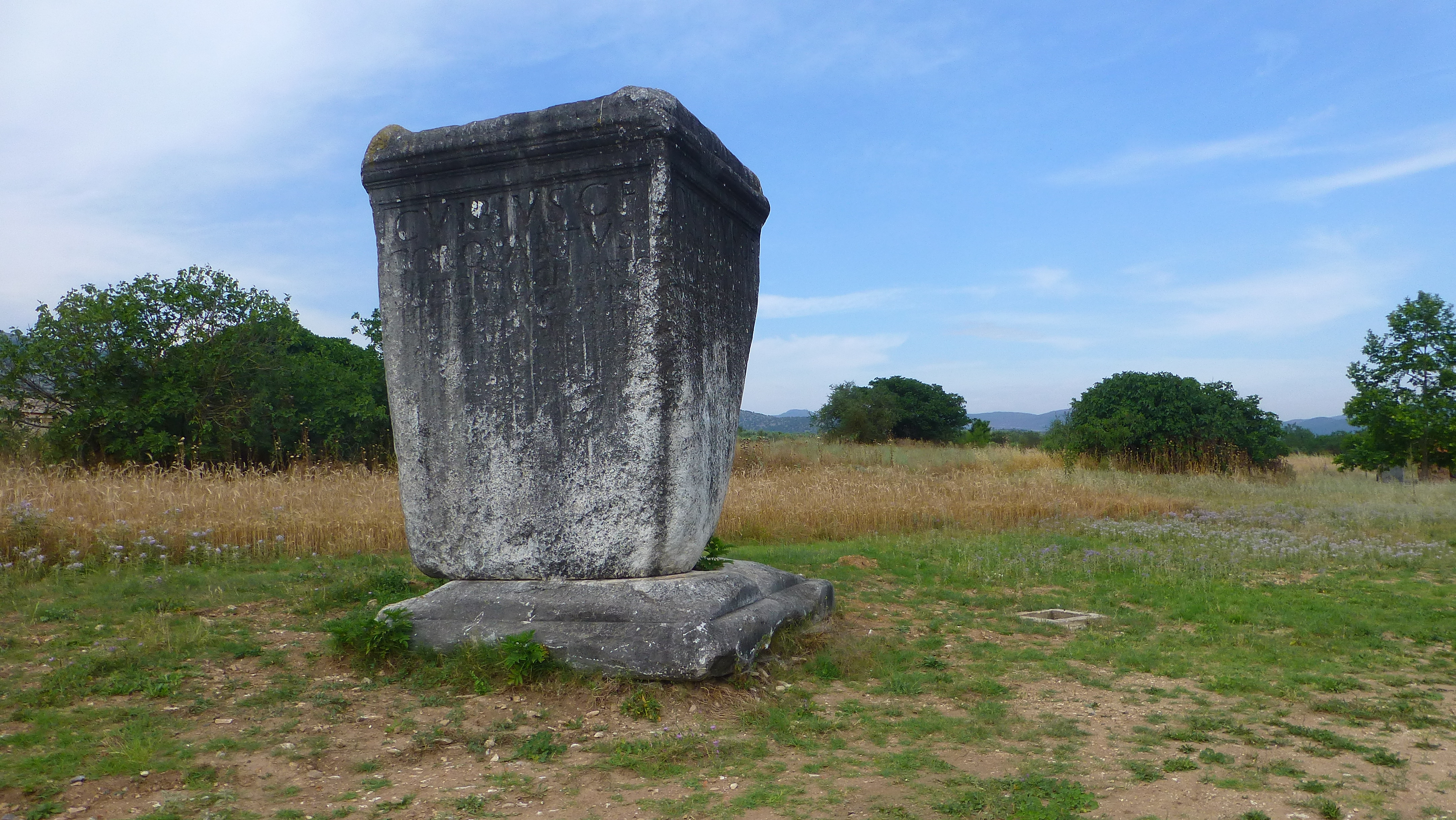
Funerary altar of C. Vibius Quartus

=== Late Neolithic II (Chalcolithic) ===
The Late Neolithic II is represented by Phase Dikili Tash II. Radiocarbon dates fell into the period between 5400 and 3800 cal BC. The start of LN II has been set to around 4800 BC as dates for the last LN I has clustered doen to 4900 BC. There also seem to be a short gap between LN I and LN II.

It ended with a destruction layer.

=== Early Bronze ===
The EBA occupation started around 3300-2900 BC. A long sequence of Early Bronze levels have been uncovered. Pottery has been divided into two sub-phases (Dikili Tash phases IIIA and IIIB), corresponding to phases IV and V of neighbouring Sitagroi. It represents the EB I (Pre-Troy I) and EB II (Troy I) periods.
