= Roland Étienne =

French archaeologist and historian (born 1944)

- Born: 18 April 1944 (age 82)
- Education: École normale supérieure
- Occupations: Archaeologist, historian

Roland Étienne (born 18 April 1944) is a French archaeologist and historian specialising in the history of Greek archaeology, ancient architecture and Hellenistic history.

== Career ==
A graduate of the École normale supérieure (1964–1969), Étienne taught ancient history in the Universities of Nanterre and Montpellier and conducted archaeological research in Greece (Cyclades) and Turkey.

He has lived five years in Greece with Françoise Étienne, from 1972 to 1976. Both have participated in excavations during this period. Together they authored La Grèce antique : Archéologie d'une découverte (collection "Découvertes Gallimard", 1990; English edition: The Search for Ancient Greece).

Professor of archaeology at Lumière University Lyon 2, he is the author of a dissertation on Tinos published in the collection Bibliothèque des Écoles françaises d'Athènes et de Rome (1990).

In 1992, Étienne was appointed director of the French School at Athens. Since leaving the capital of Greece, he has been a professor of classical archaeology at Pantheon-Sorbonne University, and director of the team Mondes grecs archaïques et classiques, which belongs to the Archéologies et Sciences de l'Antiquité at Nanterre University.

== Publications ==
- with Marcel Piérart, Un décret du koinon des Hellènes à Platées en l'honneur de Glaucon, fils d'Étéoclès, d'Athènes, in Bulletin de correspondance hellénique (BCH), 1975, tome 99, No. 1, pp. 51–75
- under the direction of Roland Étienne, « Hyettos de Béotie et chronologie des archontes fédéraux entre 250 et 171 avant J.-C. », in Bulletin de correspondance hellénique (BCH), 1976, Supplément 3
- with Denis Knoepfler, Hyettos de Béotie et la chronologie des archontes fédéraux entre 250 et 171 avant J.-C. with an appendix by John Fossey, Éditions de Boccard (collection Bulletin de laCorrespondance Hellénique supplément III), Paris, 1976 compte-rendu de Marcel Piérart, in L'Antiquité Classique, 1978, tome 47, No. 2, pp. 684–686
- Inscriptions de Délos, in Bulletin de Correspondance Hellénique (BCH), 1981, tome 105, No. 1, pp. 171–182
- with Jean-Pierre Braun, Ténos I. Le Sanctuaire de Poseidon et d'Amphitrite, 3 volumes, Éditions De Boccard (collection Bibliothèques des Écoles Françaises d'Athènes et de Rome, fascicule 263), Paris, 1986 (compte-rendu de Jean Marcadé, dans Revue des Études Anciennes, 1988, tome 90, No. 3-4, pp. 453–456
- with Philippe Fraisse, L'autel archaïque de l'Artémision de Délos, in Bulletin de Correspondance Hellénique (BCH), 1989, tome 113, No. 2, pp. 451–466
- Ténos II. Ténos et les Cyclades du milieu du IVe siècle avant J.-C. au milieu du IIIe siècle après J.-C., Éditions De Boccard (collection Bibliothèques des Écoles Françaises d'Athènes et de Rome, fascicule 263bis), Paris, 1990, ISBN 2-86958-026-6 ; 293p. (compte-rendu Michel Amandry, dans Revue Numismatique, 1992, tome 34, pp. 256–258
- L'oracle d'Apollon à Claros Une consultation à Claros en 18 av. J.C., in Publications de l'Institut Français d'Études Anatoliennes, 1990, No. 4, pp. 36–39

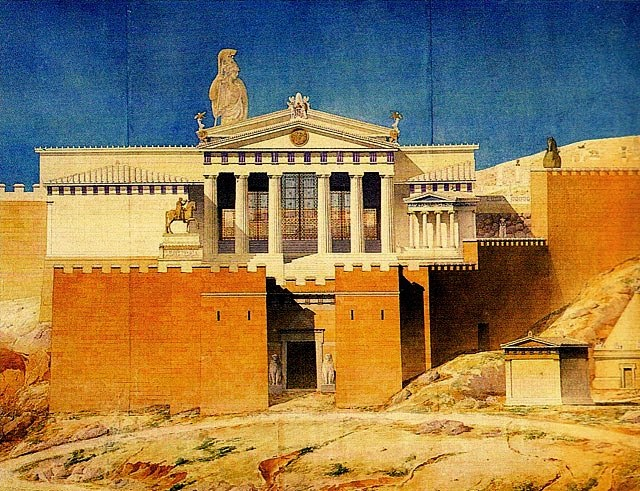
"Restored west façade of the Propylaea of the Acropolis" (1864) by Louis Boitte, featured on the cover of La Grèce antique : Archéologie d'une découverte.

- with Françoise Étienne, La Grèce antique : Archéologie d'une découverte, collection « Découvertes Gallimard » (nº 84), série Archéologie. Gallimard, Paris, 1990, ISBN 978-2-07-053043-4 ; 176pp.
  - UK edition – The Search for Ancient Greece, ‘New Horizons’ series. Thames & Hudson, 1992
  - US edition – The Search for Ancient Greece, "Abrams Discoveries" series. Harry N. Abrams, 1992
- with Jean-Pierre Braun, L'autel monumental du théâtre à Délos, dans Bulletin de Correspondance Hellénique (BCH), 1995, tome 119, No. 1, pp. 63–87
- L'École française d'Athènes, 1846-1996, dans Bulletin de Correspondance Hellénique (BCH), 1996, No. 120-1, pp. 3–22
- L'espace grec. 150 ans de fouilles de l'école française d'Athènes, Fayard, Paris, 1996, ISBN 978-2213597096 ; 190pp.
- Le Prytanée de Délos, dans Revue des Études Anciennes, 1997, tome 99, No. 3-4, pp. 305–324
- Athènes, espaces urbains et histoire. Des origines à la fin du IIIe siècle après J.-C., Hachette (collection Carré Histoire), Paris, 2004, ISBN 978-2-01-145571-0 ; 255pp.
- with Pierre Varène, Sanctuaire de Claros. Les propylées et les monuments de la voie sacrée. Douilles de Louis et Jeanne Robert et Roland Martin, 1950-1961, 2006 ISBN 978-2865382965 ; 279pp.
- with Cristel Müller et Francis Prost, Archéologie historique de la Grèce Antique, Ellipses, Paris, 2006, ISBN 978-2729828288 ; 399pp.
- Le Sanctuaire d’Apollon, in Bulletin de Correspondance Hellénique (BCH), 2009, tome 133, No. 2, pp. 609–623
- with Jean-François Salles, « Iraq al-Amīr. Guide historique et archéologique du domaine des Tobiades », Presses de l'Institut français du Proche Orient, 2010, ISBN 978-2-35159-165-9
- Η ΑΡΧΑΙΑ ΤΗΝΟΣ (I archaia Tinos), Centre Culturel de Tinos, 2014, ISBN 978-9609915946 ; 184pp.
