= Michel Debidour =

French historian and archaeologist

- Father: Victor-Henry Debidour

Academic background
- Education: École Normale Supérieure

Academic work
- Discipline: history and archaeology
- Institutions: Jean Moulin University Lyon 3
- Main interests: history and economy of Greek cities; history of technology and cryptography

Michel Debidour (born 1947) is a French historian and archaeologist.

== Biography ==
The son of hellenist Victor-Henry Debidour, he joined the École Normale Supérieure in 1966, obtained his Agrégation de Lettres Classiques in 1970 and was a member of the French School at Athens from 1972 to 1977.

His research focuses on the history and economy of Greek cities, the history of technology and cryptography; he is a specialist of the amphora stamps of Thasos.

== Selected bibliography ==
- Les Timbres amphoriques thasiens de type récent : méthodologie et interprétation, Lyon, 1999, 4 vol., 1101 p.
- Les Grecs et la Guerre : de la guerre rituelle à la guerre totale, 217 p., Éditions du Rocher, 2002
- Économies et sociétés dans la Grèce égéenne (dir.), Éditions du Temps, 2007 ISBN 9782842744168
- « Lucien et les trois romans de l’Âne », Lucien de Samosate (Lyon-Paris, 1994), (p. 55–63)
- « Les Grecs et la montagne », Bulletin de l’Association des Géographes français, 2003–1, (p. 95–103)
- « Les villes englouties dans le monde grec jusqu’au Moyen Age : réalités et interprétations », La météorologie dans l’Antiquité entre science et croyance, Saint-Étienne, 2003, (p. 35–47)
- « Les Lagides et les Séleucides à l’époque des guerres de Syrie : l’exemple de l’expédition de Ptolémée III (245 av. J.-C.) », L’Orient méditerranéen de la mort d’Alexandre au Ier siècle avant notre ère (M.-Th. Le Dinahet, éd.), 2003, (p. 46–64)
- « Les oiseaux dans les Oiseaux d’Aristophane », Les oiseaux : de la réalité à l’imaginaire (Cl. Lachet et G. Lavorel éd.), Cedic, 2006, (p. 11–24)
- « Le secret et les messages secrets dans la Poliorcétique d’Enée le Tacticien », Ruses, Secrets et Mensonges chez les historiens grecs et latins (H. Olivier, P. Giovannelli-Jouanna Fr. Bérard éd.), Lyon-Paris, 2006, (p. 213–241)
- « Prévenir l’ami, exclure l’ennemi : le secret de l’information à Rome, de Polybe au Bas-Empire », Parole, media et pouvoir à l’époque romaine en l’honneur du professeur Guy Achard (M. Ledentu éd.), Lyon-Paris, 2007, (p. 465–501)
- "Analyser le témoignage des monnaies grecques: l'exemple des monnaies à la couronne au IIe s. av. J.-C.", Économies et sociétés dans la Grèce égéenne (478-88 av. J.-C.) (M. Debidour éd.), Paris, 2007, (p. 37–62)
- « Entremetteurs et entremetteuses dans les Mimes d’Hérondas », in Entremetteurs et entremetteuses dans la littérature de l’Antiquité à nos jours (C. Pierreville, éd.), Cedic, 2007, (p. 21–34)
- « Le problème de l’eau dans une cité de Numidie : l’inscription hydraulique de Lamasba », in Urbanisme et urbanisation en Numidie militaire (A. Groslambert éd.), Lyon-Paris, 2009, (p. 153–180)
