= Gilbert Charles-Picard =

- Born: 15 October 1913; Nercillac, France
- Died: 21 December 1998 (aged 85); Versailles, France
- Occupation: Historian
- Spouse: Colette Picard
- Children: Olivier Picard

Gilbert Charles-Picard, also known as Gilbert Picard (15 October 1913 – 21 December 1998) was a 20th-century French historian and archaeologist, a specialist of North Africa during Antiquity.

The son of Hellenist Charles Picard (1883–1965), he was born at Nercillac. He was married to Colette Picard, also an historian of antiquity and curator of the site of Carthage, and was the father of Olivier Picard, also an Hellenist, former director of the French School at Athens and a member of the Institut de France.

He began his career in Algeria where he explored several sites, and also sojourned in Rome and Carthage. His sister, the philosopher Yvonne Picard, was a member of the French Resistance and died at Birkenau prison camp in 1943.

Gilbert Charles-Picard won the Prix Broquette-Gonin awarded by the Académie française in 1960 for his work La Civilisation de l'Afrique romaine.

He died in Versailles in 1998, aged 85.
