= Colette Picard =

French historian

- Born: Colette Durand; 30 October 1913; Paris, France
- Died: 11 October 1999 (aged 85); Versailles, France
- Occupations: Historian; Archaeologist
- Spouse: Gilbert Charles-Picard
- Children: Olivier Picard

Colette Picard (née Durand) (1913 – 11 October 1999, Versailles) was a French archaeologist and historian. As curator of the archaeological site of Carthage, she led excavations on the hill of Byrsa in 1947.

Married to historian Gilbert Charles-Picard, Colette Picard was the mother of Hellenist Olivier Picard, former director of the École française d'Athènes and a member of the Institut de France.

== Bibliography ==
- Catalogue du musée Alaoui
- 1951: Carthage, Paris
- 1958: La vie quotidienne à Carthage au temps ď'Hannibal, IIIe siècle avant Jésus-Christ [in collaboration with G. Charles-Picard]
