= Jean Marcadé =

French historian and hellenist (1920–2012)

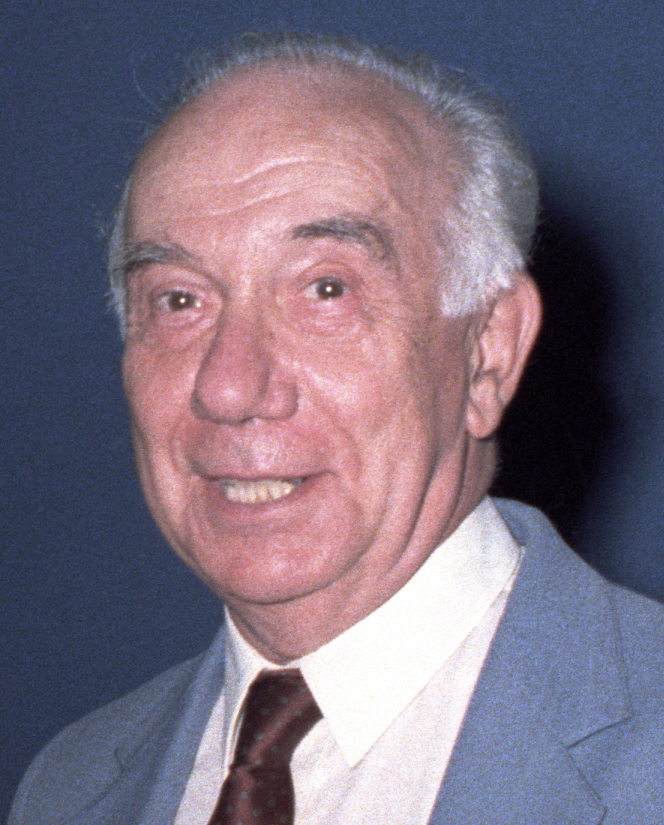
- Born: 27 April 1920; Libourne
- Died: 28 December 2012 (aged 92)
- Occupations: Historian; Hellenist

Jean Marcadé (27 April 1920 – 28 December 2012) was a French hellenist historian. He was a member of the Institut de France.

== Biography ==
A student at the École normale supérieure (1939), Jean Marcadé was agrégé of classical letters then became a member of the French School at Athens (1946–1950 and 1951–1953).

He began his career at the Faculty of Arts of the University of Bordeaux, where he was a lecturer and then, having defended his thesis in 1969, professor of classical archeology and history of antique art (1953–1978). He also headed a research center until 1989. From 1971, however, he led a seminar at the université Paris-1 Panthéon-Sorbonne, where he was finally elected a professor of classical archeology (1978).

He was elected a corresponding member of the Académie des inscriptions et belles-lettres in 1978 then full member on 25 February 1983 at Claude Schaeffer's seat and presided the Académie in 1994.
