= Edmond Lévy =

French classical historian (born 1934)

Edmond Lévy (born 1934) is a French classical historian.

== Biography ==
Originally a pupil of an École normale supérieure (promotion 1956), an aggregate of letters, he was also a pupil of École française d'Athènes, a school in Athens, Greece where the French language is taught to students who are mainly from France. He is a specialist in Greek history and is a retired professor at Marc-Bloch University in Strasbourg, France. He edits the Ktèma review.

== Works ==
- Athènes devant la défaite de 404. Histoire d'une crise idéologique, De Boccard, 1976
- La femme dans les sociétés antiques, University of Strasbourg, 1983
- Le système palatial en Orient, en Grèce et à Rome, De Boccard, 1987
- La Grèce au Ve siècle, de Clisthène à Socrate, Seuil, 1995
- La codification des lois dans l'Antiquité, De Boccard, 2000
- Sparte. Histoire politique et sociale jusqu'à la conquête romaine, Seuil, 2003
