= French School at Athens =

Archaeological institute operating in Athens, Greece

Coordinates: 37°58′56″N 23°44′16″E

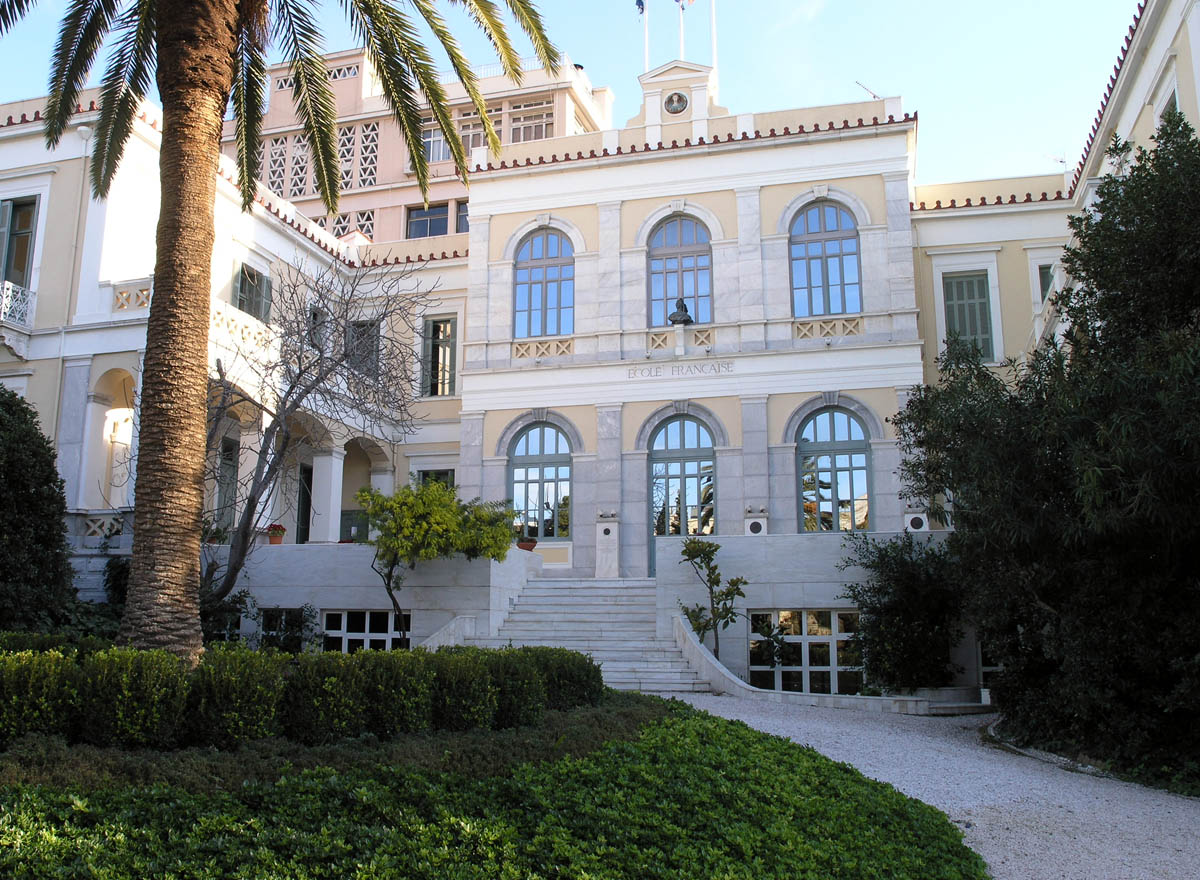
The facade of the EfA's main building.

The French School at Athens (French: École française d’Athènes, EfA; Greek: Γαλλική Σχολή Αθηνών Gallikí Scholí Athinón) is one of the seventeen foreign archaeological institutes operating in Athens, Greece.

== History ==
Founded in 1846, the EfA is the oldest foreign institute in Athens. Its early foundation, still a source of considerable prestige, is to be seen culturally connected with French philhellenism and politically with the French East Mediterranean strategy of the time.

== Facilities ==
It operates an active programme of research in all fields of Greek studies, but primarily in archaeology, epigraphy and Classical Studies. The EfA conducts an extensive programme of scholarships and bursaries. Its library holds 80,000 volumes, 550,000 photographs and 35,000 maps.

== Educational institution ==
Unlike most of the other foreign institutes, the EfA has a status more akin to a university graduate school than a simple research institute. Its formal status is referred to as an Établissement public à caractère scientifique, culturel et professionnel in the French education system. Some of its sought-after scholarships are renewable for periods up to four years, providing students with the opportunity to conduct most or all of their PhD research in Athens.

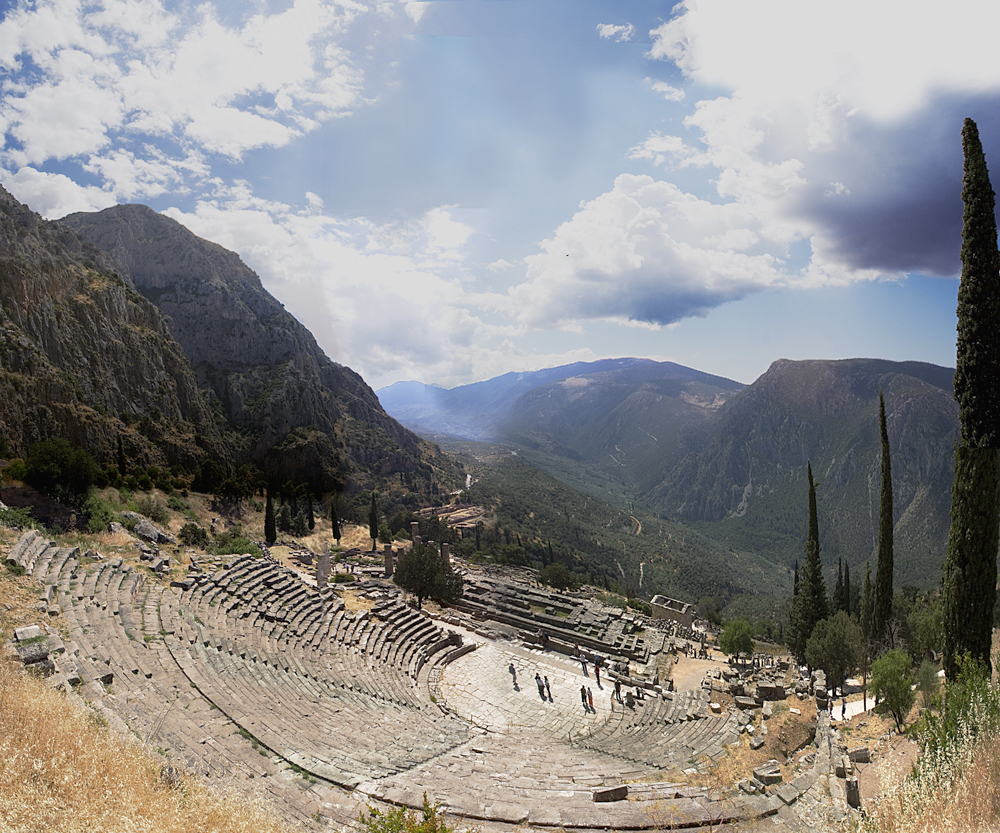
The French School has been active at the site of Delphi since the 19th century.

== Archaeological fieldwork ==
Since its foundation, the EFA has been involved in many important archaeological projects in Greece, including the excavations at Philippi, Dikili Tash (both in Greek Macedonia), the Samothrace temple complex and Thasos (in the North Aegean), Delphi (Central Greece), Argos (Peloponnese), Delos (Cyclades), Malia and Itanos (Crete), as well as Amathus in Cyprus.

== Directors ==
- Amédée Daveluy 1846-1867
- Émile-Louis Burnouf 1867-1875
- Albert Dumont 1875-1878
- Paul Foucart 1878-1890
- Théophile Homolle 1890-1903
- Maurice Holleaux 1903-1912
- Gustave Fougères 1913-1919
- Charles Picard 1919-1925
- Pierre Roussel 1925-1935
- Robert Demangel 1936-1950
- Georges Daux 1950-1969
- Pierre Amandry 1969-1981
- Olivier Picard 1981-1992
- Roland Étienne 1992-2001
- Dominique Mulliez 2002-2011
- Alexandre Farnoux 2011-2019
- Véronique Chankowski 2019-2023

== Notable alumni ==
Many important archaeologists, classicists and epigraphers from France and elsewhere throughout a century and a half have been members of the EfA:

- Alexandre Bertrand (1849)
- Edmond About (1851)
- Numa-Denis Fustel de Coulanges (1853)
- Léon Heuzey (1854)
- Paul Vidal de la Blache (1867)
- Charles Diehl (1883)
- Victor Bérard (1887)
- Georges Daux (1920)
- André Plassart (1922)
- Louis Robert (1927)
- Paul Lemerle (1931)
- Ernest Will (1935)
- Jean Bousquet (1936)
- Maria Ludwika Bernhard (1938)
- Roland Martin (1938)
- Jean Pouilloux (1945)
- Jean Marcadé (1946)
- Pierre Lévêque (1947)
- Jean Bingen (1952)
- Edmond Lévy (1963)
- Michel Debidour (1972)
- Jean-Yves Empereur (1978)
