= Charles Picard =

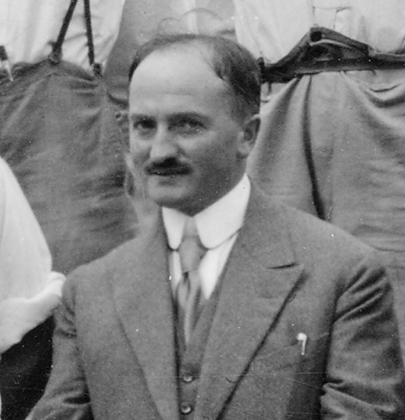
Charles Picard in 1922

Charles Picard (7 June 1883 – 15 December 1965) was a prominent Classical archaeologist and historian of ancient Greek art. He is best known for his multi-volume, monumental survey, Manuel d'archéologie grecque: La sculpture. Volume I (7-6th centuries BCE), was published in 1935. He completed the second fascicule of Volume IV (4th century BCE) in 1963. Picard was elected member of the Académie des inscriptions et belles-lettres in 1932.

His children were the historian Gilbert Charles-Picard and Yvonne Picard, a member of the French Resistance, who was murdered at Auschwitz concentration camp in 1943.

== Sources ==
- Raymond Lebègue, Éloge funèbre de M. Charles Picard, membre de l'Académie, Comptes rendus des séances de l'Académie des Inscriptions et Belles-Lettres, 110e année, No 1, 1966 (pp. 1–6) (online edition)
- Ève Gran-Aymerich, Les chercheurs de passé, Editions du CNRS, 2007 (pp. 1058–1059)
