= Hamilcar's defeat of Spendius and Autaritus =

240 BC battle during the Mercenary War

- Part of the Mercenary War
Date	240 BC
Location	Unknown location in northern Tunisia
Result	Carthaginian victory

Belligerents
Carthage	Rebels

Commanders and leaders
Hamilcar Barca; Naravas	Spendius; Autaritus

Strength
12,000–17,000	18,000–23,000

Casualties and losses
Unknown	Up to: 10,000 killed 4,000 captured

In 240 BC in what is now north-west Tunisia, a Carthaginian army led by Hamilcar Barca defeated a rebel army led by Spendius and Autaritus, after 2,000 Numidian cavalry led by Naravas defected from the rebels to Carthage. The precise location of the battle is unknown. Carthage was fighting a coalition of mutinous soldiers and rebellious African cities in the Mercenary War which had started in 241 BC.

Hamilcar's army had manoeuvred to bring rebel-controlled towns back to Carthage while a rebel army under the command of Spendius, which included a contingent of Gauls under Autaritus and a group of Numidian cavalry under Naravas, shadowed it. Unable to confront the Carthaginian war elephants and cavalry on open ground, the rebels stayed on higher and rougher terrain and harassed the Carthaginian army. The Carthaginians became trapped in a mountain valley and their situation was bleak. Naravas defected to Carthage, bringing his 2,000 cavalry with him. Hamilcar, with his route of retreat now clear, deployed for battle. Spendius chose to engage and in a hard-fought battle was heavily defeated.

Spendius perceived Hamilcar's generous treatment of rebel prisoners as the motivation behind Naravas's defection and feared the disintegration of his army. To remove the possibility of any goodwill between the sides, he had 700 Carthaginian prisoners tortured to death. The Carthaginians, in turn, killed their prisoners. From this point, neither side showed any mercy, and the unusual ferocity of the fighting caused the contemporary historian Polybius to term it the "Truceless War". The rebel army was finally defeated in 238 BC, with the last rebel city surrendering in 237 BC.

== Background ==
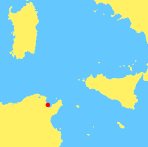
The location of Carthage

The First Punic War was fought between Carthage and Rome, the two main powers of the western Mediterranean in the 3rd century BC, and lasted for 23 years, from 264 to 241 BC. The two powers struggled for supremacy primarily on the Mediterranean island of Sicily and its surrounding waters, and also in North Africa. While the war with Rome was being fought on Sicily, the Carthaginian general Hanno led a series of campaigns which greatly increased the area of Africa controlled by Carthage. He extended its control to Theveste (modern Tébessa, in Algeria) 300 km (190 mi) south west of their capital. Hanno was rigorous in squeezing taxes out of the newly conquered territory to pay for both the war with Rome and his own campaigns. Half of all agricultural output was taken as war tax, and the tribute due from all towns and cities was doubled. These exactions were harshly enforced, causing extreme hardship in many areas.

After immense material and human losses on both sides during the First Punic War, the Carthaginians were defeated. The Carthaginian Senate ordered the commander of its forces on Sicily, Hamilcar Barca, to negotiate a peace treaty on whatever terms he could; convinced the surrender was unnecessary he left Sicily in a rage, delegating negotiations to his deputy Gisco. The Treaty of Lutatius was agreed and brought the First Punic War to an end.

=== Mutiny ===
The post-war evacuation of the Carthaginian army of 20,000 men from Sicily was left in the hands of Gisco. He split the army into small detachments based on their regions of origin and sent these back to Carthage one at a time. He anticipated they would be promptly paid the several years' back pay they were owed and hurried on their way home. The Carthaginian authorities decided instead to wait until all the troops had arrived and then attempt to negotiate a settlement at a lower rate. They despatched the returning troops to Sicca Veneria (modern El Kef), 180 km (110 mi) away.

Freed from their long period of military discipline and with nothing to do, the men grumbled among themselves and refused all attempts by the Carthaginians to pay them less than the full amount due. Frustrated by the Carthaginian negotiators' attempts to haggle, all 20,000 troops marched to Tunis, 16 km (10 mi) from Carthage. Panicking, the Senate agreed to payment in full. The mutinous troops responded by demanding even more. Gisco, who had a good reputation with the army, was brought over from Sicily in late 241 BC and despatched to the camp with enough money to pay most of what was owed. He started to disburse this, with promises that the balance would be paid as soon as it could be raised, when discipline broke down. Several soldiers insisted no deal with Carthage was acceptable, a riot broke out, men who stayed loyal to Carthage were stoned to death, Gisco and his staff were taken prisoner, and his treasury was seized.

The rebels declared Spendius, an escaped Roman slave who faced death by torture if he were recaptured, and Mathos, a Berber dissatisfied with Hanno's attitude towards tax raising from Carthage's African possessions, their generals. The news of a formed, experienced, anti-Carthaginian army in the heart of its territory spread rapidly and many cities and towns rose in rebellion. Provisions, money and reinforcements poured in; eventually another 70,000 men according to the ancient Roman historian Polybius, although many would have been tied down in garrisoning their home towns against Carthaginian retribution. The pay dispute had become a full-scale revolt. The three years of war that followed are known as the Mercenary War and threatened Carthage's existence as a state.

=== Opposing armies ===
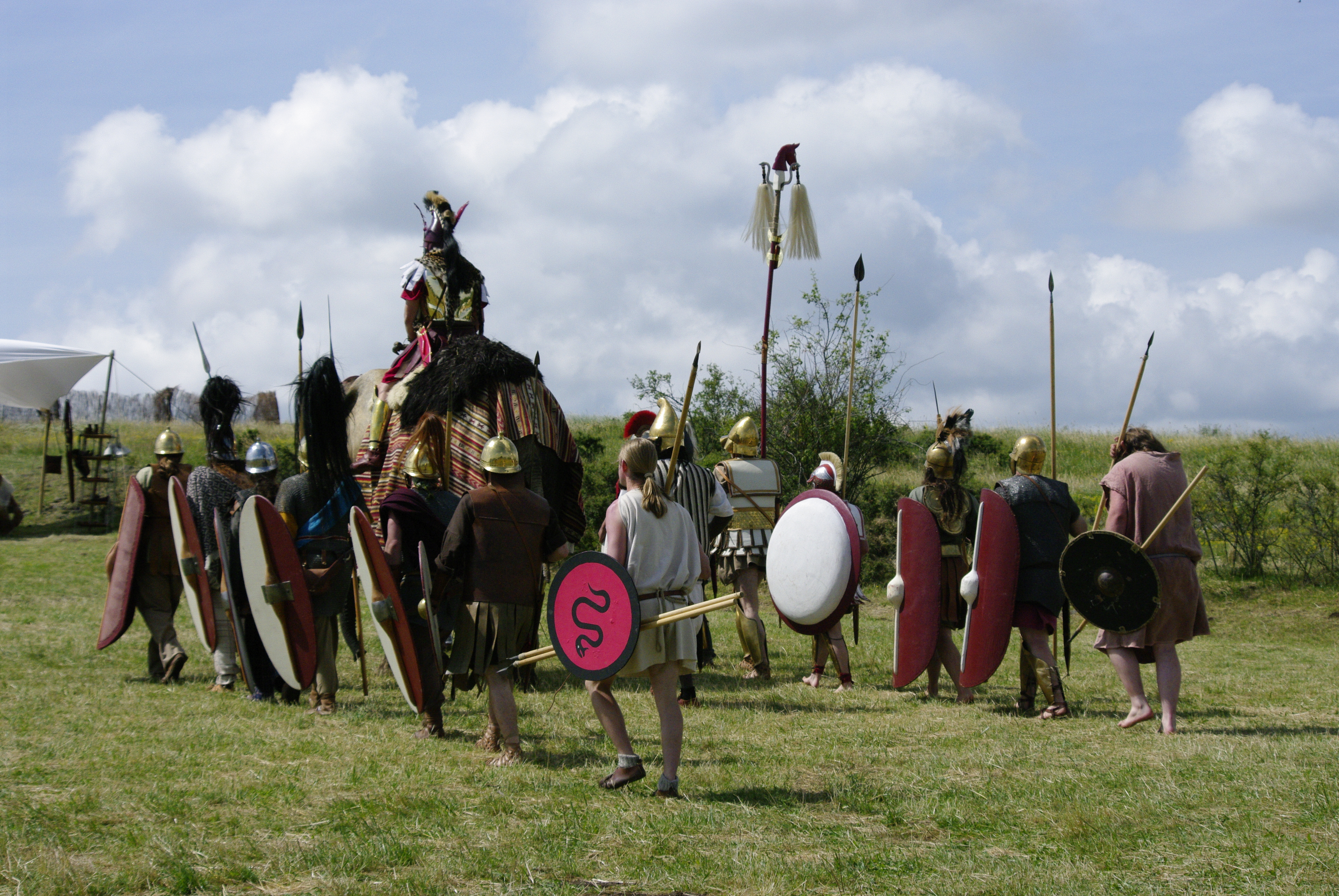
Modern recreations of Carthaginian soldiers and a war elephant at the 2012 Arverniales re-enactment

Carthaginian armies were nearly always composed of foreigners; citizens only served in the army if there was a direct threat to the city of Carthage. Roman sources refer to these foreign fighters derogatively as "mercenaries", but the modern historian Adrian Goldsworthy describes this as "a gross oversimplification". They served under a variety of arrangements; for example, some were the regular troops of allied cities or kingdoms seconded to Carthage as part of formal arrangements. The majority of these foreigners were from North Africa.

Libyans provided close-order infantry equipped with large shields, helmets, short swords and long thrusting spears; as well as close-order shock cavalry carrying spears (Note: "Shock" troops are those trained and used to close rapidly with an opponent, with the intention of breaking them before or immediately upon contact.) (also known as "heavy cavalry") – both were noted for their discipline and staying power. Numidians provided light cavalry who threw javelins from a distance and avoided close combat, and javelin-armed light infantry skirmishers. Both Spain and Gaul provided experienced infantry – unarmoured troops who would charge ferociously, but had a reputation for breaking off if a combat was protracted. Specialist slingers were recruited from the Balearic Islands. The close-order Libyan infantry and the citizen militia would fight in a tightly packed formation known as a phalanx. Sicilians and Italians had also joined up during the war to fill the ranks. The Carthaginians frequently employed war elephants; North Africa had indigenous African forest elephants at the time. (Note: These were typically about 2.5-metre-high (8 ft) at the shoulder, and should not be confused with the larger African bush elephant. The sources are not clear as to whether they carried towers containing fighting men.) Both armies are likely to have been composed of similar types and proportions of troops, except the rebels were weaker in cavalry and lacked elephants.

== Prelude ==
Main manoeuvres during the Mercenary War. The line labelled "6" represents the possible locations of the battle.

Mathos ordered two groups of rebels north to blockade the two main cities – other than Carthage – that had not already come over: the major ports of Utica and Hippo (modern Bizerte). Hanno, as the commander of Carthage's African army, took the field with an army of 8,000–10,000 men and 100 war elephants. Most of the Africans in his force remained loyal; they were accustomed to acting against their fellow Africans. His non-African contingent also remained loyal. An unknown number of Carthaginian citizens were incorporated into this army.

In early 240 BC Hanno was defeated while attempting to raise the siege of Utica at the Battle of Utica. For the rest of the year Hanno skirmished with the rebel force, repeatedly missing opportunities to bring it to battle or to place it at a disadvantage; the military historian Nigel Bagnall writes of Hanno's "incompetence as a field commander". At some point during 240 BC the Carthaginians raised another army, of approximately 10,000. It included deserters from the rebels, newly hired mercenaries, citizen militia, 2,000 cavalry, and 70 elephants, and was placed under the command of Hamilcar Barca, (Note: Father of Hannibal Barca, who won fame during the Second Punic War by crossing the Alps to invade Roman Italy.) who had previously led the Carthaginian forces on Sicily. Hamilcar led this force out from Carthage and a rebel army of 25,000 under Spendius moved to attack it in the Battle of the Bagradas River. After a complex battle, the Carthaginians routed the rebels, who suffered losses of 8,000 men.

Hamilcar was appointed joint commander of the Carthaginian army, alongside Hanno, but there was no cooperation between the two. While Hanno manoeuvred against Mathos to the north near Hippo, Hamilcar confronted several towns and cities that had gone over to the rebels, bringing them back to Carthaginian allegiance with varying mixtures of diplomacy and force. He was shadowed by a superior-sized rebel force under Spendius, assisted by the experienced Gallic commander Autaritus. Spendius felt unable to face Hamilcar's cavalry and elephants in open battle and so stayed on higher and broken ground, where much of the effect of the cavalry and elephants would have been nullified. From here the rebels harried the Carthaginian foragers and scouts. A war of attrition worked for the rebels; with their superior numbers, they could withstand more losses than the Carthaginians. Spendius probably also awaited reinforcements and a favourable situation in which to engage Hamilcar's army. It is not known what measures Hamilcar employed to counter the harassment tactics of Spendius, or the exact route Hamilcar followed after his victory over the rebels at the Bagradas River. Hamilcar's army by this time consisted of between 10,000 and 15,000 men, as well as his elephants. Spendius' force totalled some 20,000–25,000 men: half or more were freshly recruited Libyans, 8,000 were veterans from Sicily – many of them Gauls, under Autaritus – and there were 2,000 Numidian cavalry.

== Engagement ==
Hamilcar marched a long distance to the east during this campaign, but just how far is not known. At some point during these manoeuvres he and the Carthaginian army became trapped in a mountain valley. Locations suggested for the battle by modern historians cover a swathe of territory and include: close to Tunis; near modern Grombalia or close to ancient Nepheris; to the east of the lower Bagradas or close to the Mellane river; between Utica and Hippacra; or near modern Souk al Jamaa. It is unclear from the sources whether Hamilcar becoming trapped was because of a successful stratagem by Spendius, or a failed attempt by Hamilcar to attack an isolated part of the rebel army. Spendius blocked the valley exit with his Libyan contingent, threatening the camp with his main body while the Numidians took a position to the Carthaginian rear. The exact location of this position is not known: there has been much modern speculation, with widely separated possibilities being suggested, but no consensus has been reached. The Carthaginian position was well fortified and had access to water, but food and animal fodder was limited. If Hamilcar was to avoid starvation, he was going to have to leave his camp and attempt to fight his way out against a prepared opponent, with a large enemy force in his rear. Polybius considered this "a great dilemma".

The commander of the 2,000 Numidian cavalry which Spendius had used to plug the pass at the Carthaginians' rear – through which they had entered the valley – was a young Numidian noble named Naravas. During the First Punic War a Roman army had campaigned in North Africa in 256 and 255 BC. Many Numidians had gone over to the Romans, and after the Romans were expelled had been brutally suppressed. Aware of this broad history, the rebel commanders trusted the Numidians to be reliably anti-Carthaginian. However, Naravas' clan had family ties with Carthaginians, and he was apparently impressed by Hamilcar's military ability. He decided to switch sides. Naravas approached the Carthaginian camp undetected with a small escort, signalled for a parley and entered the camp unarmed and alone. He won Hamilcar's trust and was promised the hand of Hamilcar's daughter in marriage in exchange for his help. Naravas returned to his command and took it over to the Carthaginian side.

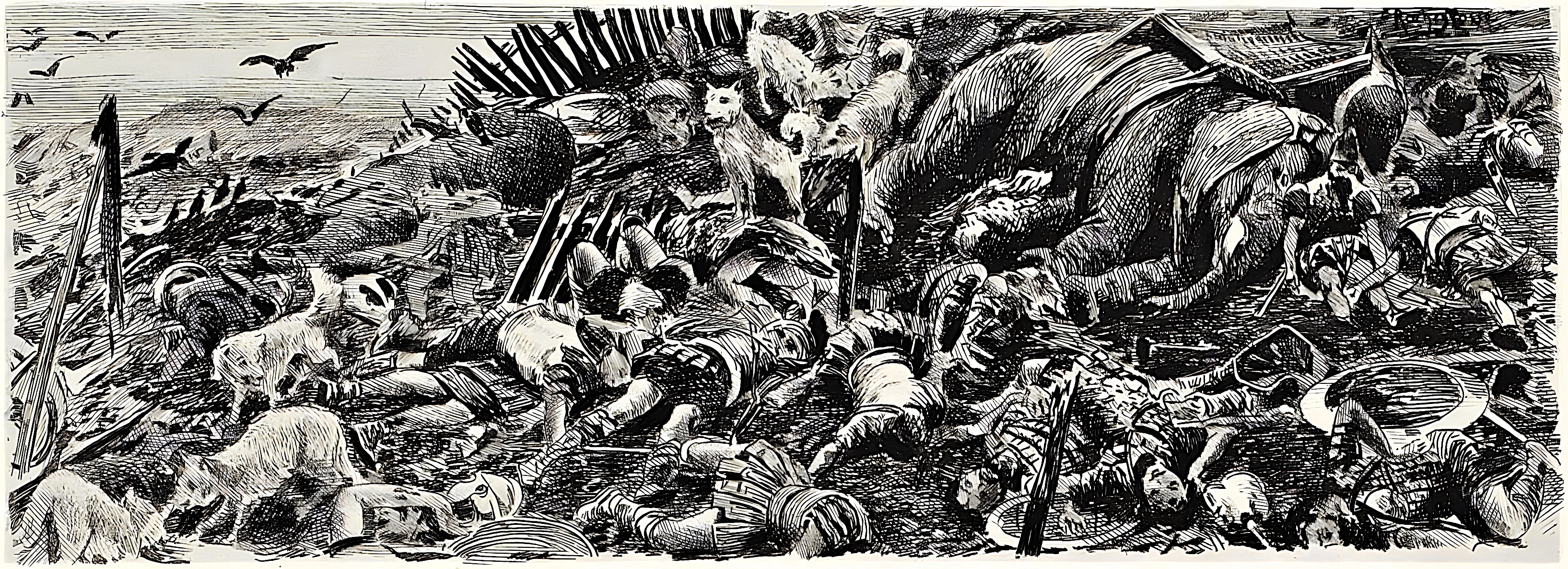
The battlefield after Hamilcar's victory, as envisaged by Georges Rochegrosse and Eugène-André Champollion

With Carthaginian morale high after this unexpected turn of events and their line of retreat secure, Hamilcar had his army leave their fortifications and deploy in battle formation. Spendius, despite his caution prior to Naravas' defection, joined the two remaining rebel forces together and moved down into the valley. The historian Dexter Hoyos believes the rebels would have been better served if their two forces had attacked separately but simultaneously, forcing the Carthaginians to fight in two directions. He ascribes their actual tactics to Spendius not trusting the inexperienced Libyans to manoeuvre independently. After a hotly contested battle, regarding which few details survive, the role of the Carthaginian elephants and the Numidian cavalry proved decisive and the rebels were defeated. They took heavy losses, but their survivors retreated from the field in good order. Rebel casualties were given by Polybius as 10,000 killed and 4,000 captured. Hoyos suggests this may be an exaggeration, but comments that it is not impossible. Spendius and Autaritus escaped the battle and made for Hippo. Carthaginian losses are not known.

Since leaving Carthage, Hamilcar had treated rebels he had captured well and offered them a choice of joining his army or free passage home. He made the same offer to the 4,000 captives from the recent battle. Spendius perceived this generous treatment as the motivation behind Naravas's defection and feared the disintegration of his army; he was aware such generous terms would not be extended to the rebel leaders. Encouraged by his senior subordinates, notably Autaritus, to remove the possibility of any goodwill between the sides, he had 700 Carthaginian prisoners, including Gisco, tortured to death: they had their hands cut off, were castrated, had their legs broken, were thrown into a pit and then buried alive. The Carthaginians, in turn, killed their prisoners. From this point, neither side showed any mercy, and the unusual ferocity of the fighting caused Polybius to term it the "Truceless War". Any further prisoners taken by the Carthaginians were trampled to death by elephants.

== Aftermath ==
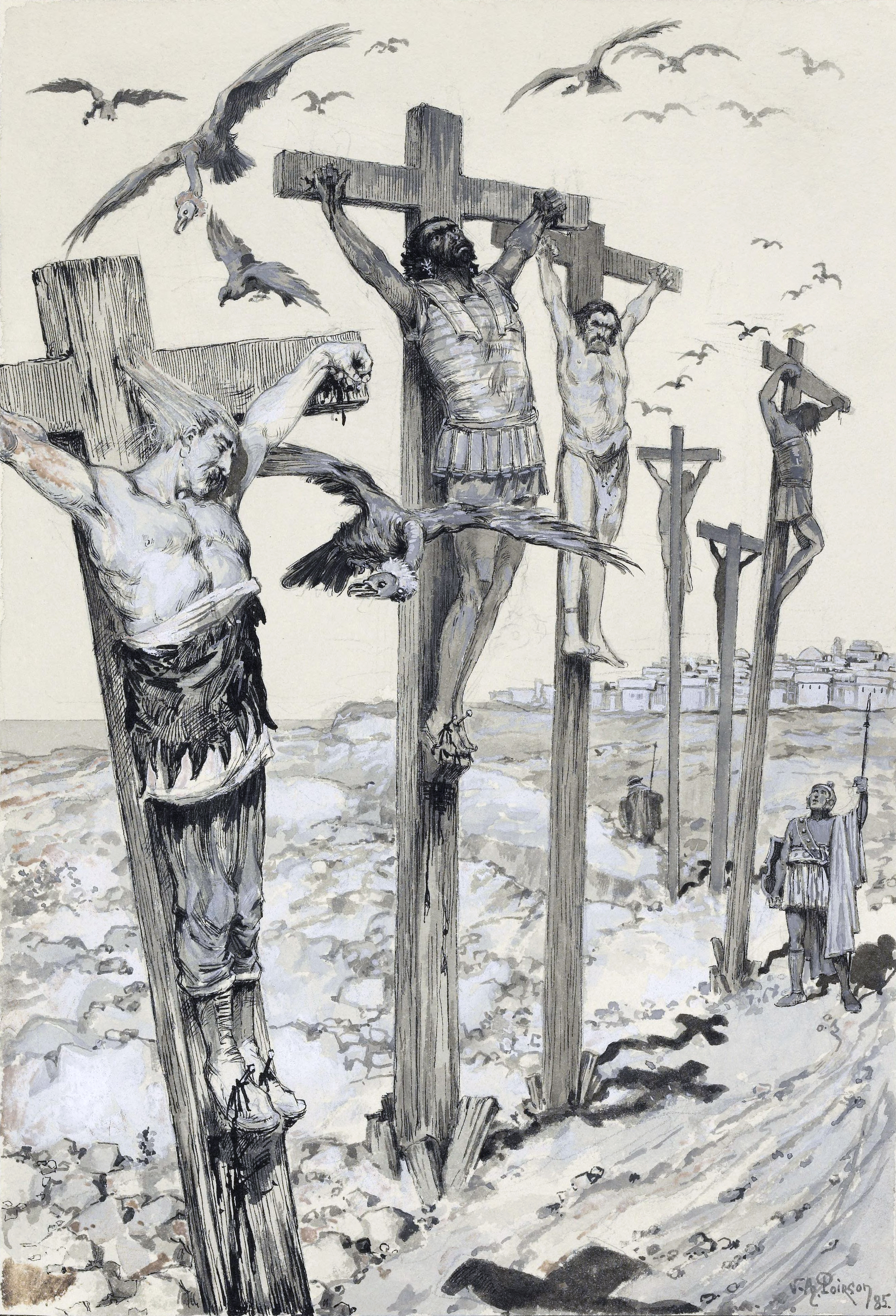
An illustration by Victor Armand Poirson which envisages the crucifixions in front of Tunis

At some point between March and September 239 BC the previously loyal cities of Utica and Hippo slew their Carthaginian garrisons and joined the rebels. Mathos and the rebels previously operating in the area moved south and blockaded Carthage from Tunis. While Mathos maintained the blockade, Spendius led 40,000 men against Hamilcar. After a period of campaigning, the details of which are not clear in the sources, the Carthaginians pinned the rebels in a pass or against a mountain range known as the Saw. Trapped in the mountains and with their food exhausted, the rebels ate their horses, their prisoners and then their slaves, hoping Mathos would sortie from Tunis to rescue them. Eventually, the surrounded troops forced their leaders, including Spendius, to parley with Hamilcar who, on a thin pretext, took them prisoner. The Carthaginians then attacked the leaderless, starving rebels with their whole force, led by their elephants, and massacred them to a man in the Battle of the Saw.

Hamilcar marched on Tunis and laid siege to it in late 238 BC. He occupied a position to the south with half the army, and his deputy Hannibal (Note: Not to be confused with Hannibal Barca, of Second Punic War fame.) was to the north with the rest. The rebel leaders taken captive prior to the Saw were crucified in full view of the city. Mathos ordered a large-scale night attack, which surprised the Carthaginians who suffered many casualties. Hannibal and a delegation of 30 Carthaginian notables who were visiting the army were captured. They were tortured and then nailed to the crosses previously occupied by Spendius and his colleagues. Hamilcar abandoned the siege and withdrew to the north.

Mathos led the rebel army 160 km (100 mi) south to the wealthy port city of Leptis Parva (just south of the modern city of Monastir, Tunisia). Hanno and Hamilcar marched after the rebels and at the ensuing Battle of Leptis Parva the rebels were crushed, with few losses to the Carthaginians. In an act of mercy captives were sold into slavery, except for Mathos who was dragged through the streets of Carthage and tortured to death by its citizens.

Most of the towns and cities which had not already come to terms with Carthage now did so, with the exceptions of Utica and Hippo, whose inhabitants feared vengeance for their massacre of Carthaginians. They attempted to hold out, but Polybius says they too "quickly" surrendered, probably in late 238 BC or very early 237 BC. The surrendered towns and cities were treated leniently, although Carthaginian governors were imposed on them.

== Notes, citations and sources ==
=== Sources ===
- Bagnall, Nigel (1999). The Punic Wars: Rome, Carthage and the Struggle for the Mediterranean. London: Pimlico. ISBN 978-0-7126-6608-4.
- Eckstein, Arthur (2017). "The First Punic War and After, 264-237BC". The Encyclopedia of Ancient Battles. Hoboken, New Jersey: Wiley Online Library. pp. 1–14. doi:10.1002/9781119099000.wbabat0270. ISBN 978-1-4051-8645-2.
- Goldsworthy, Adrian (2006). The Fall of Carthage: The Punic Wars 265–146 BC. London: Phoenix. ISBN 978-0-304-36642-2.
- Hoyos, Dexter (2000). "Towards a Chronology of the 'Truceless War', 241–237 B.C.". Rheinisches Museum für Philologie. 143 (3/4): 369–380. JSTOR 41234468.
- Hoyos, Dexter (2007). Truceless War: Carthage's Fight for Survival, 241 to 237 BC. Leiden; Boston: Brill. ISBN 978-90-474-2192-4.
- Hoyos, Dexter (2015) [2011]. "Carthage in Africa and Spain, 241–218". In Hoyos, Dexter (ed.). A Companion to the Punic Wars. Chichester, West Sussex: John Wiley. pp. 204–222. doi:10.1002/9781444393712.ch12. ISBN 978-1-1190-2550-4.
- Koon, Sam (2015) [2011]. "Phalanx and Legion: the "Face" of Punic War Battle". In Hoyos, Dexter (ed.). A Companion to the Punic Wars. Chichester, West Sussex: John Wiley. pp. 77–94. ISBN 978-1-1190-2550-4.
- Jones, Archer (1987). The Art of War in the Western World. Urbana, Illinois: University of Illinois Press. ISBN 978-0-252-01380-5.
- Lancel, Serge (1995). Hannibal. Paris: Fayard. ISBN 978-2-213-59550-4.
- Lazenby, John (1996). The First Punic War: A Military History. Stanford, California: Stanford University Press. ISBN 978-0-8047-2673-3.
- Miles, Richard (2011). Carthage Must be Destroyed. London: Penguin. ISBN 978-0-141-01809-6.
- Scullard, H. H. (1974). The Elephant in the Greek and Roman World. London: Thames and Hudson. ISBN 978-0-500-40025-8.
- Scullard, H. H. (2006) [1989]. "Carthage and Rome". In Walbank, F. W.; Astin, A. E.; Frederiksen, M. W. & Ogilvie, R. M. (eds.). Cambridge Ancient History. Vol. 7 (2nd ed.). Cambridge: Cambridge University Press. pp. 486–569. ISBN 978-0-521-23446-7.
- Warmington, Brian (1993) [1960]. Carthage. New York: Barnes & Noble, Inc. ISBN 978-1-56619-210-1.
