= Mercenary War =

3rd-century BC mutiny of part of the Carthaginian army

- Part of the Punic Wars
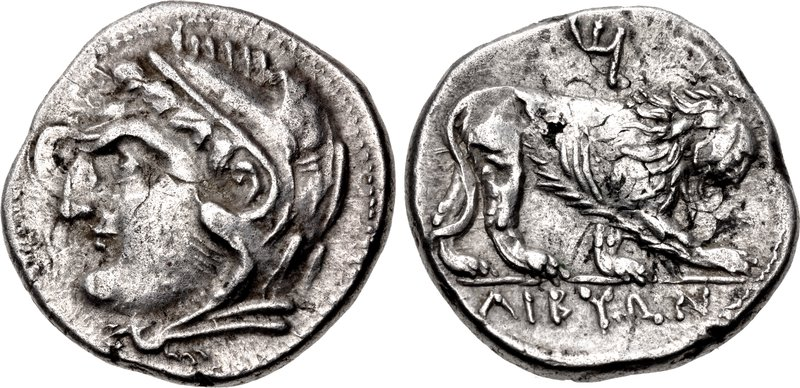
- Shekel minted by the Libyans during the war, depicting Herakles and a lion, with the legend ΛIBYΩN ("the Libyans"). Above the lion, the Phoenician letter M could stand for Mathos, a leader of the rebellion.
Date	241–238 or 237 BC
Location	Carthaginian territory in what is now Tunisia
Result	Carthaginian victory in Africa
Territorial changes	Roman annexation of Sardinia and Corsica

Belligerents
Carthage	• Carthage's mutinous army; • Rebellious African towns

Commanders and leaders
• Hanno; • Hamilcar Barca; • Hannibal (executed); • Naravas	• Spendius (executed); • Matho (executed); • Autaritus (executed); • Zarzas (executed) Naravas

Strength
Unknown	90,000

Casualties and losses
Unknown	High

The Mercenary War, also known as the Truceless War, was a mutiny by troops that were employed by Carthage at the end of the First Punic War (264–241 BC), supported by uprisings of African settlements revolting against Carthaginian control. It lasted from 241 to late 238 or early 237 BC and ended with Carthage suppressing both the mutiny and the revolt.

The war began in 241 BC as a dispute over the payment of wages owed to 20,000 foreign soldiers who had fought for Carthage in Sicily during the First Punic War. When a compromise seemed to have been reached, the army erupted into full-scale mutiny under the leadership of Spendius and Matho. 70,000 Africans from Carthage's oppressed dependent territories flocked to join them, bringing supplies and finance. War-weary Carthage fared poorly in the initial engagements of the war, especially under the generalship of Hanno. Hamilcar Barca, a veteran of the campaigns in Sicily (and father of Hannibal), was given joint command of the army in 240 BC; and supreme command in 239 BC. He campaigned successfully, initially demonstrating leniency in an attempt to woo the rebels over. To prevent this, in 240 BC Spendius and Autaritus tortured 700 Carthaginian prisoners to death (including Gisco), after which the war was pursued with great brutality on both sides.

By early 237 BC, after numerous setbacks, the rebels were defeated and their cities brought back under Carthaginian rule. An expedition was prepared to reoccupy Sardinia, where mutinous soldiers had slaughtered all Carthaginians. However, Rome declared that this would be an act of war and occupied both Sardinia and Corsica, in contravention of the recent peace treaty. This has been considered to be the single greatest cause of war with Carthage breaking out again in 218 BC in the Second Punic War.

== Primary sources ==
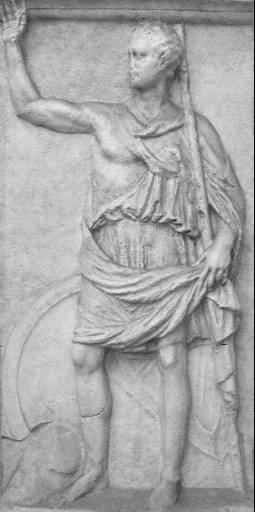
Polybius, whose work The Histories recounts the Mercenary War

The main source for almost every aspect of the Punic Wars (Note: The term Punic comes from the Latin word Punicus (or Poenicus), meaning "Carthaginian", and is a reference to the Carthaginians' Phoenician ancestry.) is the historian Polybius (c. 200 – c. 118 BC), a Greek sent to Rome in 167 BC as a hostage. His works include a now-lost manual on military tactics, but he is known today for The Histories, written sometime after 146 BC, or about a century after this war. Polybius's work is considered broadly objective and largely neutral as between Carthaginian and Roman points of view.

Carthaginian written records were destroyed along with their capital, Carthage, in 146 BC and so Polybius's account of the Mercenary War is based on several, now-lost, Greek and Latin sources. Polybius was an analytical historian and wherever possible personally interviewed participants in the events he wrote about. He was on the staff of Scipio Aemilianus when he led a Roman army during the Third Punic War on a campaign through many of the locations of the actions of the Mercenary War. Only part of the first book of the 40 comprising The Histories deals with this war. The accuracy of Polybius's account has been much debated over the past 150 years, but the modern consensus is to accept it largely at face value, and the details of the war in modern sources are almost entirely based on interpretations of Polybius's account. The modern historian Andrew Curry considers that "Polybius turns out to [be] fairly reliable"; while Craige Champion describes him as "a remarkably well-informed, industrious, and insightful historian". Other, later, histories of the war exist, but in fragmentary or summary form. Modern historians also take into account the later histories of Diodorus Siculus and Dio Cassius, although the classicist Adrian Goldsworthy states that "Polybius' account is usually to be preferred when it differs with any of our other accounts". (Note: Sources other than Polybius are discussed by Bernard Mineo in "Principal Literary Sources for the Punic Wars (apart from Polybius)".) Other sources include inscriptions, coins and archaeological evidence.

== Background ==
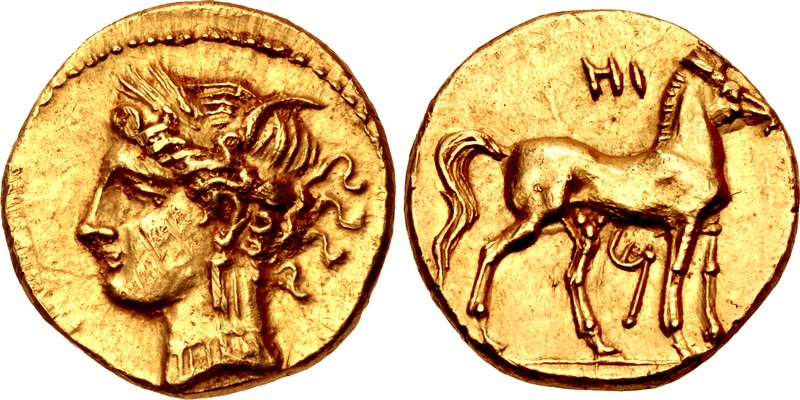
Half shekel of Carthage. It is probably the coin mentioned by Polybius, who tells that Hamilcar's mercenaries were given a gold coin as first payment when they returned from Sicily in 241 BC.

The First Punic War was fought between Carthage and Rome, the two main powers of the western Mediterranean in the 3rd century BC, and lasted for 23 years, from 264 to 241 BC. Rome still exists as the capital of Italy, while Carthage was razed by Rome in a later war; its ruins lie 16 kilometres (10 mi) east of modern Tunis on the North African coast. The two powers struggled for supremacy primarily on the Mediterranean island of Sicily and its surrounding waters, and also in North Africa. It was the longest continuous conflict and the greatest naval war of antiquity. After immense materiel and human losses on both sides, the Carthaginians were defeated. The Carthaginian Senate ordered the commander of its forces on Sicily, Hamilcar Barca, to negotiate a peace treaty; he delegated this to his deputy Gisco. The Treaty of Lutatius was signed and brought the First Punic War to its end. By the treaty's terms, Carthage evacuated Sicily, handed over all prisoners taken during the war, and paid an indemnity of 3,200 talents (Note: 3,200 talents was approximately 82,000 kg (81 long tons) of silver.) – 1,000 talents of this was due immediately, the balance over ten years.

While the war with Rome was being played out, the Carthaginian general Hanno, who was one of several Carthaginian Hannos known as "the great", was leading a series of campaigns which greatly increased the area of Africa controlled by Carthage. He extended its control to Theveste (modern Tébessa, Algeria) 300 km (190 mi) south-west of their capital. Hanno was rigorous in squeezing taxes out of the newly conquered territory to pay for both the war with Rome and his campaigns. Half of all agricultural output was taken as war tax, and the tribute previously due from towns and cities was doubled. These exactions were harshly enforced, causing extreme hardship in many areas.

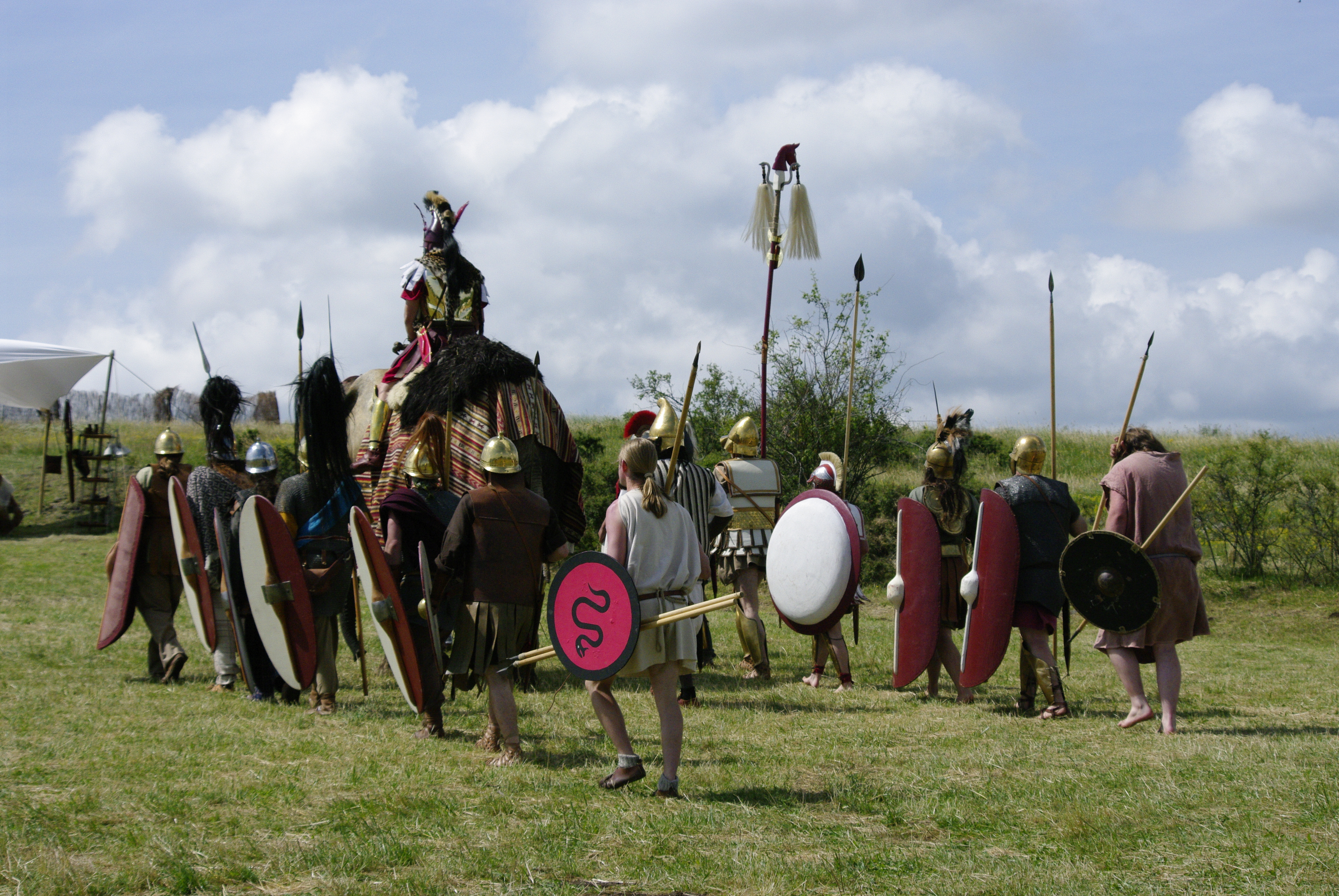
Modern recreations of Carthaginian soldiers and a war elephant at the 2012 Arverniales re-enactment

Carthaginian armies were nearly always composed of foreigners; citizens served in the army only if there was a direct threat to the city of Carthage. The majority of these foreigners were from North Africa. Libyans provided close-order infantry equipped with large shields, helmets, short swords and long thrusting spears; as well as close-order shock cavalry carrying spears – both were noted for their discipline and staying power. Numidians provided light cavalry who threw javelins from a distance and avoided close combat, and javelin-armed light infantry skirmishers. Both Spain and Gaul provided experienced infantry; unarmoured troops who would charge ferociously, but had a reputation for breaking off if combat was protracted. (Note: The Spanish used a heavy throwing spear which the Romans were later to adopt as the pilum.) The close-order Libyan infantry, and citizen militia when present, would fight in a tightly-packed formation known as a phalanx. Two thousand slingers were recruited from the Balearic Islands. Sicilians and Italians had also joined up during the war to fill the ranks. The Carthaginians frequently employed war elephants; North Africa had indigenous African forest elephants at the time. Roman sources refer to these foreign fighters derogatively as "mercenaries", but Goldsworthy describes this as "a gross oversimplification". They served under a variety of arrangements; for example, some were the regular troops of allied cities or kingdoms seconded to Carthage as part of formal arrangements.

=== Mutiny ===
After receiving orders to make peace on whatever terms he could negotiate, Hamilcar left Sicily in a rage, convinced that the surrender was unnecessary. The evacuation of the Carthaginian army of 20,000 men from Sicily was left in the hands of Gisco. Not wishing the freshly idle soldiers to combine for purposes of their own, Gisco split the army into small detachments based on their regions of origin. He sent these back to Carthage one at a time. He anticipated they would be promptly paid the several years' back pay they were owed and hurried on their way home. The Carthaginian authorities decided to instead wait until all of the troops had arrived and then attempt to negotiate a settlement at a lower rate. Meanwhile, as each group arrived it was billeted inside the city of Carthage where the advantages of civilisation were appreciated to the full after up to eight years under siege. This "tumultuous licentiousness" so alarmed the city's authorities that before the full 20,000 had arrived they were relocated to Sicca Veneria (modern El Kef), 180 km (110 mi) away, even though much of their arrears had to be paid before they would go.

Freed of their long period of military discipline and with nothing to do, the men grumbled among themselves and refused all attempts by the Carthaginians to pay them less than the full amount due. Frustrated by the Carthaginian negotiators' attempts to haggle, all 20,000 troops marched to Tunis, 16 km (10 mi) from Carthage. Panicking, the Senate agreed to pay in full. The mutinous troops responded by demanding even more. Gisco, who had a good reputation with the army, was brought over from Sicily in late 241 BC and despatched to the camp with enough money to pay most of what was owed. He started to disburse this, with promises that the balance would be paid as soon as it could be raised. The discontent seemed to have abated when, for some unknown reason, discipline broke down. Several soldiers insisted that no deal with Carthage was acceptable, a riot broke out, dissenters were stoned to death, Gisco and his staff were taken prisoner and his treasury was seized. Spendius, an escaped Roman slave who faced death by torture if he were recaptured, and Matho, a Berber dissatisfied with Hanno's attitude towards tax-raising from Carthage's African possessions, were declared generals. The news of a formed, experienced, anti-Carthaginian army in the heart of its territory spread rapidly and many cities and towns rose in rebellion. Provisions, money and reinforcements poured in; an additional 70,000 men according to Polybius. Rebel coins from this period read 'from the Libyans', suggesting the mutinous troops were hired by the Libyan cities. In turn, the rebelling Libyans may have been led by Zarzas. Other coins minted by the insurgents were engraved with the Punic letters "A, M, or Z", with the historian Louis Rawlings surmising that these stood for the rebels' main leaders: Autaritus, Mathos, and Zarzas. The pay dispute had become a full-scale revolt threatening Carthage's existence as a state.

== War ==
=== Hanno ===
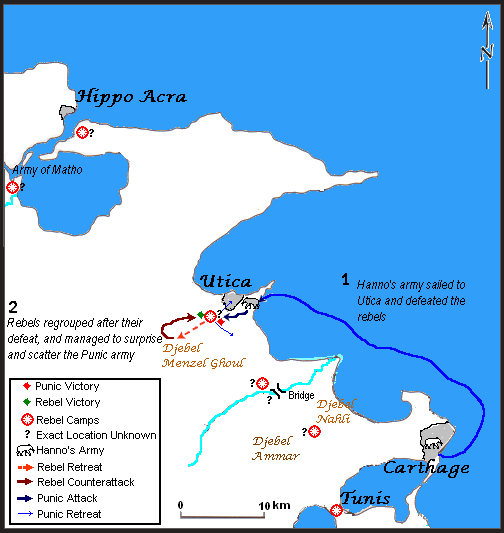
The Battle of Utica

Hanno, as the commander of Carthage's African army, took the field. Most of the Africans in his force remained loyal; they were accustomed to acting against their fellow Africans. His non-African contingent had remained quartered in Carthage when the army of Sicily was expelled, and also remained loyal. The few troops still in Sicily were paid up to date and redeployed with Hanno, and money was raised to hire fresh troops. An unknown number of Carthaginian citizens were incorporated into Hanno's army. By the time Hanno assembled this force, the rebels had already blockaded Utica and Hippo (modern Bizerte).

In early 240 BC Hanno set off with the army to relieve Utica; he took with him 100 elephants and a siege train. (Note: The military historian Nigel Bagnall queries the utility of the siege train, as the rebels held no towns which could be besieged.) Hanno stormed the rebels' camp in the Battle of Utica and his elephants routed the besiegers. Hanno's army took over the camp and Hanno himself entered the city in triumph. However, the battle-hardened veterans of the Sicilian army regrouped in the nearby hills and, not being pursued, returned towards Utica. The Carthaginians, accustomed to fighting the militias of the Numidian cities, were still celebrating their victory when the rebels counter-attacked. The Carthaginians fled, with great loss of life, losing their baggage and siege trains. For the rest of the year Hanno skirmished with the rebel force, repeatedly missing opportunities to bring it to battle or to place it at a disadvantage; the military historian Nigel Bagnall writes of Hanno's "incompetence as a field commander".

Rome pointedly declined to take advantage of Carthage's troubles. Italians were prohibited from trading with the rebels but encouraged to trade with Carthage; 2,743 Carthaginian prisoners still held were released without a ransom being required and were immediately enrolled into Carthage's army. Hiero, the king of the Roman satellite kingdom of Syracuse, was allowed to supply Carthage with the large amounts of food it needed and was no longer able to obtain from its hinterland. In late 240 or early 239 BC, the Carthaginian garrisons on Sardinia joined the mutiny, killing their officers and the island's governor. The Carthaginians sent a force to retake the island. When it arrived its members also mutinied, joined the previous mutineers, and killed all of the Carthaginians on the island. The mutineers then appealed to Rome for protection, which was refused. The classicist Richard Miles writes that "Rome was in no shape to embark on yet another war" and wished to avoid acquiring a reputation for supporting mutinous uprisings.

=== Hamilcar ===
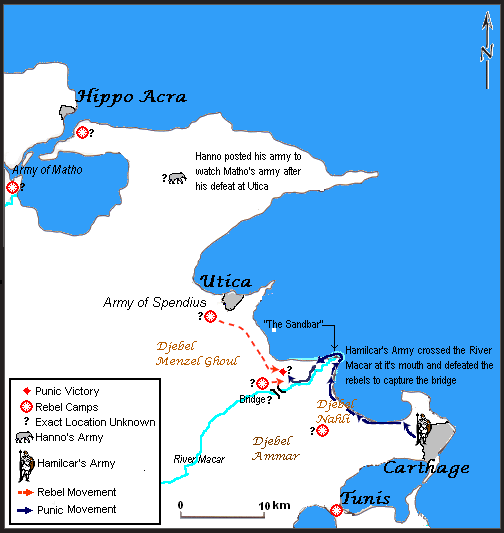
The Battle of the Bagradas River

At some point during 240 BC the Carthaginians raised another, smaller, force, of approximately 10,000. It included deserters from the rebels, 2,000 cavalry, and 70 elephants. This was placed under the command of Hamilcar, who had commanded the Carthaginian forces on Sicily for the last six years of the First Punic War. The rebels held the line of the Bagradas River with 10,000 men commanded by Spendius. Hamilcar would need to force a crossing if he were to gain access to open country where he could manoeuvre. He did so by a stratagem, and Spendius was reinforced by an additional 15,000 men drawn from the force laying siege to Utica, which the rebels had renewed. The rebel army of 25,000 moved to attack Hamilcar in the Battle of the Bagradas River. What happened next is unclear: it seems Hamilcar feigned a retreat, the rebels broke ranks to pursue, the Carthaginians turned in good order and counter-attacked, routing the rebels, who suffered losses of 8,000 men.

Hamilcar was appointed joint commander of the Carthaginian army, alongside Hanno, but there was no cooperation between the two. While Hanno manoeuvred against Matho to the north near Hippo, Hamilcar confronted various towns and cities which had gone over to the rebels, bringing them back to Carthaginian allegiance with varying mixtures of diplomacy and force. He was shadowed by a superior-sized rebel force, which kept to rough ground for fear of Hamilcar's cavalry and elephants, and harried his foragers and scouts. South west of Utica, Hamilcar moved his force into the mountains in an attempt to bring the rebels to battle, but was surrounded. The Carthaginians were saved from destruction only when a Numidian leader, Naravas, who had served with and admired Hamilcar in Sicily, swapped sides, bringing 2,000 cavalry with him. This proved disastrous for the rebels, and in the resulting battle, 10,000 were killed and 4,000 captured.

=== Truceless War ===
Main manoeuvres during the war

Since leaving Carthage, Hamilcar had treated rebels he had captured well and offered them a choice of joining his army or free passage home. He made the same offer to the 4,000 captives from the recent battle. The rebel leaders perceived this generous treatment as the motivation behind Naravas's defection and feared the disintegration of their army; they were aware that such generous terms would not be extended to them personally. To remove the possibility of any goodwill between the sides, Spendius, encouraged by his fellow leader the Gaul Autaritus, had 700 Carthaginian prisoners, including Gisco, tortured to death: they had their hands cut off, were castrated, had their legs broken and were thrown into a pit and buried alive. The mercenary leader and skilled polyglot orator Autaritus is cited by Polybius as a chief instigator of this massacre. Hamilcar, in turn, killed his prisoners. From this point, neither side showed any mercy, and the unusual ferocity of the fighting caused Polybius to term it the "Truceless War". Any further prisoners taken by the Carthaginians were trampled to death by elephants.

At some point between March and September 239 BC the previously loyal cities of Utica and Hippo slew their Carthaginian garrisons and joined the rebels. The people of Utica offered their city to the Romans, who, consistent with their response to the mutineers on Sardinia, declined. The rebels previously operating in the area moved south and laid siege to Carthage.

Having a clear superiority in cavalry, Hamilcar raided the supply lines of the rebels around Carthage. In mid-239 BC, he was joined by Hanno and his army, but the two men disagreed as to the best strategy and operations were paralysed. Unusually, the choice of supreme commander was put to a vote of the army – possibly only the officers – and Hamilcar was elected; Hanno left the army. In early 238 BC the lack of supplies forced the rebels to lift the siege of Carthage. They fell back to Tunis, from where they maintained a more distant blockade. While Matho maintained the blockade, Spendius led 40,000 men against Hamilcar. As in the previous year, they stayed to the higher and rougher terrain and harassed the Carthaginian army. After a period of campaigning, the details of which are not clear in the sources, Hamilcar trapped the rebels in a pass or mountain range known as the Saw. Pinned against mountains and with their food exhausted, the rebels ate their horses, their prisoners and then their slaves, hoping that Matho would sortie from Tunis to rescue them. Eventually, the surrounded troops forced their leaders to parley with Hamilcar, but on a thin pretext, he took Spendius and his lieutenants prisoner. The rebels then attempted to fight their way out in the Battle of the Saw and were massacred to a man.

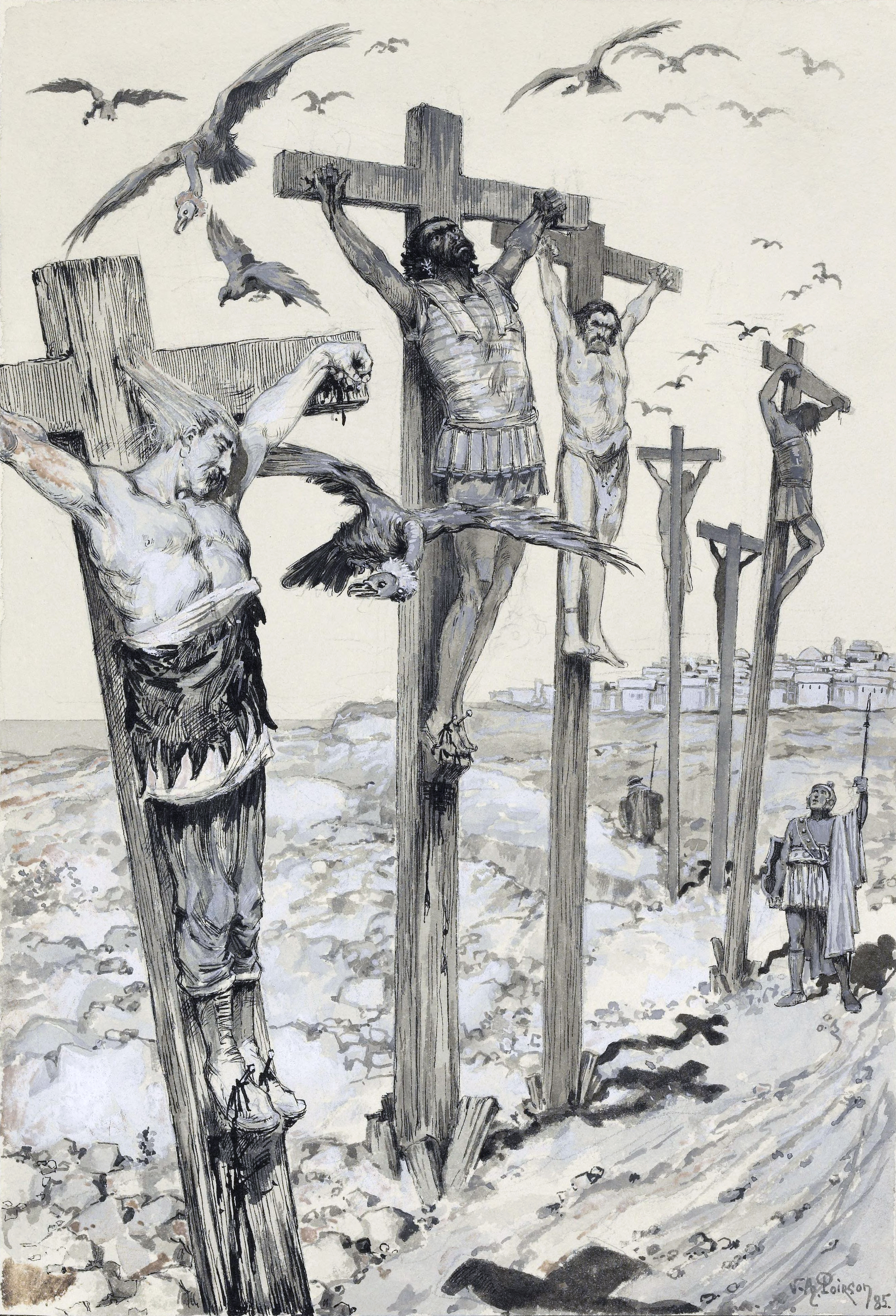
The nineteenth-century French illustrator Victor Armand Poirson envisages the crucifixion of Spendius and his lieutenants in front of Tunis.

Hamilcar then marched on Tunis and laid siege to it in late 238 BC. The city was difficult to access from both the east and the west, so Hamilcar occupied a position to the south with half the army, and his deputy Hannibal (Note: Not to be confused with Hannibal Barca, of Second Punic War fame.) was to the north with the balance. The rebel leaders taken captive prior to the Saw were crucified in full view of the city. Matho ordered a large-scale night attack, which surprised the Carthaginians, who suffered many casualties. One of their camps was overrun and they lost much of their baggage. In addition, Hannibal and a delegation of 30 Carthaginian notables who were visiting the army were captured. They were tortured and then nailed to the crosses previously occupied by Spendius and his colleagues. Hamilcar abandoned the siege and withdrew to the north.

The Senate encouraged reconciliation between Hanno and Hamilcar, and they agreed to serve together. Meanwhile, Matho and his army had left Tunis and marched 160 km (100 mi) south to the wealthy city of Leptis Parva, which had risen against Carthage earlier in the war. Hanno and Hamilcar marched after them with an army totalling perhaps 40,000 including every Carthaginian citizen of military age. The rebels, rather than wait to be besieged, met the Carthaginians in open battle in mid-to-late 238 BC. No details of the battle survive, but the remaining 30,000 rebels were wiped out and Matho captured with few losses to the Carthaginians. Any other prisoners were crucified, while Matho was dragged through the streets of Carthage and tortured to death by its inhabitants. Most of the towns and cities which had not already come to terms with Carthage now did so, with the exceptions of Utica and Hippo, whose inhabitants feared vengeance for their massacre of Carthaginians. They attempted to hold out, but Polybius says that they too "quickly" surrendered, probably in late 238 or very early 237 BC. The surrendered towns and cities were treated leniently, although Carthaginian governors were imposed on them.

=== Sardinia ===
Probably in 237 BC, the indigenous inhabitants of Sardinia rose up and drove out the mutinous garrison, which took refuge in Italy. As the war in Africa came to a close, they appealed again for Roman assistance. This time the Romans agreed and prepared an expedition to seize both Sardinia and Corsica. It is unclear from the sources why the Romans acted differently from three years earlier. Polybius held that this action was indefensible. Carthage sent an embassy to Rome, which quoted the Treaty of Lutatius and claimed they were outfitting their own expedition to retake the island, which it had held for 300 years. The Roman Senate cynically stated that they considered the preparation of this force an act of war. Their peace terms were the ceding of Sardinia and Corsica and the payment of an additional 1,200 talent indemnity. (Note: 1,200 talents was approximately 30,000 kg (30 long tons) of silver.) Weakened by 30 years of war, Carthage agreed rather than enter into a conflict with Rome again.

== Aftermath ==
The Romans required a strong military presence on Sardinia and Corsica for at least the next seven years, as they struggled to suppress the local inhabitants. The seizure of Sardinia and Corsica by Rome and the additional indemnity fuelled resentment in Carthage. Polybius considered this act of bad faith by the Romans to be the single greatest cause of war with Carthage breaking out again nineteen years later. The role of Hamilcar Barca in the victory greatly enhanced the prestige and power of the Barcid family. Immediately after the war, Hamilcar led many of his veterans on an expedition to expand Carthaginian holdings in southern Iberia; this was to become a semi-autonomous Barcid fiefdom. In 218 BC, a Carthaginian army under Hannibal Barca besieged the Roman-protected town of Saguntum in eastern Iberia, providing the spark which ignited the Second Punic War.

The historian Dexter Hoyos writes that "the truceless war ... produce[d] a complete and enduring reversal of Carthage's domestic fortunes and military orientation". Miles agrees there was "a period of profound political transformation". Carthage never regained control over its army: generals continued to be, like Hamilcar, selected by their armies; the troops in Spain effectively became the Barcids' private army. Internally the opinions of both the Barcids and the Popular Assembly increasingly dictated to the old-established bodies of the Senate and the Tribunal.

== See also ==
- Salammbô: a novel by Gustave Flaubert set during the war

== Notes, citations and sources ==
=== Sources ===
- Bagnall, Nigel (1999). The Punic Wars: Rome, Carthage and the Struggle for the Mediterranean. London: Pimlico. ISBN 978-0-7126-6608-4.
- Carradice, Ian A. (1988). "The Libyan War and Coinage: a New Hoard and the Evidence of Metal Analysis". The Numismatic Chronicle. 148: 33–52. JSTOR 42668126.
- Champion, Craige B. (2015) [2011]. "Polybius and the Punic Wars". In Hoyos, Dexter (ed.). A Companion to the Punic Wars. Chichester, West Sussex: John Wiley. pp. 95–110. ISBN 978-1-1190-2550-4.
- Collins, Roger (1998). Spain: An Oxford Archaeological Guide. Oxford: Oxford University Press. ISBN 978-0-19-285300-4.
- Curry, Andrew (2012). "The Weapon That Changed History". Archaeology. 65 (1): 32–37. JSTOR 41780760.
- Eckstein, Arthur (2017). "The First Punic War and After, 264-237 BC". The Encyclopedia of Ancient Battles. Wiley Online Library. pp. 1–14. doi:10.1002/9781119099000.wbabat0270. ISBN 978-1405186452.
- Goldsworthy, Adrian (2006). The Fall of Carthage: The Punic Wars 265–146 BC. London: Phoenix. ISBN 978-0-304-36642-2.
- Hau, Lisa (2016). Moral History from Herodotus to Diodorus Siculus. Edinburgh: Edinburgh University Press. ISBN 978-1-4744-1107-3.
- Hoyos, Dexter (2000). "Towards a Chronology of the 'Truceless War', 241–237 B.C.". Rheinisches Museum für Philologie. 143 (3/4): 369–380. JSTOR 41234468.
- Hoyos, Dexter (2007). Truceless War: Carthage's Fight for Survival, 241 to 237 BC. Leiden; Boston: Brill. ISBN 978-90-474-2192-4.
- Hoyos, Dexter (2015) [2011]. "Carthage in Africa and Spain, 241–218". In Hoyos, Dexter (ed.). A Companion to the Punic Wars. Chichester, West Sussex: John Wiley. pp. 204–222. ISBN 978-1-1190-2550-4.
- Rawlings, Louis (2017). "Warlords, Carthage and the Limits of Hegemony". In Naco del Hoyo, Toni; Lopez Sanchez, Fernando (eds.). War, Warlords, and Interstate Relations in the Ancient Mediterranean. Leiden: Brill Publishers. pp. 151–180. ISBN 978-9004354043.
- Jones, Peter V.; Sidwell, Keith C. (2003) [1998]. The World of Rome: An Introduction to Roman Culture. Cambridge: Cambridge University Press. ISBN 978-0-521-38600-5.
- Koon, Sam (2015) [2011]. "Phalanx and Legion: the "Face" of Punic War Battle". In Hoyos, Dexter (ed.). A Companion to the Punic Wars. Chichester, West Sussex: John Wiley. pp. 77–94. ISBN 978-1-1190-2550-4.
- Lazenby, John (1996). The First Punic War: A Military History. Stanford, California: Stanford University Press. ISBN 978-0-8047-2673-3.
- Miles, Richard (2011). Carthage Must be Destroyed. London: Penguin. ISBN 978-0-141-01809-6.
- Mineo, Bernard (2015) [2011]. "Principal Literary Sources for the Punic Wars (apart from Polybius)". In Hoyos, Dexter (ed.). A Companion to the Punic Wars. Chichester, West Sussex: John Wiley. pp. 111–128. ISBN 978-1-1190-2550-4.
- Robinson, E. S. G. (1956). "The Libyan Hoard (1952): Addenda, and the Libyan Coinage in General". The Numismatic Chronicle and Journal of the Royal Numismatic Society. 16: 9–14. JSTOR 42678379.
- Scullard, H.H. (2006) [1989]. "Carthage and Rome". In Walbank, F. W.; Astin, A. E.; Frederiksen, M. W. & Ogilvie, R. M. (eds.). Cambridge Ancient History: Volume 7, Part 2, 2nd Edition. Cambridge: Cambridge University Press. pp. 486–569. ISBN 0-521-23446-8.
- Shutt, Rowland (1938). "Polybius: A Sketch". Greece & Rome. 8 (22): 50–57. doi:10.1017/S001738350000588X. JSTOR 642112. S2CID 162905667.
- Tipps, G.K. (1985). "The Battle of Ecnomus". Historia: Zeitschrift für Alte Geschichte. 34 (4): 432–465. JSTOR 4435938.
- Walbank, F. W. (1990). Polybius. Vol. 1. Berkeley: University of California Press. ISBN 978-0-520-06981-7.
- Warmington, Brian (1993) [1960]. Carthage. New York: Barnes & Noble, Inc. ISBN 978-1-56619-210-1.
- Lendering, Jona (2022). De Vergeten Oorlog. Utrecht: Omniboek. ISBN 9789401918640.
