= Conquest of Theveste =

Date	247 BC
Location	Theveste
Result	Carthaginian victory
Territorial changes	Theveste is conquered by Carthage

Belligerents
Carthage	Numidians

Commanders and leaders
Hanno II the Great	Unknown

Strength
Unknown	Unknown

Casualties and losses
Unknown	3,000 hostages

The conquest of Hectamophylos, the future Theveste, took place in 247 BC and opposed Hanno II the Great to the Berber Numidians, aiming at the expansion of Carthage.

In 241 BC, as the First Punic War came to an end, the Carthaginians, led by Hanno II the Great, considered it time to consolidate their territory and expand eastward. As a result, the first targeted city was Hecatompylos, located about 160 km from Carthage.

The expedition was carried out smoothly thanks to the diplomatic skills of Hanno II the Great. The soldiers were welcomed as guests rather than conquerors, but the Carthaginian general nevertheless demanded 3,000 hostages.

Theveste remained under Carthaginian control for only 50 years; afterwards, it came under the authority of King Syphax.
