= Battle of Utica =

Battle of the Mercenary War

- Part of the Mercenary War
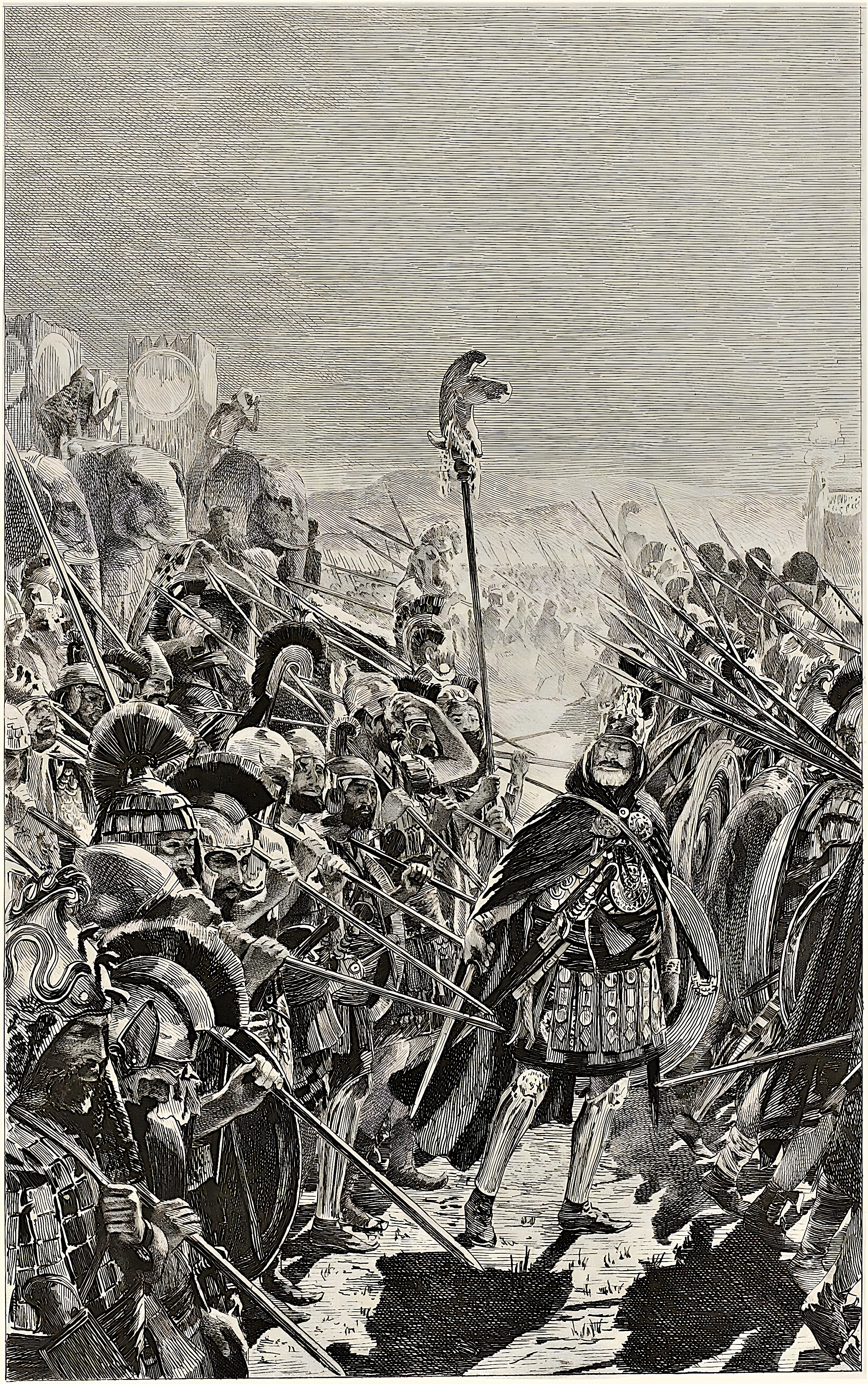
- Hanno leads his army against the rebels, as envisaged by Georges Rochegrosse and Eugène-André Champollion
| Date | January or February 240 BC |
| Location | Utica, Tunisia 37.058052°N 10.062855°E |
| Result | Rebel victory |

Belligerents
| Carthage | Rebels |

Commanders and leaders
| Hanno the Great | Uncertain: probably Spendius |

Strength
| 8,000–10,000 men 100 war elephants | 10,000 |

Casualties and losses
| Unknown | Unknown |
- Location within Tunisia Battle of Utica (Mediterranean)

The Battle of Utica took place early in 240 BC between a Carthaginian army commanded by Hanno and a force of rebellious mutineers possibly led by Spendius. It was the first major engagement of the Mercenary War between Carthage and the combined forces of mutinous ex-Carthaginian troops and rebellious African cities which broke out in the wake of the First Punic War. Both sides were routed during the course of the battle, which ended with the rebels occupying the field but was strategically inconclusive.

The rebel army, some 10,000 strong, was blockading the city of Utica when the Carthaginian army of 8,000–10,000 men and 100 elephants stormed their camp and routed them. Satisfied with their victory, the Carthaginians failed to pursue and dispersed to loot, forage and celebrate. The rebels regrouped, returned, attacked the Carthaginians who were occupying their old camp and routed them in turn. The Carthaginians were also not effectively pursued and regrouped to continue the campaign. The bitter war which followed ended in 238 BC with a Carthaginian victory.

== Background ==
The First Punic War was fought between Carthage and Rome, the two main powers of the western Mediterranean in the 3rd century BC, and lasted for 23 years, from 264 to 241 BC. The two powers struggled for supremacy primarily on the Mediterranean island of Sicily and its surrounding waters, and also in North Africa. While the war with Rome was being fought on Sicily, the Carthaginian general Hanno was leading a series of campaigns which greatly increased the area of Africa controlled by Carthage. He extended its control to Theveste (modern Tébessa, Algeria) 300 km (190 mi) south-west of their capital. Hanno was rigorous in squeezing taxes out of the newly conquered territory in order to pay for both the war with Rome and his own campaigns. Half of all agricultural output was taken as war tax, and the tribute previously due from all towns and cities was doubled. These exactions were harshly enforced, causing extreme hardship in many areas.

After immense materiel and human losses on both sides during the First Punic War, the Carthaginians were defeated. The Carthaginian Senate ordered the commander of its forces on Sicily, Hamilcar Barca, to negotiate a peace treaty on whatever terms he could; convinced that the surrender was unnecessary, he left Sicily in a rage, delegating negotiations to his deputy Gisco. The Treaty of Lutatius was agreed and brought the First Punic War to an end in 241 BC.

=== Mutiny ===
The post-war evacuation of the Carthaginian army of 20,000 men from Sicily was left in the hands of Gisco. He split the army into small detachments based on their regions of origin and sent these back to Carthage one at a time. He anticipated they would be promptly paid the several years' back pay they were owed and hurried on their way home. The Carthaginian authorities decided instead to wait until all of the troops had arrived and then attempt to negotiate a settlement at a lower rate. They despatched the returning troops to Sicca Veneria (modern El Kef), 180 km (110 mi) away.

Freed of their long period of military discipline and with nothing to do, the men grumbled among themselves and refused all attempts by the Carthaginians to pay them less than the full amount due. Frustrated by the Carthaginian negotiators' attempts to haggle, all 20,000 troops marched to Tunis, 16 km (10 mi) from Carthage. Panicking, the Senate agreed to payment in full. The mutinous troops responded by demanding even more. Gisco, who had a good reputation with the army, was brought over from Sicily in late 241 BC and despatched to the camp with enough money to pay most of what was owed. He started to disburse this, with promises that the balance would be paid as soon as it could be raised, when discipline broke down. Several soldiers insisted that no deal with Carthage was acceptable, a riot broke out, men who stayed loyal to Carthage were stoned to death, Gisco and his staff were taken prisoner, and his treasury was seized.

The rebels declared Spendius, an escaped Roman slave who faced death by torture if he were recaptured, and Mathos, a Berber dissatisfied with Hanno's attitude towards tax raising from Carthage's African possessions, their generals. The news of a formed, experienced, anti-Carthaginian army in the heart of its territory spread rapidly, and many cities and towns rose in rebellion. Provisions, money and reinforcements poured in; eventually an additional 70,000 men according to the ancient Greek historian Polybius, although many would have been tied down in garrisoning their home towns against Carthaginian retribution. The pay dispute had become a full-scale revolt. The three years of war that followed are known as the Mercenary War and threatened Carthage's existence as a state.

== Battle ==
=== Prelude ===
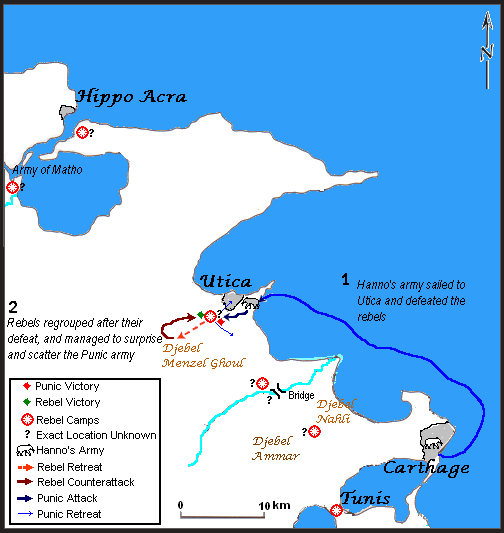
A map showing the positions of places mentioned in the text and the movements of forces, based on the hypothesis that the Carthaginians arrived at Utica by sea, see text.

Hanno, as the commander of Carthage's African army, took the field. Most of the Africans in his force remained loyal; they were accustomed to acting against their fellow Africans. His non-African contingent had remained quartered in Carthage when the army of Sicily was expelled, and also remained loyal. The few troops still in Sicily were paid up to date and redeployed with Hanno, and money was raised to hire fresh troops. An unknown number of Carthaginian citizens were incorporated into Hanno's army. By the time Hanno assembled this force, the rebels had already blockaded Utica and Hippo (modern Bizerte). It is generally supposed that Mathos was in charge of rebel operations around Hippo and Spendius of those around Utica, but this is not certain in the sources. In January or February 240 BC Hanno marched on Utica, 35 km (22 mi) north of Carthage, with his army. The modern historian Serge Lancel suggests that he sailed to the city.

=== Opposing armies ===
Carthaginian armies were nearly always composed of foreigners; citizens only served in the army if there was a direct threat to the city of Carthage. Roman sources refer to these foreign fighters derogatively as "mercenaries", but the modern classicist Adrian Goldsworthy describes this as "a gross oversimplification". They served under a variety of arrangements; for example, some were the regular troops of allied cities or kingdoms seconded to Carthage as part of formal arrangements. The majority of these foreigners were from North Africa.

Libyans provided close-order infantry equipped with large shields, helmets, short swords and long thrusting spears, as well as close-order shock cavalry carrying spears (Note: "Shock" troops are those trained and used to close rapidly with an opponent, with the intention of breaking them before or immediately upon contact.) (also known as "heavy cavalry") – both were noted for their discipline and staying power. Numidians provided light cavalry who threw javelins from a distance and avoided close combat, and javelin-armed light infantry skirmishers. Both Spain and Gaul provided experienced infantry; unarmoured troops who would charge ferociously, but had a reputation for breaking off if a combat was protracted. Specialist slingers were recruited from the Balearic Islands.

The close-order Libyan infantry and the citizen militia would fight in a tightly packed formation known as a phalanx. Sicilians and Italians had also joined up during the war to fill the ranks. The Carthaginians frequently employed war elephants; North Africa had indigenous African forest elephants at the time. (Note: These elephants were typically about 2.5-metre-high (8 ft) at the shoulder, and should not be confused with the larger African bush elephant.) The sources are not clear as to whether they carried towers containing fighting men.

Both armies are likely to have been composed of similar types and proportions of troops, except that the rebels lacked elephants. The size of the two armies is not known with certainty, but the rebel force at Utica has been estimated to have consisted of approximately 10,000 men. The Carthaginian army is thought to have been 8,000–10,000 strong and to have included 100 elephants.

=== Engagement ===
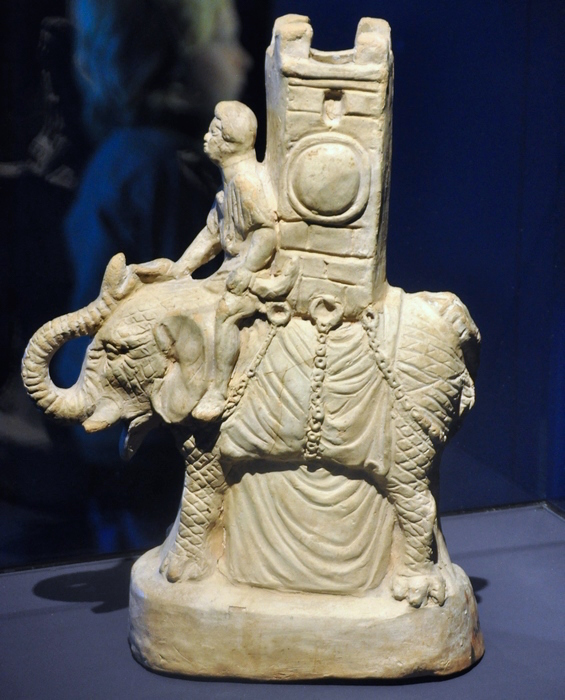
Roman statuette of a war elephant, recovered from Pompeii

The Carthaginian army approached Utica from the south east and their arrival took the rebels by surprise. The Carthaginian army set up camp outside Utica and was reinforced by the city's siege train. The fortifications of the rebel camp are believed to have been makeshift barricades, as archaeological investigations have not found any signs of trenches or ramparts. After a preliminary bombardment from the siege engines, the Carthaginians stormed the rebel's camp. The 100 Carthaginian elephants broke through the barricades, their infantry followed, and the besiegers were routed. It is possible, but not certain, that Hanno was wounded during this assault.

The Carthaginians failed to pursue the fleeing rebels, instead taking over their camp, while Hanno entered the city in triumph. Many Carthaginian soldiers proceeded to loot the rebels' baggage, dispersed to forage in the surrounding countryside or accompanied Hanno into Utica. The Carthaginians were accustomed to fighting the militias of the Numidian cities, who once broken would scatter in all directions and take days to regroup. However, the battle-hardened veterans of the Sicilian army reassembled in the nearby hills and, not being pursued, moved back to Utica. The Carthaginians were still celebrating their victory when the rebels counter-attacked, most likely the day after the Carthaginians stormed their camp or, possibly, later the same day. The Carthaginians fled, with great loss of life, losing their baggage and siege trains. The rebels in turn failed to pursue or to take advantage of their victory, possibly deterred by the Carthaginians' elephants.

== Aftermath ==
The defeat did not significantly alter the situation for Carthage. The rebels continued to besiege Utica, Hippo and Carthage. The Carthaginian field army marched away from Utica and was brought up to strength. For the rest of the year Hanno skirmished with Spendius's force, repeatedly missing opportunities to bring it to battle or to place it at a disadvantage; the military historian Nigel Bagnall writes that Hanno showed his "incompetence as a field commander". Another Carthaginian army was raised under Hamilcar in 240 BC. The two Carthaginian forces fought the rebels in a fierce and bitter campaign, wearing them down before finally defeating them at the Battle of Leptis Parva in 238 BC.

== Notes, citations and sources ==
=== Sources ===
- Bagnall, Nigel (1999). The Punic Wars: Rome, Carthage and the Struggle for the Mediterranean. London: Pimlico. ISBN 978-0-7126-6608-4.
- Eckstein, Arthur (2017). "The First Punic War and After, 264-237BC". The Encyclopedia of Ancient Battles. Wiley Online Library. pp. 1–14. doi:10.1002/9781119099000.wbabat0270. ISBN 978-1-4051-8645-2.
- Goldsworthy, Adrian (2006). The Fall of Carthage: The Punic Wars 265–146 BC. London: Phoenix. ISBN 978-0-304-36642-2.
- Hoyos, Dexter (2000). "Towards a Chronology of the 'Truceless War', 241–237 B.C.". Rheinisches Museum für Philologie. 143 (3/4): 369–380. JSTOR 41234468.
- Hoyos, Dexter (2007). Truceless War: Carthage's Fight for Survival, 241 to 237 BC. Leiden; Boston: Brill. ISBN 978-90-474-2192-4.
- Hoyos, Dexter (2015) [2011]. "Carthage in Africa and Spain, 241–218". In Hoyos, Dexter (ed.). A Companion to the Punic Wars. Chichester, West Sussex: John Wiley. pp. 204–222. ISBN 978-1-1190-2550-4.
- Jones, Archer (1987). The Art of War in the Western World. Urbana: University of Illinois Press. ISBN 978-0-252-01380-5.
- Koon, Sam (2015) [2011]. "Phalanx and Legion: the "Face" of Punic War Battle". In Hoyos, Dexter (ed.). A Companion to the Punic Wars. Chichester, West Sussex: John Wiley. pp. 77–94. ISBN 978-1-1190-2550-4.
- Lancel, Serge (1999). Hannibal. Oxford: Blackwell. ISBN 978-0-631-21848-7.
- Lazenby, John (1996). The First Punic War: A Military History. Stanford, California: Stanford University Press. ISBN 978-0-8047-2673-3.
- Miles, Richard (2011). Carthage Must be Destroyed. London: Penguin. ISBN 978-0-141-01809-6.
- Scullard, H. H. (1974). The Elephant in the Greek and Roman World. London: Thames and Hudson. ISBN 978-0-500-40025-8.
- Scullard, H. H. (2006) [1989]. "Carthage and Rome". In Walbank, F. W.; Astin, A. E.; Frederiksen, M. W. & Ogilvie, R. M. (eds.). Cambridge Ancient History: Volume 7, Part 2, 2nd Edition. Cambridge: Cambridge University Press. pp. 486–569. ISBN 978-0-521-23446-7.
- Warmington, Brian (1993) [1960]. Carthage. New York: Barnes & Noble, Inc. ISBN 978-1-56619-210-1.
