= Arch of Caracalla =

Arch of Caracalla may refer to:

- Arch of Caracalla (Volubilis)
- Arch of Caracalla (Thebeste)
- Arch of Caracalla (Djémila)
