= Autaritus =

3rd-century BCE Gallic chieftain and mercenary

- Died: 238 BCE
- Military career
- Allegiance: Carthage; Mercenary rebels
- Conflicts: First Punic War; Battle of Agrigentum; Mercenary War; Hamilcar's victory with Naravas; Battle of the Saw

Autaritus (Ancient Greek: Αὐτάριτος; died 238 BCE) was a leader of Gallic mercenaries in the Carthaginian army during the First Punic War and later became a rebel commander in the Mercenary War.

With his men Autaritus fought in 262 BCE at the Battle of Agrigentum and remained loyal to Carthage when his countrymen defected en masse to the Romans. After his return to Africa he was compelled to join the other mercenaries hired by Carthage during the war in mutinying due to the Carthaginians' inability and reluctance to pay them. He became a noted leader during the following conflict, along with Spendius and Mathos.

In 240 BCE, Autaritus led a force of Gallic infantry under Spendius during a campaign shadowing Carthaginian general Hamilcar Barca's army, which had been attacking rebel-allied towns. Unable to face the superior Carthaginian cavalry and war elephants, they instead harassed them with raids from harsher, higher terrain. Eventually, they managed to trap the Carthaginians in a narrow valley, the location of which has never been discovered, and prepared for battle. However, Naravas, a Numidian cavalry commander, defected to the Carthaginians with his 2,000 horsemen, giving Hamilcar an opportunity to escape. Despite fierce fighting, Autaritus was forced to pull his men back to Hippo.

With Autaritus' gifts as an orator and his knowledge of Phoenician, he incited his men to particular savagery. Notably, he was the instigator of the massacre of the Carthaginian commander Gisco and his men in 239 BCE, fearing that the Carthaginians' fair treatment of prisoners was causing defections like Naravas', which he hoped to dissuade by showing no such quarter. This incident caused Hamilcar Barca to subsequently offer no mercy to the rebels he faced for the rest of the conflict, leading it to be termed as the Truceless War.

Eventually Autaritus and the rebels, after several months of a series of brutal skirmishes, were forcibly maneveured by Hamilcar against a mountain range at the Battle of the Saw in 238 BCE. Despite holding out for several weeks, slowly starving and resorting to cannibalism, Spendius, Autaritus, and a rebel lieutenant called Zarzas were eventually forced to parley with Hamilcar and were taken prisoner. Together with other mercenary leaders, Autaritus was crucified before the walls of Tunis, in full view of their comrades defending the city.
