= Tebessa Basilica =

Roman basilica in Algeria

An 1860 photograph showing the basilica from the side shortly after the city of Theveste was renamed to Tebessa

The Tébessa Basilica is a Late Roman archeological site located in the eastern Algerian city of Theveste, which is known today as Tébessa. It is one of the largest remains of Roman basilicas in Northern Africa. It was dedicated to St. Crispina to honor her martyrdom in 305 CE. This basilica was originally thought to have been created as a secular building for the Roman military; it developed into a religious building as new additions were built in the 4th and 5th century.

== History ==
The Numidian region where Theveste was found became a key part of Rome's development after the fall of the Punic city of Carthage. Economic policies implemented in the Constitutional reforms of Julius Caesar created taxes on trade goods along Roman roads.

When Roman legionary camp leader Legio III Augusta came to Theveste initially, he brought with him legionary forces and other travelers. His armies constructed roads throughout Northern Africa and established the first outposts for the Roman military in Theveste. With these incoming Roman military families, Theveste grew and additional buildings were added to the structure that would become the basilica, which might have been used at that point for the collection of taxes on goods like olive oil and grain.

We have less evidence for activity in the city of Theveste after the Romans left sometime before 98 C.E. The roads that connected Carthage to Theveste and to Thamugade and Lambaesis had all been maintained and remained in good condition after other Roman roadways had suffered.

In 295 C.E., a Christian man named Maximillian was martyred at Theveste for refusing to join military service.

An inscription dated to 350 C.E. on the central niche mosaic of the basilica shrine is dedicated to Crispina, whose death took place in 305 C.E. Crispina's martyrdom would inspire pilgrimages to her shrine. This is the point where the basilica begins to gain its religious connotation.

Due to the basilica's large size it was thought at this point to have served as a xenodochium in addition to providing other services such as baptisms and other church services.

== Design ==
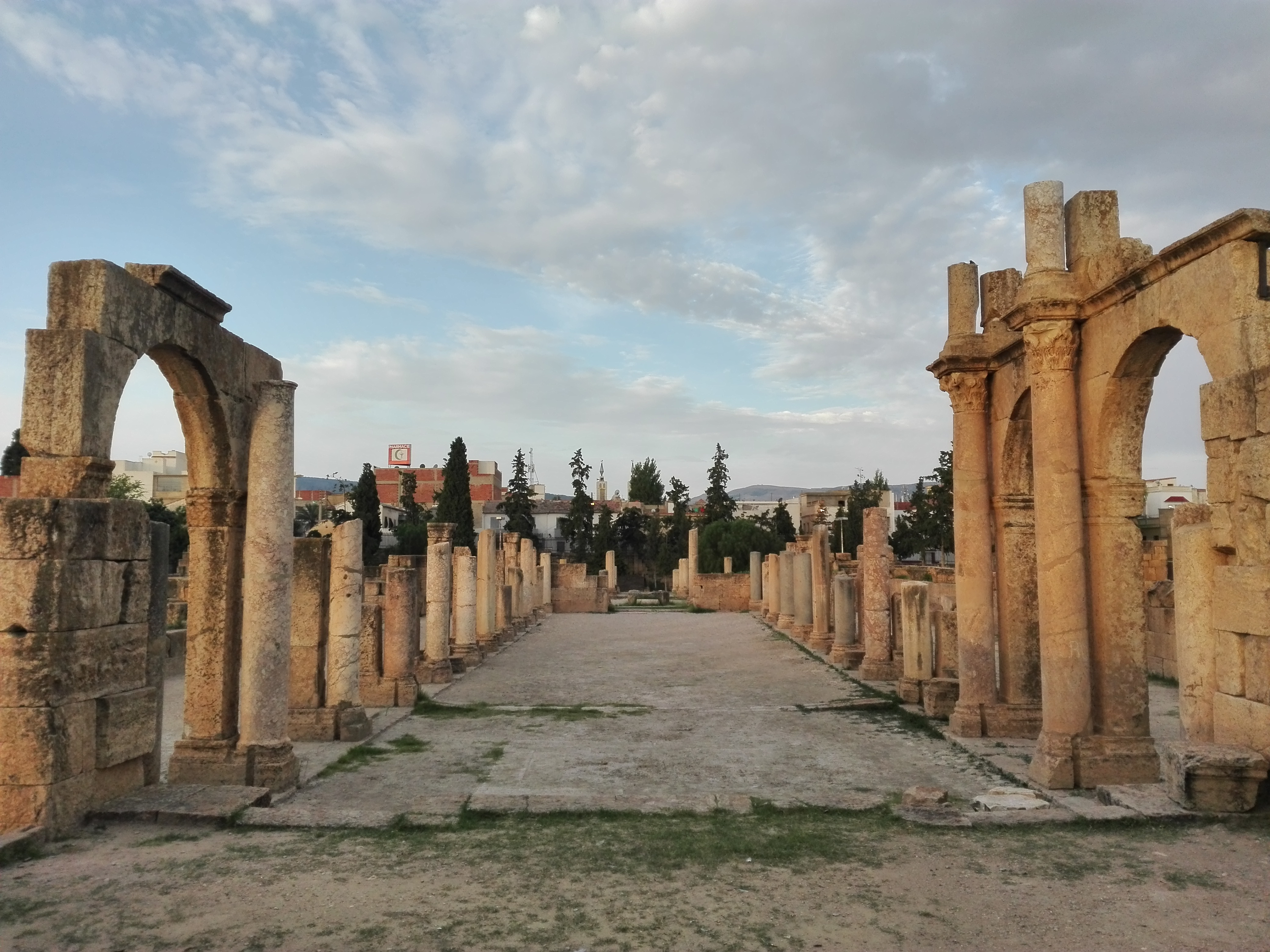
The central nave of the basilica

The basilica's large size is due to the additions and modifications made by the various Roman and Byzantine leaders in the 4th and 5th century. The mosaic floors are accented by a pathway of balustrades marking the entrance into the great forecourt of the basilica. Through the nave and aisles there is a large staircase containing 20 steps and measuring about 66 feet (20 m) wide. A massive piscina is carved into the wall leading to a large open-air atrium. In the center of the atrium is a four-lobed fountain. At this four-way intersection, three archways remain standing in the hallways leading to the large nave and aisles of the main chapel. A pair of columns support the architrave where a gallery is located. A second altar footing can be found in the main chapel nave. The baptistery sits just down a staircase from the open-air atrium. In the baptistery there is a relief carved into the floor beneath where the ceremonial font would have been placed. The scalloped design and nature of the room would also suggest that large marble table tops were used for offerings as well as alters. Like other Roman Basilicas of the early Medieval era there is evidence of galleries that would have been used to display more mobile artwork.

Additional buildings were added to the basilica complex between the 4th and 7th centuries, including a bathhouse, a garden, ground-floor stables and a martyrion. A smaller basilica was added to the complex in the 6th century.
