= Arch of Caracalla (Thebeste) =

- Thebeste
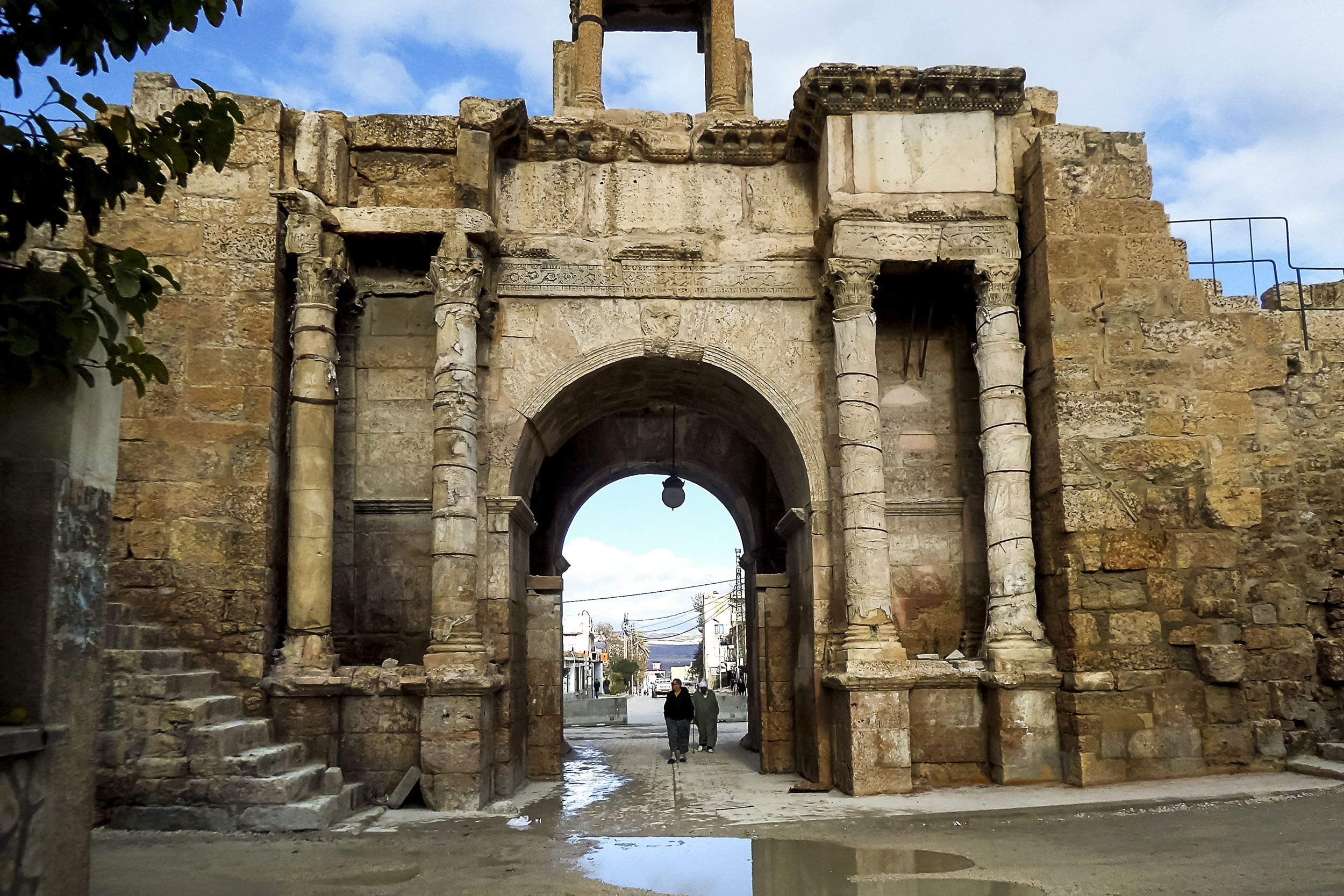
- Location: Tébessa, Algeria
- Coordinates: 35°24′17.6″N 8°7′22.1″E
- Type: Roman triumphal arch
- Dedicated to: Emperor Caracalla

The Arch of Caracalla is a tetrapylon Roman triumphal arch in Thebeste, located in present-day Tébessa, Tébessa Province, Algeria. It was constructed during the early 3rd century.

== History ==
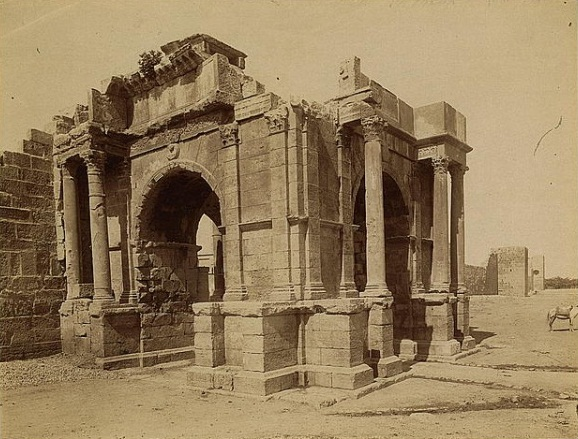
Caracalla arch, 1860–1890

The arch was built between 211 and 214 by means of a testamentary donation of Gaius Cornelius Egrilianus, Prefect of the XIV legion, who was originally from Thebeste. The figure set aside for the construction was 250,000 sesterti.

Later, the arch was reused as the northern gate of the city wall in the Byzantine period. The lateral arches were walled up, as was the northern one, until they were reopened by French military engineers during the colonial period.

== Description ==
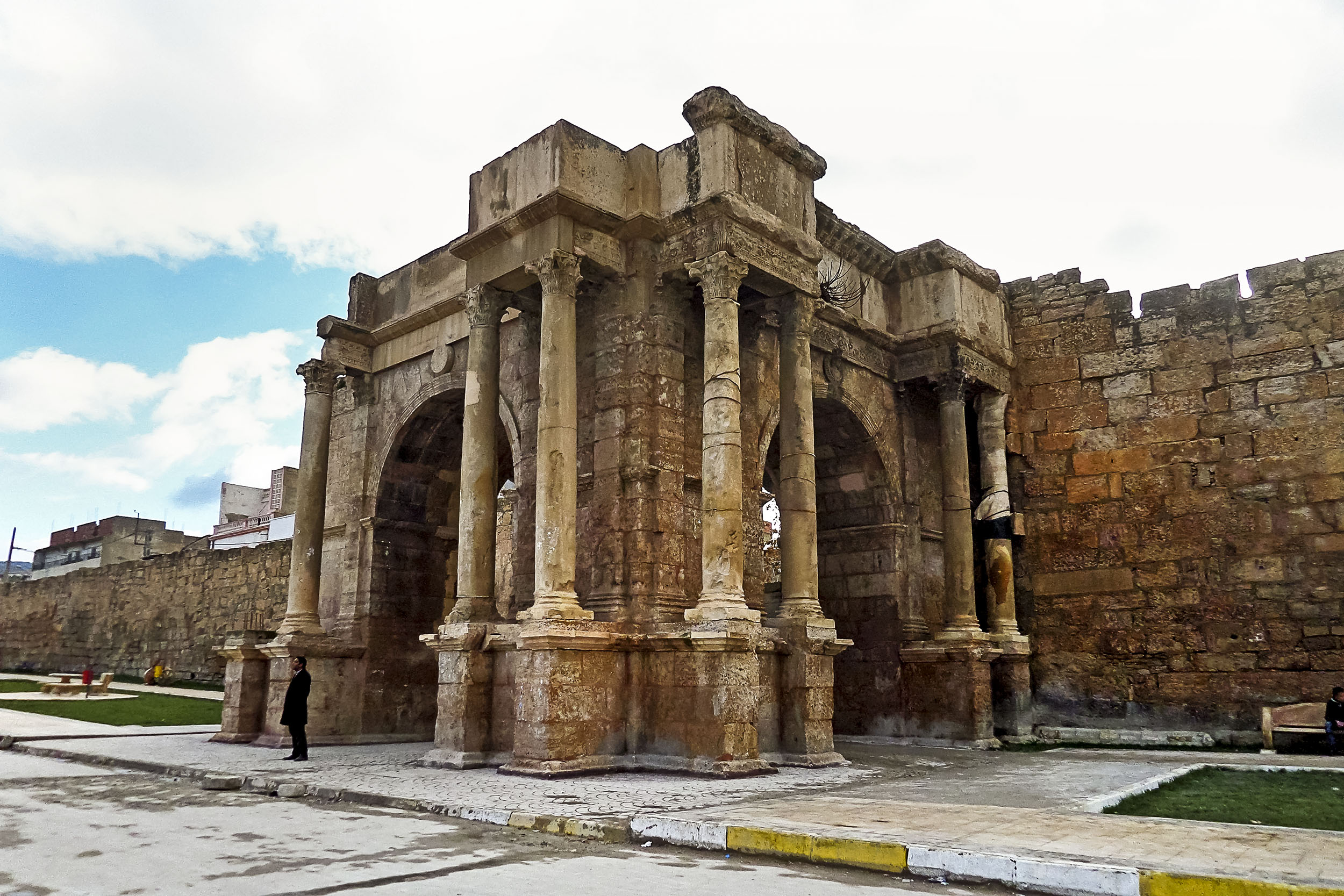
Arch of Caracalla at Thebeste

In form, the Arch of Caracalla is roughly cubical, being 10.94m on the side and to the top of the entablature. On the pylons, beside the spans are pairs of columns with Corinthian capitals, detached from the wall and with pilasters behind, supported by a podium from which their pedestals extend. The main entablature is above the pairs of columns and continues in the recess above the spans. Medallions with the busts of divinities are located above each of the spans.

On the attic on three sides dedications are inscribed to the deified Emperor Septimius Severus, Julia Domna and Caracalla. On the fourth side is a reconstructed Byzantine inscription, originally found in the infill of the vaults, which refers to the incorporation of the arch into the Byzantine city wall as the work of the magister militum Solomon.

At the centre on all sides, the entablature supported an aedicula which held a statue.

The reconstruction of the very top of the arch is the subject of some debate among scholars: According to Meunier an octagonal lantern would have stood there with its base hidden by the aediculae, while according to another there would have been a low dome. According to Bacchielli, the four aediculae, connected by railings contained the statues of the Deified Septimius Severus, the Deified Julia Domna, Caracalla and Geta.

== See also ==
- Arch of Caracalla (Djémila)
- List of Roman triumphal arches

== Bibliography ==
- Jean Meunier, "L'arc de Caracalla à Théveste (Tébessa). Relevé et restitution", in Revue africaine, 82, 1938, pp. 84–106.
- Silvio Accame, "Il testamento di C. Cornelio Egriliano e l'arco di Caracalla in Tébessa", in Epigrahica, 3, 1941, pp. 237–243.
- Umberto Ciotti, "Del coronamento degli archi quadrifronti. I. Gli archi di Tébessa e di Tripoli", in Bullettino della commissione archeologica comunale di Roma, 72, 1946–1948, pp. 21–42.
- Pietro Romanelli, "Theveste", in Enciclopedia dell'arte antica 1966 (testo on line sul sito Treccani.it.)
- Lidiano Bacchielli, "Il testamento di C. Cornelio Egriliano e il coronamento dell'arco di Caracalla a Tebessa", in L'Africa romana. Atti del IV convegno di studio (Sassari, 12-14 dicembre 1986), Sassari 1987, pp. 295–321.
- Silvio De Maria, "Arco onorario e trionfale", in Enciclopedia dell'arte antica. II supplemento, 1994 (copy online on the site Treccani.it
- Enrico Zanini, "Tebessa", in Enciclopedia dell'arte medievale, 2000 (testo on line sul sito Treccani.it).
