= Arch of Caracalla (Djémila) =

3rd-century Roman triumphal arch at Djémila in Algeria (Cuicul)

- Cuicul
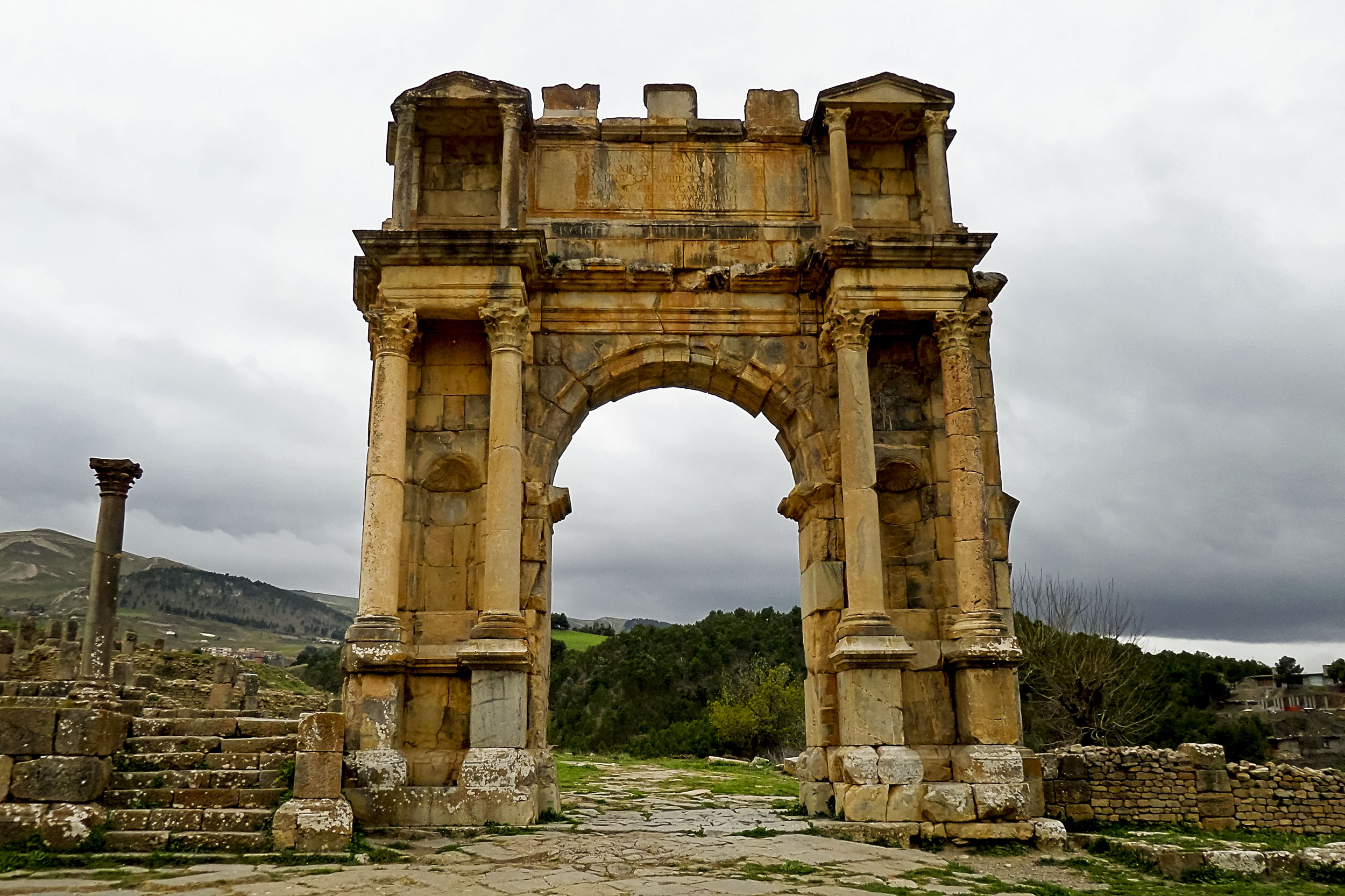
- 36°19′14.1″N 5°44′8″E
- Location: Djémila, Algeria
- Type: Roman triumphal arch
- Dedicated to: Emperor Caracalla

The Arch of Caracalla is a Roman triumphal arch located at Djémila in Algeria (Cuicul). It was built during the early 3rd century. The arch, with a single span (fornix), was placed on the road leading to Sitifis. It constituted the entrance to the city's Severan forum.

== History ==
The arch was erected in 216 in honour of the Emperor Caracalla, his mother Julia Domna, and his deceased father Septimius Severus.

In 1839, Prince Ferdinand Philippe, Duke of Orléans saw the arch during an expedition and planned to have it transported to Paris, where he intended to have it erected with the inscription "L'Armée d'Afrique à la France" (The Army of Africa, to France). After his death, in 1842, the project, which was almost ready to be carried out, was abandoned.

The arch, together with the rest of the archaeological site of Djémila, has been included in the UNESCO list of World Heritage Sites since 1982.

== Description ==
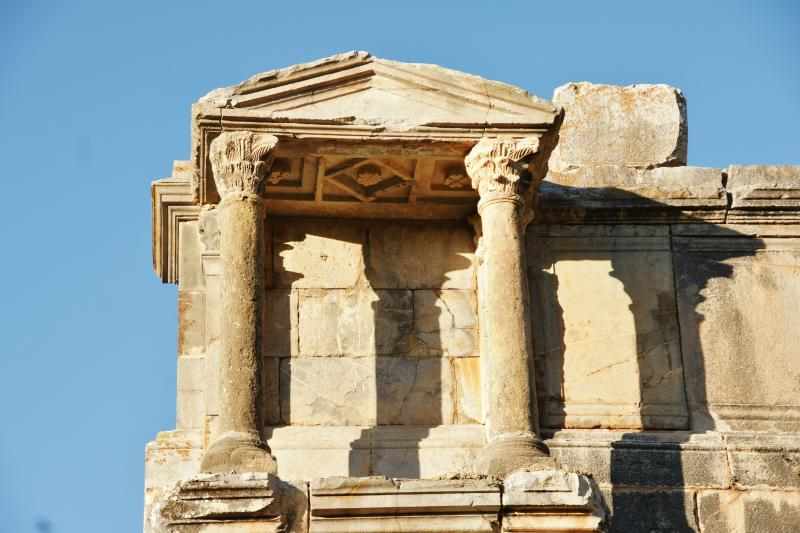
Part of the Arch of Caracalla at Djémila.

The arch, with a single span, reaches a height of 12.5 m, a width on 11.6 m and a depth of 3.9 m.

On both sides of the span on the pylons are niches, each framed by a pair of Corinthian columns on pedestals, with smooth drums, detached from the wall. Each pair of columns supports an entablature, which is surmounted in turn by a small aedicula, with a pediment, reaching to the top of the attic.

On top of the attic, three bases remain, which originally supported statues of the members of the imperial family.

== See also ==
- List of Roman triumphal arches
- Arch of Caracalla (Thebeste)

== Bibliography ==
- Pietro Romanelli, "Gemila" in Enciclopedia dell'arte antica (1960) (testo on line)
- Paul Fevrier, "Notes sur le développement urbain en Afrique du Nord. Les exemples comparés de Djemila et de Sétif", in Cahiers d'archéologie, 14, 1964, p. 9.
- Silvio De Maria, "Arco onorario e trionfale" in Enciclopedia dell'arte antica. II supplemento (1994)
