= Tébessa =

Tebessa تبسة
- City
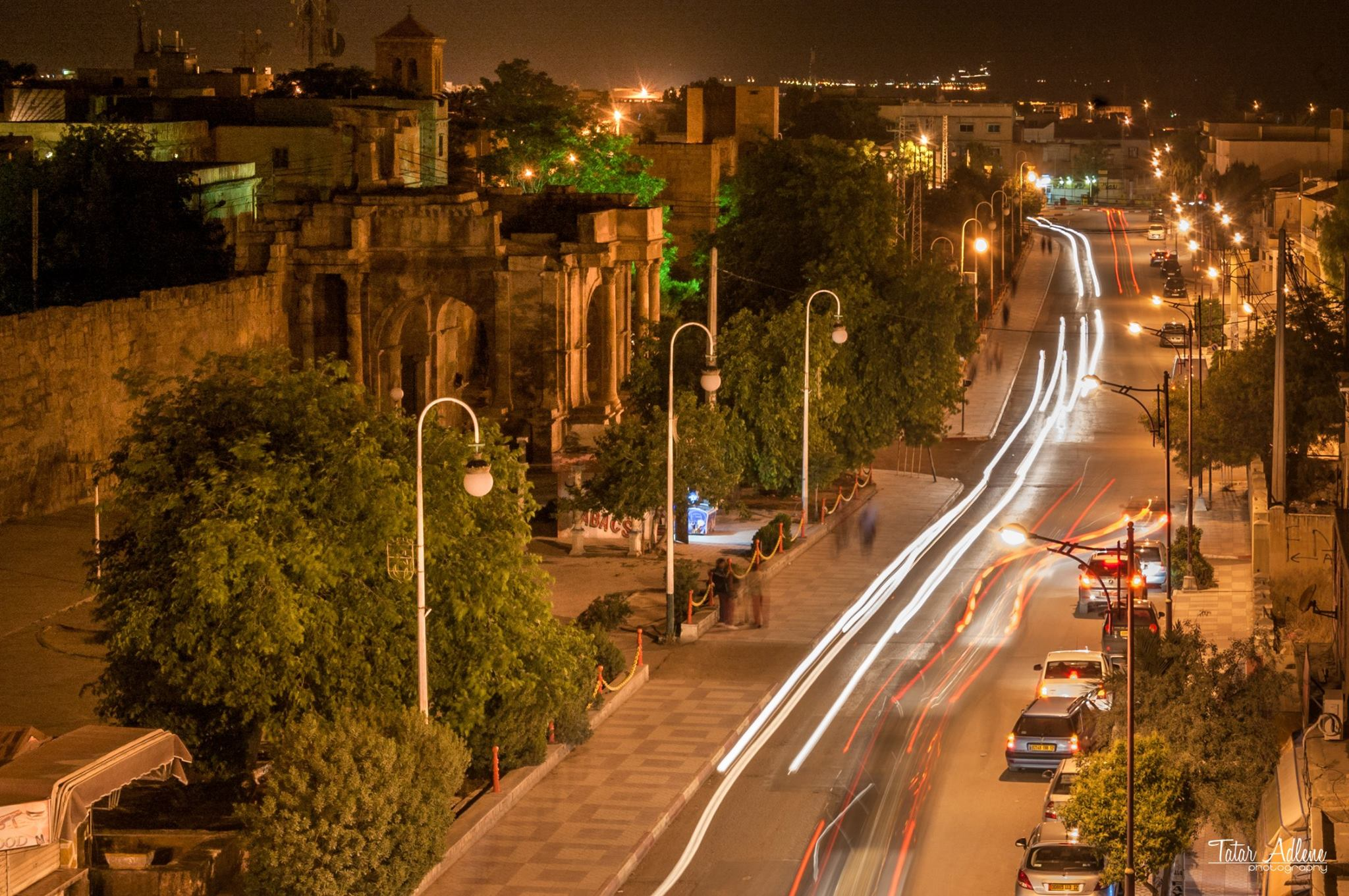
- Tebessa

- Location within Algeria
- Coordinates: 35°24′N 8°7′E
- Country: Algeria
- Province: Tébessa Province
- District: Tebessa

Area
  - Total: 14,227 km^{2} (5,493 sq mi)
- Elevation: 858 m (2,815 ft)

Population (2008)
  - Total: 196,537
  - Density: 13.814/km^{2} (35.779/sq mi)
- Time zone: UTC+1 (CET)
- Climate: BSk

Tébessa or Tebessa (Arabic: تبسة Tibissa or Tbessa), the classical Theveste, is the capital city of Tébessa Province in northeastern Algeria, near the border with Tunisia. It hosts several historical landmarks, the most notable being the wall that surrounds the city and its gates. The city is also known for its traditional Algerian carpets. Tébessa was home to over 190,000 people in 2007.

== Name ==
Tebessa, written Tébessa in French, was known to the ancient Greeks as Thebéstē (Θεβέστη) or Hekatompýlē (Ἑκατομπύλη, 'Hundred Gates'). This was Latinized as Theveste.

== History ==
In antiquity, Theveste formed part of the Roman Republic.

After the establishment of the Roman Empire, the 3rd Augustan Legion was based in Theveste before being transferred to Lambaesis. Theveste later became a Roman colony, probably under Trajan in the early 2nd century. At the time of Trajan it was a flourishing city with around 30,000 inhabitants. The ruins surviving in present-day Tebessa are very rich in ancient monuments, among them being the Arch of Caracalla, Roman triumphal arch, a Roman temple, and a Christian basilica from the 4th century.

There is mention of a council held there by the Donatists. Among its saints were its bishop Lucius, who assisted at the 256 Council of Carthage and died as a martyr two years later; Maximilianus, martyred on 12 March 295; and Crispina, martyred on 5 December 304. Some of its other bishops are known: Romulus in 349; Urbicus in 411; Felix exiled by the Vandals in 484; Palladius mentioned in an inscription.

During the 4th and 5th centuries, Theveste was a hotbed of Manichaeism as well. In June 1918, a Latin codex of 26 leaves written by the Manichaeans was discovered in a cave near the city. A month later, Henri Omont found its other 13 initial leaves. The whole book is now known as the Tebessa codex and is kept in Cologne. It has been edited by Markus Stein.

Theveste was rebuilt and incorporated into Byzantine North Africa by the patrician Solomon at the beginning of the reign of Justinian I. Solomon built his own tomb in Theveste, which still exists.

In the 7th century, the Muslim conquest reduced Theveste in importance but did not completely destroy it. In the 11th century, Banu Hilal, an Arab tribe originally living between the Nile and Red Sea, settled in Tripolitania, Tunisia, and Constantinois (the area around Constantine and Tebessa).

During the 16th century, the Ottoman Empire established a small garrison of Janissaries in Tebessa.

In 1851, the town was occupied by the French. It became the capital of its canton, then an arrondissement of the department of Constantine in Algeria. Later, its arrondissement was moved to the department of Bône. After Algerian independence, it became the capital of its own eponymous province.

=== Main sights ===
- Arch of Caracalla, a Roman triumphal arch (AD 214).
- Roman theater
- Temple of Minerva (early 3rd century AD), with walls decorated by mosaics.
- Amphitheatre (4th century AD)
- Remains of the basilica of St. Crispina (4th century AD), one of the biggest in Africa. It was partially destroyed by Berbers, and rebuilt in 535 by the Byzantine general Solomon. It has chapels, baptism urns, catacombs, and gardens, and a tessellated pavement.
- Byzantine walls (6th century), popularly known as "Solomon's Walls" and flanked by thirteen square towers.
- Archaeological museum.

== Geography ==
=== Climate ===
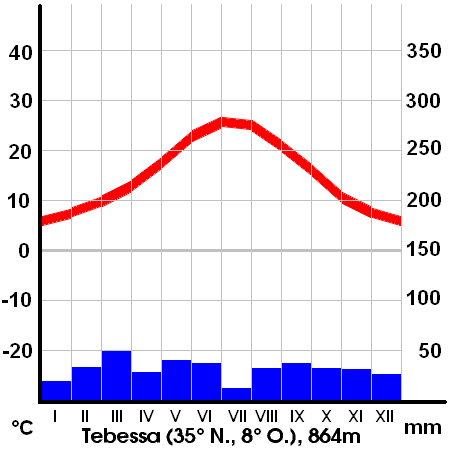
Climate in Tebessa

Tébessa has a humid subtropical climate (Köppen climate classification Cfa), with hot, fairly dry summers and mild, somewhat wetter winters.

Climate data for Tébessa
Month	Jan	Feb	Mar	Apr	May	Jun	Jul	Aug	Sep	Oct	Nov	Dec	Year
Record high °C (°F)	24.0 (75.2)	30.1 (86.2)	32.0 (89.6)	32.4 (90.3)	40.6 (105.1)	41.3 (106.3)	45.2 (113.4)	43.0 (109.4)	40.0 (104.0)	37.3 (99.1)	31.0 (87.8)	27.0 (80.6)	45.2 (113.4)
Mean daily maximum °C (°F)	12.2 (54.0)	13.3 (55.9)	16.3 (61.3)	20.9 (69.6)	24.6 (76.3)	29.9 (85.8)	32.6 (90.7)	30.7 (87.3)	25.9 (78.6)	22.0 (71.6)	17.4 (63.3)	12.6 (54.7)	21.5 (70.8)
Daily mean °C (°F)	6.5 (43.7)	7.3 (45.1)	9.8 (49.6)	13.0 (55.4)	17.4 (63.3)	21.7 (71.1)	25.0 (77.0)	23.8 (74.8)	19.1 (66.4)	15.3 (59.5)	10.6 (51.1)	7.0 (44.6)	14.7 (58.5)
Mean daily minimum °C (°F)	0.8 (33.4)	1.3 (34.3)	3.0 (37.4)	5.1 (41.2)	10.2 (50.4)	13.5 (56.3)	17.4 (63.3)	16.7 (62.1)	12.3 (54.1)	8.6 (47.5)	2.8 (37.0)	1.4 (34.5)	7.8 (46.0)
Record low °C (°F)	−14.7 (5.5)	−12.8 (9.0)	−8.0 (17.6)	−5.8 (21.6)	−1.2 (29.8)	5.4 (41.7)	8.0 (46.4)	5.6 (42.1)	−2.0 (28.4)	−5.1 (22.8)	−12.3 (9.9)	−14.0 (6.8)	−14.7 (5.5)
Average precipitation mm (inches)	28.7 (1.13)	34.5 (1.36)	56.8 (2.24)	47.3 (1.86)	38.4 (1.51)	24.2 (0.95)	20.2 (0.80)	32.1 (1.26)	60.8 (2.39)	58.5 (2.30)	51.6 (2.03)	42.7 (1.68)	495.8 (19.51)
Average precipitation days (≥ 1 mm)	8.4	9.1	10.8	8.9	6.4	3.8	2.7	5.9	6.3	7.2	7.3	7.9	84.7
Average relative humidity (%)	75.1	70.8	65.0	64.1	58.7	49.6	43.9	48.3	61.6	64.9	72.2	74.7	62.4
Mean monthly sunshine hours	161.2	206.2	248.0	240.0	310.0	306.0	381.3	328.6	282.0	223.2	183.0	164.3	3,033.8
Mean daily sunshine hours	5.2	7.3	8.0	8.0	10.0	10.2	12.3	10.6	9.4	7.2	6.1	5.3	8.3
Source 1: NOAA (precipitation 1991-2020)
Source 2: climatebase.ru (extremes, humidity) Arab Meteorology Book (sun)

== Economy ==
The city commands the entire southeastern region of eastern Algeria and is a key point on the Annaba - El Oued border axis.

Tébessa Province has many phosphate mines, including the Djebel Onk mine. It also has several industrial units.

== Transportation ==
Tébessa is connected by road and rail with the other parts of both Algeria and Tunisia. It is served by Tébessa Airport for air transport.
