= Crispina of Numidia =

Roman martyr and saint

Saint Crispina
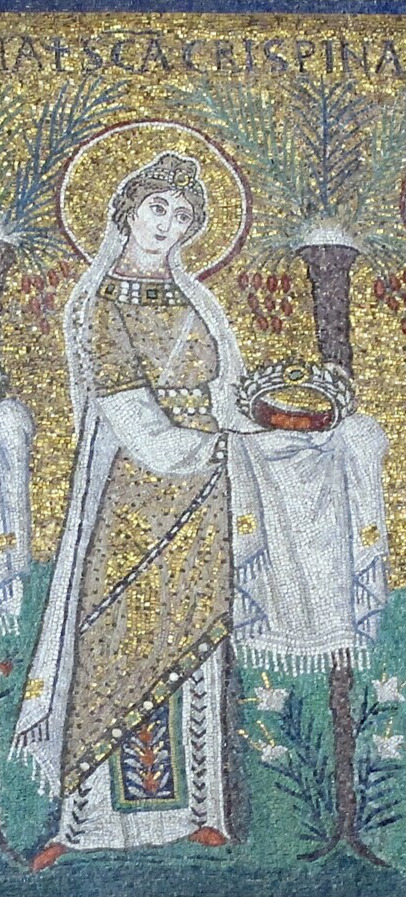
- Mosaic from the Basilica of Sant'Apollinare Nuovo

Virgin martyr
- Born: Third century
- Died: December 5, 304; Theveste in Numidia
- Venerated in: Eastern Orthodox Church; Roman Catholic Church
- Feast: 5 December

Crispina (died 5 December, 304) was a virgin martyr of Africa who suffered during the Diocletian persecution. She was born at Thagora, a town in the Roman province of Numidia, located in Taoura, Algeria. (The Tabula Peutingeriana calls it Thacora) in North Africa.) She died by beheading at Theveste, in Numidia.

== Biography ==
Crispina belonged to a distinguished family and was a wealthy matron with children. At the time of the persecution she was brought before the proconsul Annius Anullinus; on being ordered to sacrifice to the gods she declared she honored only one God. When threatened with death, Crispina replied: “I care not for the present life, and am only anxious for the life of my soul. I fear eternal torments only.” Her head was shaved at the command of the judge, and she was exposed to public mockery, but she remained steadfast in her faith and was not moved even by the tears of her children. When condemned to death, she thanked God and offered her head with joy for execution.

The Acts of her martyrdom, written not long after the event, form a valuable historical document of the period of the persecution. The day of Crispina's death was observed in the time of Augustine of Hippo; in his sermons Augustine repeatedly mentions her name, as well known in Africa and worthy to be held in the same veneration of Agnes of Rome and Thecla. In his Sermon on Psalm 120, Augustine says: "The persecutors turned their rage against Crispina, whose birthday we celebrate today. They unleashed their savagery against a rich woman delicately nurtured; but she was strong, because the Lord was for her a better defense than the hand of her right hand, and He was guarding her. Is there anyone in Africa who does not know about these events, brothers and sisters? Scarcely, for she was extremely famous, of noble stock and very wealthy."

Thierry Ruinart in his collection of the Acts of the martyrs gives the account of her examination. Alphonsus Liguori provided a version of these acts in his Victories of the Martyrs.

== Commemoration ==
C. 400 AD, Crispina's grave, situated in a cemetery outside Theveste, had become a significant pilgrimage complex enclosed by a wall. At its center stood a large church, elevated on a high podium and accompanied by an atrium. Access to a smaller trefoil chapel, dedicated to Crispina and located three meters below, was available from the church. To the west of the church was an area divided into four sections, likely shallow pools, bordered by low walls and flanked by pilasters along the paths. Additionally, there was a porticoed structure, identified as stables, situated further to the west.

== Sources ==
- Liguori, Alphonsus. Victories of the Martyrs., 1776.
- Schiavo, Anthony P. I Am A Christian: Authentic Accounts of Christian Martyrdom and Persecution from the Ancient Sources, Merchantville, NJ: Arx Publishing, 2018. (Includes an English translation of the Passion of Saint Crispina as recounted by Alphonsus Liguori based on the ancient Acts of Saint Crispina): ISBN 978-1-935228-18-9

=== Videography ===
- The Passion of Saint Crispina, Roman North African Martyr of AD 304 (2018) – Excerpt.
