= Hanno II the Great =

3rd century BCE Carthaginian statesman and general

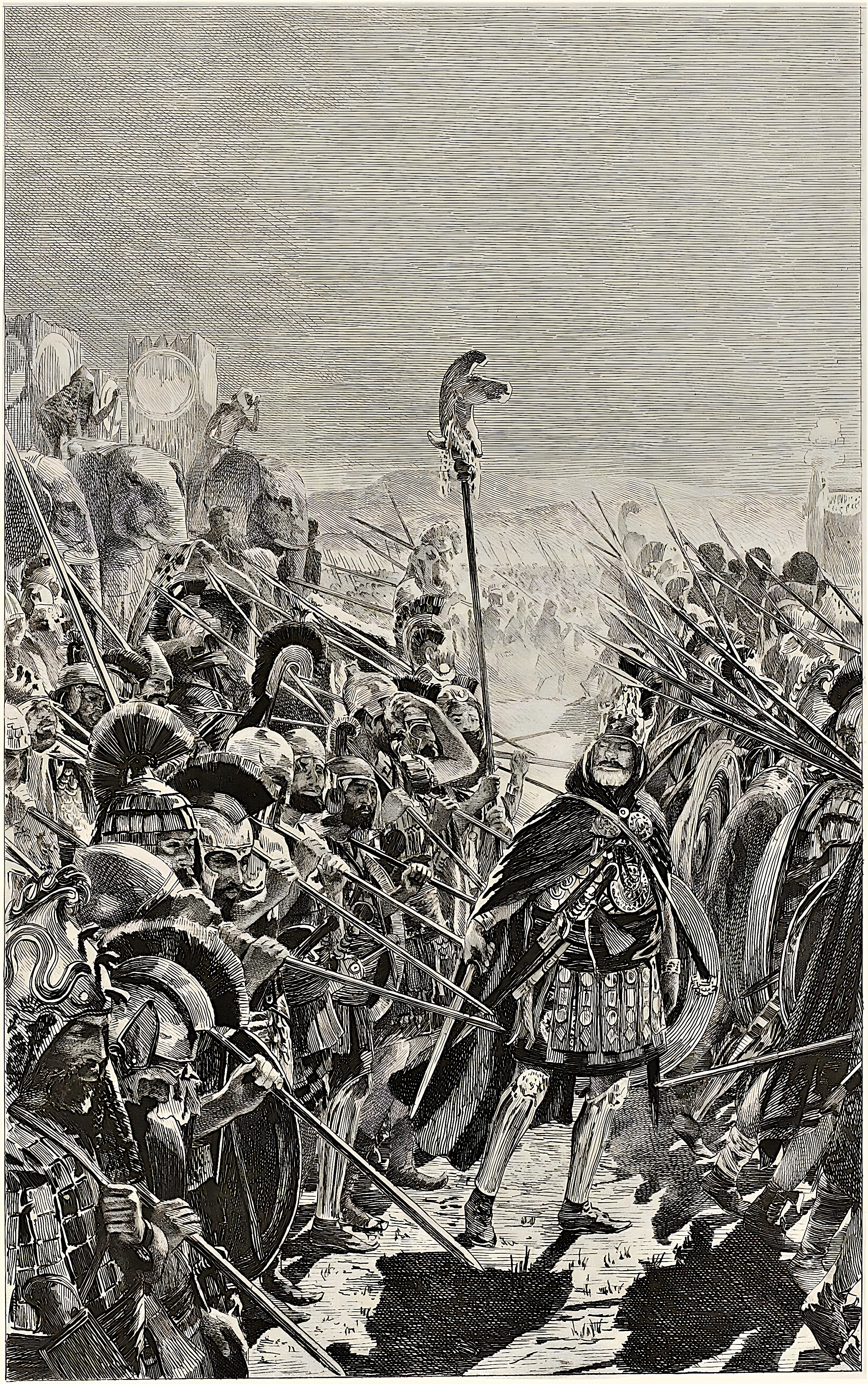
Hanno commands his army in the leadup of the Battle of Utica, as envisaged by Georges Rochegrosse and Eugène-André Champollion.

Hanno II the "Great" (Punic: 𐤇𐤍𐤀, ḥnʾ) was a wealthy Carthaginian aristocrat in the 3rd century BC. He is the most well-known political opponent of the Barcid family; first Hamilcar and later Hannibal Barca.

Hanno's wealth was based on the land he owned in the Maghreb and the Iberian Peninsula, and during the First Punic War he led the faction in Carthage that was opposed to continuing the war against the Roman Republic. He preferred to continue conquering territory in the Maghreb rather than fight a naval war against Rome that would bring him no personal gain. In these efforts, he was opposed by the Carthaginian general Hamilcar Barca. In 247 BC Hanno conquered the city of Theveste (nicknamed: Hekatompylos) after which he negotiated a peace settlement with the Numidians ending Carthage's war with the Numidians. He was praised by both parties for the fairness of the treaty. Hanno demobilized the Carthaginian navy in 244 BC, giving Rome time to rebuild its navy and finally defeat Carthage by 241 BC. After the war, Hanno refused to pay the Berber mercenaries who had been promised money and rewards by Hamilcar. The mercenaries revolted, and Hanno took control of the Carthaginian army to attempt to defeat them. His attempt failed and he gave control of the army back to Hamilcar. Eventually, they both cooperated to crush the rebels in 238 BC.

His nickname "the Great" was apparently earned because of his conquests among the Berber enemies of Carthage, and he continued to oppose war with Rome, which would necessarily involve naval engagements. During the Second Punic War, he led the anti-war faction in Carthage, and is blamed for preventing reinforcements from being sent to Hamilcar's son Hannibal after his victory at the Battle of Cannae. After Carthage's defeat at the Battle of Zama in 202 BC, he was among the ambassadors to negotiate peace with the Romans.

== Bibliography ==
- Charles-Picard, Gilbert; Picard, Colette. Life and Death of Carthage. Taplinger, 1968.
- Hoyos, Dexter. The Carthaginians. Routledge, 2010.
- Hoyos, Dexter. Master the West: Rome and Carthage at War. Oxford University Press, 2015.
- Hoyos, Dexter. Carthage's Other Wars: Carthaginian Warfare Outside the 'Punic Wars' Against Rome. Pen & Sword, 2019.
- Huss, Werner. Geschichte der Karthager. C.H. Beck, 1985. ISBN 9783406306549
