= Serge Lancel =

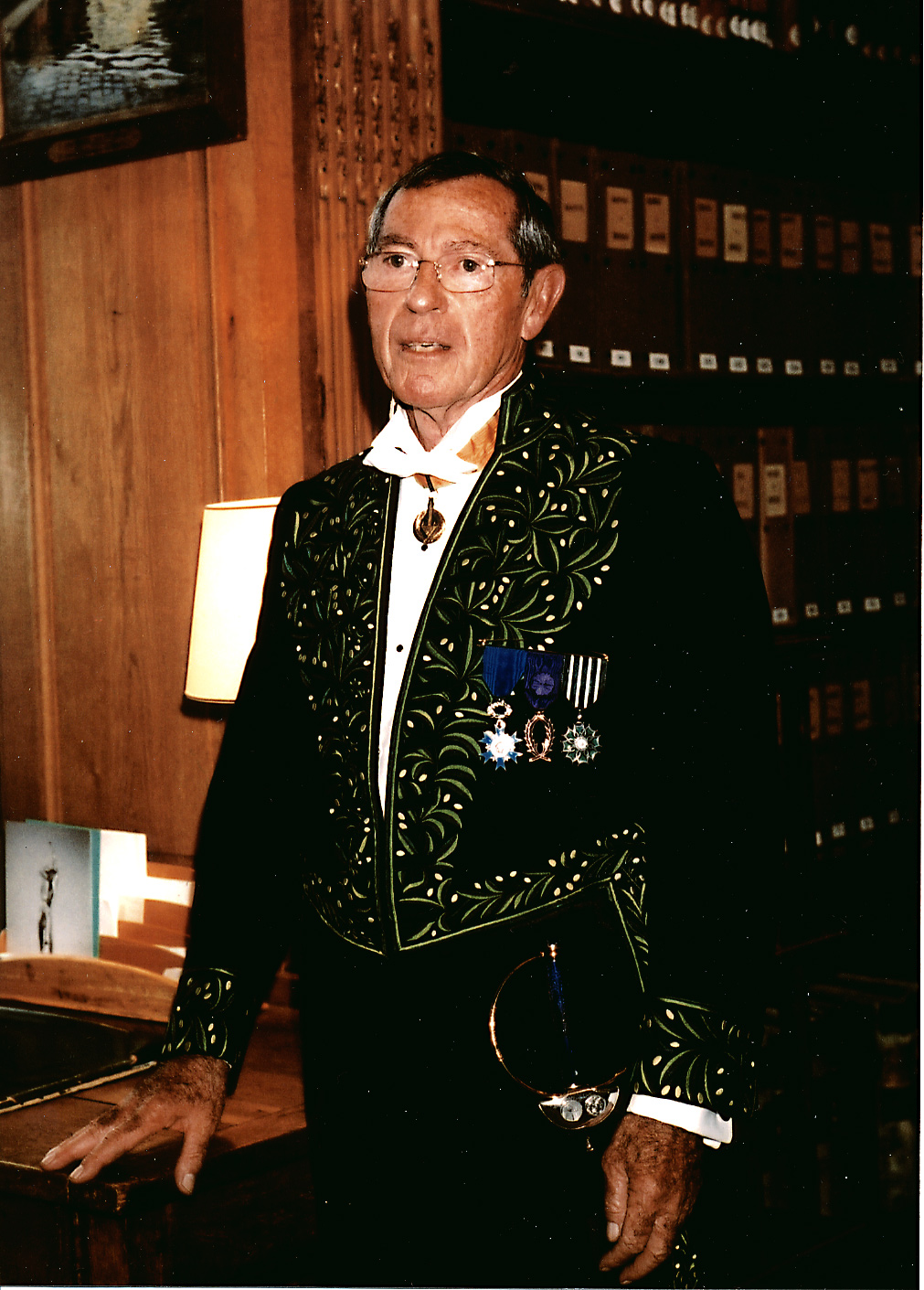
- Serge Lancel on the day of his reception at the Académie des Inscriptions et Belles Lettres
- Born: 5 September 1928; San Miguel del Padrón, Havana, Cuba
- Died: 9 October 2005 (aged 77); Grenoble
- Occupations: Archaeologist; Philologist; Historian

Serge Lancel (5 September 1928 – 9 October 2005) was a French archaeologist, historian and philologist.

== Publications ==
- Tipasa de Maurétanie, éd. Ministère de l'Éducation nationale, Algiers, 1966
- Verrerie antique de Tipasa, éd. De Bocard, Paris, 1967
- Actes de la conférence de Carthage en 411, 4 tomes, coll. Sources chrétiennes, éd. du Cerf, Paris, 1972-1991
- [sous la dir.] Byrsa I. Mission archéologique française à Carthage, éd. INAA, Tunis / éd. École française de Rome, Rome, 1979
- [sous la dir.] Byrsa II. Mission archéologique française à Carthage, éd. INAA, Tunis / éd. École française de Rome, Rome, 1982 ISBN 2728300372
- Introduction à la connaissance de Carthage. La colline de Byrsa à l'époque punique, éd. Recherches sur les civilisations, 1983
- Carthage, Paris, éd. Fayard, 1992 ISBN 2213028389
- Hannibal, Paris, éd. Fayard, 1995 ISBN 221359550X
- Saint Augustin, Paris, éd. Fayard, 1999 ISBN 2213602824
- Pax et concordia : chrétiens des premiers siècles en Algérie (IIIe}-VIIe siècles) with Paul Mattei, éd. Marsa, Paris, 2001
- L'Algérie antique. De Massinissa à saint Augustin, éd. Mengès, Paris, 2003 ISBN 285620421X
- Une saison en Numidie, éd. Tchou, Paris, 2007
