= Theveste =

Roman colony in present Algeria

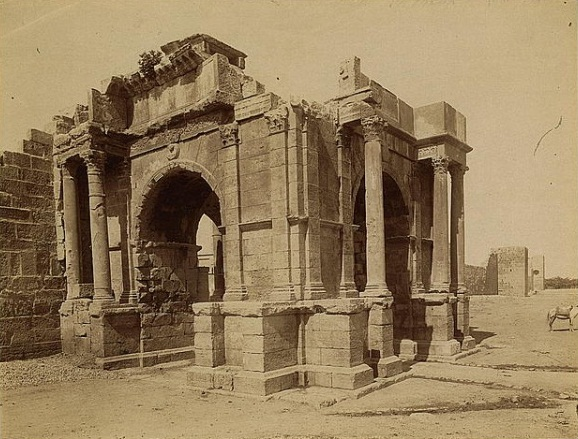
- Arch of Caracalla in Theveste

- Location within Algeria
- 35.4°N 8.116667°E
- Location: Algeria
- Region: Tébessa Province

Theveste was a Roman colony situated in what is now Tébessa, Algeria.

== History ==
In 146 BC, the Romans conquered the region, where existed an old city called "Tbessa". Theveste was founded by the Romans in 75 AD near an old Berber village located next to the Aurès Mountains, in order to control the mountain region.

During the 1st century CE, the Legio III Augusta resided there before being transferred to Lambaesis. It was made a colonia probably under Trajan.

Theveste flourished under Septimius Severus reaching a population calculated in nearly 30,000 inhabitants, and was even an important Dioceses See.

There is mention of a council held there by the Donatists. Among its saints were Lucius, its bishop, who assisted at the Council of Carthage (256) and died as a martyr two years later; Maximilianus, martyred 12 March, 295 AD; and Crispina, martyred 5 December, 304 AD. By 400 AD, Crispina's grave, situated in a cemetery outside the town, had become a significant pilgrimage complex.

Some of its bishops are known: Romulus in 349 AD; Urbicus in 411 AD; Felix exiled by the Vandals in 484 AD; and Palladius mentioned in an inscription.

During the 4th and 5th century AD, Thebeste was a centre of Manichaeism as well. In June 1918 a codex of 26 leaves written in Latin by Manichaeans was discovered in a cave near the city.

Theveste was raided by the Vandals, but it was rebuilt and made part of Byzantine North Africa at the beginning of the reign of Justinian I by the patricius Solomon. He erected a tomb there, which still exists. The city was nearly destroyed by Umayyad Caliphate forces, but a small village (probably initially populated by a few surviving Christian Berbers) remained for centuries.

Modern Tebessa is very rich in ancient monuments, among them being a triumphal arch of Caracalla, a temple, a Christian basilica of the 4th century and the huge walls.

== Main architectural remains ==
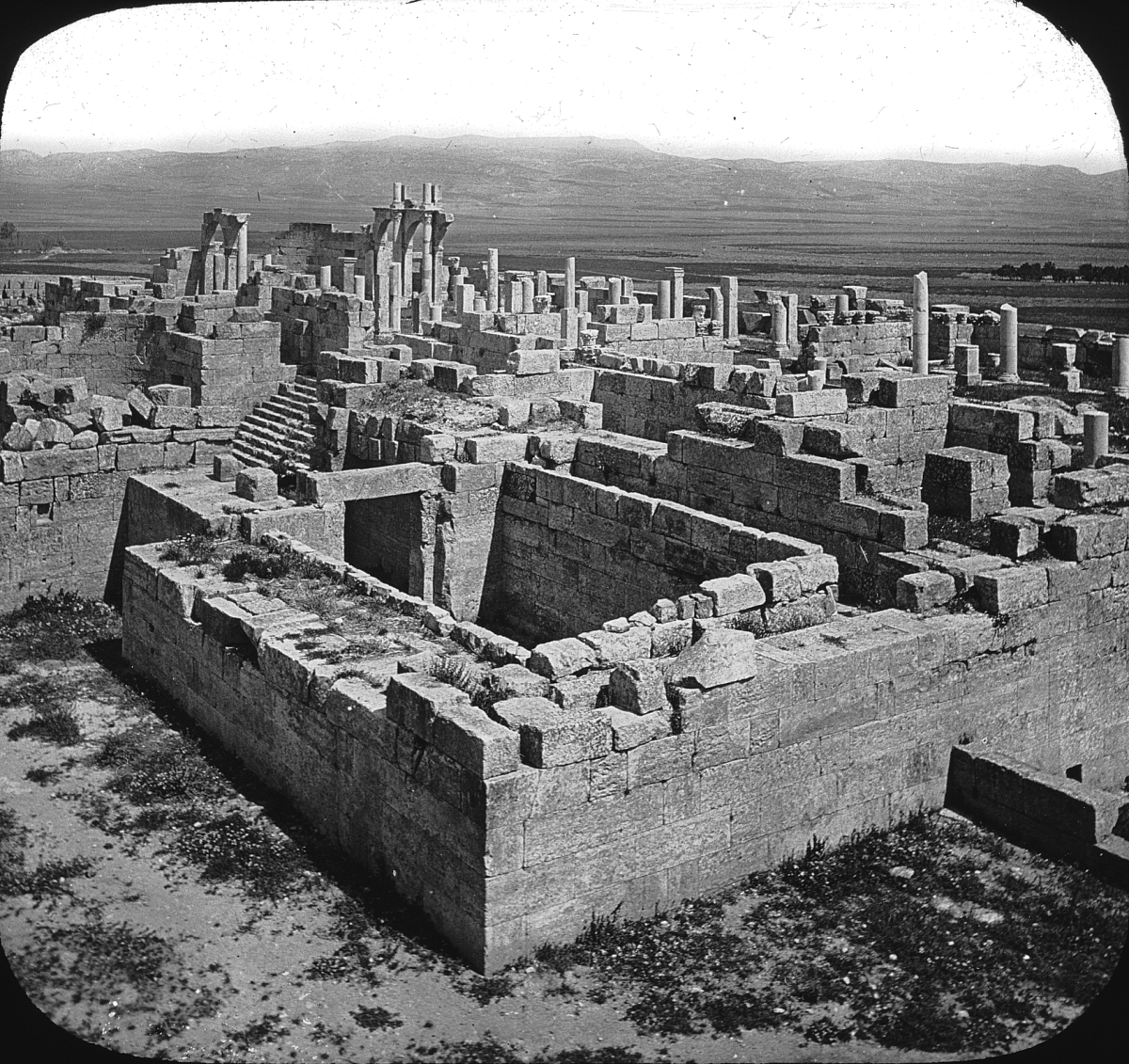
The Roman Forum of Theveste

Around the Roman Forum it is possible to see even today the remains of:

- Arch of Caracalla, a Roman triumphal arch dating from 214 AD. This edifice, which was the North entrance to the town is positioned as a square at the junction of two roads. The four facades of this door are all identical.
- Temple of Minerva (early 3rd century AD), with walls decorated by mosaics. The Minerva Temple dates from the beginning of the 3rd Century. The interior walls of this Temple are ornamented with beautiful mosaics. One finds inside it various prehistoric articles (money, arms, lamps, etc.)
- Remains of the Basilica of St. Crispinus (4th century AD), one of the biggest in Africa. It also has chapels, baptism urns, catacombs and gardens. The basilica is situated at the exterior of the old city at the north of the Arc of Caracalla. There are various pathways, huge steps, stables, walkways, and many Roman edifices around. This basilica is consecrated to a local Saint, Crispina of Numidia, and dates from the end of the 4th Century.
- Byzantine walls (6th century), popularly known as "Solomon's Walls" and flanked by thirteen square towers. The Solomon wall encircles the old town centre. These walls are flanked by towers which open onto the outside by four doors. One of these four doors is an Arc de Triomphe (Caracalla's door).
- Roman theatre. Small in size, it was created when the city was refounded as a base for the Legio III Augusta.
- Amphitheatre (4th century AD). Divided into two sections.
- Roman aqueduct. Still partially working.

Theveste was located 170 km southeast of Cirta (modern-day Constantine)

== See also ==
- Arch of Caracalla in Theveste
- Mauretania Caesariensis
- Hippo Regius
- Cirta
- Thagaste

== Bibliography ==
- Laffi, Umberto. Colonie e municipi nello Stato romano Ed. di Storia e Letteratura. Roma, 2007 ISBN 8884983509
- Mommsen, Theodore. The Provinces of the Roman Empire Section: Roman Africa. (Leipzig 1865; London 1866; London: Macmillan 1909; reprint New York 1996) Barnes & Noble. New York, 1996
- Smyth Vereker, Charles. Scenes in the Sunny South: Including the Atlas Mountains and the Oases of the Sahara in Algeria. Volume 2. Publisher Longmans, Green, and Company. University of Wisconsin. Madison,1871 ( Roman Theveste )
