= Siege of Corduba =

Final battle of Caesar's Civil War in present-day southern Spain, 45 BC

Siege of Corduba (45 BC)
Date	March 19, or 20-21, 45 BC
Location	Corduba, Hispania Ulterior (modern day Spain) 37.8882°N 4.7794°W
Result	Caesarian Victory

Belligerents
Caesarians	Pompeians

Commanders and leaders
Julius Caesar	Annio Scapula †

Strength
1–2 legions (approximately 5,000–10,000 Men)	20,000 Men; 9 Legions (depleted); Town Militia

Casualties and losses
Unknown, but light	22,000 killed

The siege of Corduba was an engagement near the end of Caesar's Civil War, in which Julius Caesar had besieged the city of Corduba after Sextus Pompey, Son of Pompey Magnus had fled the city leaving Annio Scapula in charge. Caesar stormed the city and 22,000 people died.

== Background ==
Caesar's Civil War had begun in 49 BC due to the escalating tensions over the previous decade between Gaius Julius Caesar and the Roman Senate, who turned to his old ally Gnaeus Pompeius Magnus ("Pompey the Great"). Caesar famously crossed the Rubicon river in January, being labeled as "enemy of the people" by the senate. Caesar would go on to conquer Italy, Spain, Sardinia, and Sicily. Caesar would next invade Greece and although suffering a setback at Dyrrhachium, he eventually crushed Pompey at the Battle of Pharsalus. Pompey fled to Egypt, where he was assassinated by the egyptians in an attempt to appease Caesar. Caesar then intervened in the Alexandrian Civil War to avenge Pompey, eventually deciding to help Egyptian pharaoh, Cleopatra to the throne after defeating her younger brother, Ptolemy XIII after the Battle of the Nile. The young Ptolemy was killed and Cleopatra was put on the throne.

Despite the military victory in Egypt, and with a friendly ruler in Egypt, problems swiftly began to rise, in Hispania a pro-Pompeian rebellion arose against Caesar's governor in Spain, Quintus Cassius Longinus, led by Marcellus. In the East the Pontic ruler Pharnaces II, the son of the more famous Mithridates VI had invaded and begun attacking Rome's client states that Pompey had set up and even defeated Caesar's legate, Gnaeus Domitius Calvinus at the Battle of Nicopolis. Meanwhile a Pompeian fleet arrived near dalmatia under the command of Marcus Octavius and started a pro-Pompeian rebellion. This forced Caesar to confront the Pontic king, in what he expected would be a hard fought and long campaign, however Pharnaces II decided to charge uphill at Caesar's position leading to the Battle of Zela and the origin of the phrase "Veni, vidi, vici" (I came; I saw; I conquered). Pharnaces II would be killed by the usurper, Asander. Caesar's luck improved following the victory at Zela. The future member of the Second Triumvirate, Marcus Aemilius Lepidus had managed to quell the Pompeian revolt with the help of Mauretania. The former governor, Quintus Cassius Longinus then died in a ship wreck. Publius Vatinius then assembled a small fleet of ships, manned by legionaries who were too sick to join Caesar in Greece and prepared to confront Octavius. He swiftly won the resulting Battle of Tauris and Octavius fled to Africa.

Caesar would return to Italy and set upon conquering the last of Pompey's supporters in the province of Africa. Caesar proceeded to carry out his plan, succeeding in 46 BC when he crushed a Pompeian army at the Battle of Thapsus. Many Pompeians were killed in the aftermath including Cato the Younger, Metellus Scipio, Lucius Afranius, Marcus Petreius, Faustus Cornelius Sulla, and the king of Numidia, Juba I. Others had fled to Hispania, modern day Spain, to continue the fight including Gnaeus Pompeius Magnus, his brother Sextus, Titus Labienus, and the commander of the Pompeian fleet at Thapsus, Publius Attius Varus. Caesar would then fight a long and hard fought campaign against the Pompeians before eventually crushing them at the Battle of Munda; many Pompeians, including Varus and Labienus, were killed. Caesar's men under Lucius Caesennius Lento found Gnaeus Pompey and killed him at the Battle of Lauro. By now the only main Pompeian Leader was Sextus Pompey, who was in the city of Corduba. Caesar began to take the last remaining pro-Pompeian cities in the region including Munda itself.

== Prelude ==
In the aftermath of the Battle of Munda, the remaining defeated Pompeians under the command of Annio Scapula retreated to the city of Corduba bringing news of the defeat at Munda and the death of Sextus's brother, while Scapula's legionaries were further supplemented by the towns militia as well as raw recruits, conscipits, and volunteers making the army in Corduba around 20,000 strong. Caesar then turned his attention to Sextus following the death of Gnaeus and left Quintus Fabius Maximus with a small army to continue besieging Munda and set off marching towards Corduba. Sextus having heard news of Caesar's march because of his spies, and he decided to abandon the town. He convinced his officers that he wanted to parley with Caesar and suggest terms, however he fled the town with 100 horse to Lusitania, leaving Annio Scapula in charge.

== Siege ==
On either March 19 or 20 Caesar arrived near Corduba. Caesar immediately attempted to capture a bridge that ran across the Betis river, however the Pompeians on the other side arrived and forced Caesar and his men back across the river. Caesar then realized that making more attempts would both delay him and only drain his forces; he decided to construct a new bridge for his men to cross. Caesar successfully forded the river shortly after its construction with his whole army. He arrived near the city itself and set up a camp. Scapula meanwhile, knowing that Caesar would show him no mercy, proceeded to commit suicide. He gathered family and friends in a great banquet, dressed in his best clothes, gave desserts and jewelry to the guests and when the time came, he ordered a slave behind him to run him through with a sword.

Caesar then finished constructing his siege camp and managed to fully surround the city, allowing no reinforcements or supplies to enter. He was also able to build a circumvallation wall made with the corpses of Pompeians piled with stakes driven into the ground as they were too exhausted to build a palisade. The following day either the 20th or 21st, the townsfolk were in disarray, with their leader dead and many citizens wanting to surrender than face death. This caused a spilt in the town's population with some wanting surrender and accept Caesar's terms and others that wished to remain defiant, and as result two factions emerged, similar to what happened at many towns and cities during the campaign including Ategua and Carteia. This caused violence on the streets and riots engaged the civilians in a civil war. The chaos even reached the ears of Caesar's camp, the Caesarian faction meanwhile were engaging the XIII Legion in combat and despite the bravely of the legion, soon the Caesarians had managed to gain control of the gates and sent to message to Caesar asking for assistance.

The legionnaires were now desperate and started a massive fire so that the villia would be handed over. Caesar then ordered his men to assault the city via the gateway that the Caesarian faction had managed to capture. The two united forces then set about two objectives, putting out the fire and killing opponents. The fighting was brutal in the city streets and they were filled with corpses. It was said that there was so many dead that the dead and dying obstructed the passage of the cavalry and the blood ran in torrents until the nearby river turned red. The city was now in ruins because of the fire and fighting. Caesar's men were now angry at finding nothing in the ruined city began to massacre the townsfolk and at the end some 22,000 people were killed (This includes the soldiers killed in the previous fighting), also among those they killed included many of those in the Caesarian faction who had opened the gates for them. Many more were killed outside the cities wall and only a small number escaping the carnage. This is one of the few times in which Caesar lost complete control of his army.

== Aftermath ==
Caesar remained in the ruins of Corduba until the Caesarians from Hispalis came asking him for help. The owners of the city refused to surrender, imposing a siege on March 26. Hispalis surrendered peacefully 19 on April 4 and was left in charge of a garrison commanded by Gaius Caninius Rebilus. 7 On April he occupied Asta Regia and two days later Gades. 10 But soon after the inhabitants revolted 19 and massacred his supporters. Caesar again besieged it but in such an apparently careless manner that gradually groups of defenders tried to escape, being killed outside the walls and weakening the defences. The town fell on August 9 and Caesar took revenge by mercilessly murdering the Pompeians. Shortly afterwards he was returning to Rome from Gades. This was one the last battles of the civil war.

== See also ==
- Caesar's Civil War
- Julius Caesar
- Sextus Pompey
- Battle of Munda
- Battle of Lauro

== Sources ==
- Julius Caesar, Commentarii de Bello Civili 2.40
- Cassius Dio . Roman history . Book 43. Digitized by UChicago . Based on Loeb Classical Library edition volume 3, Ancient Greek-English translation by Earnest Cary, 1924.
- Goldsworthy, Adrian (2006). "XXI". Caesar: Life of a Colossus. New Haven: Yale Press. p. 466.
- Amela Valverde, Luis (2002). The clients of Gnaeus Pompey Magnus in Hispania . Barcelona: Editions Universitat Barcelona, pp. 1810.
- Dodge, Theodore Ayrault (1900). Caesar: a history of the art of war among the Romans down to the end of the Roman empire, with a detailed account of the campaigns of Gaius Julius Caesar. Boston: Houghton, Mifflin & Company, pp. 792.
- González de la Llana, Manuel (1867). Chronicle of the province of Córdoba . Madrid: Rubio and Company, pp. 15
- Carcopino, Jérôme (2004). Julius Caesar: the classical process of the concentration of power. Madrid: Rialp Editions, pp. 518.
- Madoz, Pascual (1847). Geographical-statistical-historical dictionary of Spain and its overseas possessions . Volume VI. Madrid: Literary-typographic establishment of P. Madoz and L. Sagasti, pp. 647.
- Fishwick, Duncan (2004). The Imperial Cult in the Latin West: Studies in the Ruler Cult of the Western Provinces of the Roman Empire . BRILL, pp. 71–72.
- Appian . Book 2 of The Civil Wars . Volume 14 of Roman History . Digitized by Perseus . Based on Ancient Greek-English translation by Horace White, London: MacMillan & Co., 1899.
