= Luria gens =

Ancient Roman family

The gens Luria was a minor plebeian family at ancient Rome. Although many Lurii are known from inscriptions, the only member of this gens to play a significant role in history was Marcus Lurius, a lieutenant of Octavian in the years following the death of Caesar.

== Members ==
- Marcus Lurius, governor of Sardinia in 40 BC, during the war against Sextus Pompey, fought off an invasion led by Menas; but while giving chase he was defeated, and forced to abandon the island. In 31 BC, Lurius commanded the right wing of Octavian's fleet at the Battle of Actium.
- Publius Lurius Agrippa, a triumvir monetalis in the time of Augustus.
- Lurius Varus, consul sometime between 40 and 46, was expelled from the Senate for extortion while as proconsul of Pannonia or Dalmatia. He secured his re-admittance in 57 with the help of Otho.
- Marcus Lurius Varus, mentioned in an inscription at Reate. His relation to the other Lurii is uncertain.

== See also ==
- List of Roman gentes

== Bibliography ==
- Appianus Alexandrinus (Appian), Bellum Civile (The Civil War).
- Lucius Cassius Dio Cocceianus (Cassius Dio), Roman History.
- Marcus Velleius Paterculus, Compendium of Roman History.
- Fulvius Ursinus, Familiae Romanae quae Reperiuntur in Antiquis Numismatibus (Roman Families Found in Ancient Coins), Rome (1577).
- Jean Foy-Vaillant, Numismata Imperatorum Romanorum Praestantiora a Julio Caesare ad Postumus (Outstanding Imperial Coins from Caesar to Postumus), Giovanni Battista Bernabò & Giuseppe Lazzarini, Rome (1674, 1743).
- Dictionary of Greek and Roman Biography and Mythology, William Smith, ed., Little, Brown and Company, Boston (1849).
- Ronald Syme, "Lurius Varus, a Stray Consular Legate", in Harvard Studies in Classical Philology, vol. 88, pp. 165–169 (1984).
- François Jacques, "L'origine du domaine de la Villa Magna Variana id est Mappalia Siga (Henchir Mettich): une hypothèse", in Antiquités africaines, vol. 29, pp. 63–69 (1993).
