= 45 BC =

45 BC in various calendars
- Gregorian calendar: 45 BC; XLV BC
- Ab urbe condita: 709
- Ancient Egypt era: XXXIII dynasty, 279
- Pharaoh: Cleopatra VII, 7
- Ancient Greek Olympiad (summer): 183rd Olympiad, year 4
- Assyrian calendar: 4706
- Balinese saka calendar: N/A
- Bengali calendar: −638 – −637
- Berber calendar: 906
- Buddhist calendar: 500
- Burmese calendar: −682
- Byzantine calendar: 5464–5465
- Chinese calendar: 乙亥年 (Wood Pig); 2653 or 2446 — to — 丙子年 (Fire Rat); 2654 or 2447
- Coptic calendar: −328 – −327
- Discordian calendar: 1122
- Ethiopian calendar: −52 – −51
- Hebrew calendar: 3716–3717
- Hindu calendars
- Vikram Samvat: 12–13
- Shaka Samvat: N/A
- Kali Yuga: 3056–3057
- Holocene calendar: 9956
- Iranian calendar: 666 BP – 665 BP
- Islamic calendar: 686 BH – 685 BH
- Javanese calendar: N/A
- Julian calendar: 45 BC; XLV BC
- Korean calendar: 2289
- Minguo calendar: 1956 before ROC 民前1956年
- Nanakshahi calendar: −1512
- Seleucid era: 267/268 AG
- Thai solar calendar: 498–499
- Tibetan calendar: ཤིང་མོ་ཕག་ལོ་ (female Wood-Boar); 82 or −299 or −1071 — to — མེ་ཕོ་བྱི་བ་ལོ་ (male Fire-Rat); 83 or −298 or −1070

Year 45 BC was either a common year starting on Thursday, Friday or Saturday or a leap year starting on Friday or Saturday (the sources differ, see leap year error for further information) and the first year of the Julian calendar and a leap year starting on Friday of the Proleptic Julian calendar. At the time, it was known as the Year of the Consulship of Caesar without Colleague (or, less frequently, year 709 Ab urbe condita). The denomination 45 BC for this year has been used since the early medieval period, when the Anno Domini calendar era became the prevalent method in Europe for naming years.

== Events ==
=== By place ===
==== Roman Republic ====
- Fourth consulship of Gaius Julius Caesar (without colleague).
- January 1 – The Julian calendar takes effect as the civil calendar of the Roman Empire, establishing a solar calendar that is based on the Egyptian calendar of the day.
- March 17 – Civil War: In his last victory, Julius Caesar defeats the Pompeian forces of Titus Labienus and Pompey the younger in the Battle of Munda. Labienus dies in battle, Pompey the younger is executed, but Sextus Pompey escapes to take command of the remnants of the Pompeian fleet.
- The veterans of Julius Caesar's Legions Legio XIII Gemina and Legio X Equestris demobilize. The veterans of the 10th legion are settled in Narbo, while those of the 13th are given somewhat better lands in Italia itself.
- End of the Roman Civil War.
- Caesar is named dictator for life.
- Caesar probably writes his Commentaries in this year.

==== Asia ====
- Possible first year of the Azes I Era.

== Births ==
- Iullus Antonius, son of Mark Antony and Fulvia; consul 10 BC (d. 2 BC)
- Wang Mang, usurper of the Han dynasty and emperor of the Xin dynasty (d. AD 23)

== Deaths ==
- February – Tullia, daughter of Cicero (b. 79 BC or 78 BC)
- March 17
  - Titus Labienus, Roman general (killed in the Battle of Munda) (b. c. 100 BC)
  - Publius Attius Varus, Roman governor (killed in the Battle of Munda)
- April 12 – Gnaeus Pompeius, son of Pompey the Great (executed after the Battle of Munda)
- December 31 – Quintus Fabius Maximus, Roman general and politician
- Nigidius Figulus, Roman scholar (b. 98 BC)
- Publius Cornelius Sulla, Roman politician
