= Caesennia gens =

Etruscan and Roman family

The gens Caesennia was an Etruscan family from Tarquinii during the late Roman Republic and in imperial times. Two of its members were mentioned by Cicero, and the name is found in sepulchral inscriptions.

== Members ==
- Publius Caesennius, mentioned by Cicero in his oration, Pro Caecina.
- Caesennia, wife of Marcus Fulcinius, and later of Aulus Caecina.
- Gaius Caesennius Philo, brought charges against Sextus Cloelius, a scribe who incited mob violence after the death of the tribune of the plebs Publius Clodius Pulcher in 52 BC. Philo succeeded in procuring Cloelius' condemnation.
- Lucius Caesennius Lento, a supporter of Marcus Antonius, and one of seven agrarian commissioners appointed by Antonius to apportion the Campanian and Leontine lands.
- Lucius Caesennius Paetus, consul in A.D. 61, and governor of Syria under the emperor Vespasian.
- Lucius Junius Caesennius Paetus, consul in AD 79.
- Aulus Caesennius Gallus, consul suffectus prior to AD 80.
- Lucius Caesennius Sospes, consul in AD 114.
- Lucius Caesennius Antoninus, consul in AD 128.
- Aulus Junius Pastor Lucius Caesennius Sospes, consul in AD 163.

== See also ==
- List of Roman gentes

== Bibliography ==
- Marcus Tullius Cicero, Pro Caecina.
- Quintus Asconius Pedianus, Commentarius in Oratio Ciceronis Pro Milone (Commentary on Cicero's Oration Pro Milone).
- Dictionary of Greek and Roman Biography and Mythology, William Smith, ed., Little, Brown and Company, Boston (1849).
- Karl Otfried Müller, Die Etrusker, Albert Heitz, Stuttgart (1877).
