= War between Sextus Pompey and the Second Triumvirate =

Civil war in the Roman Republic (42–36 BC)

- Part of the Roman civil wars
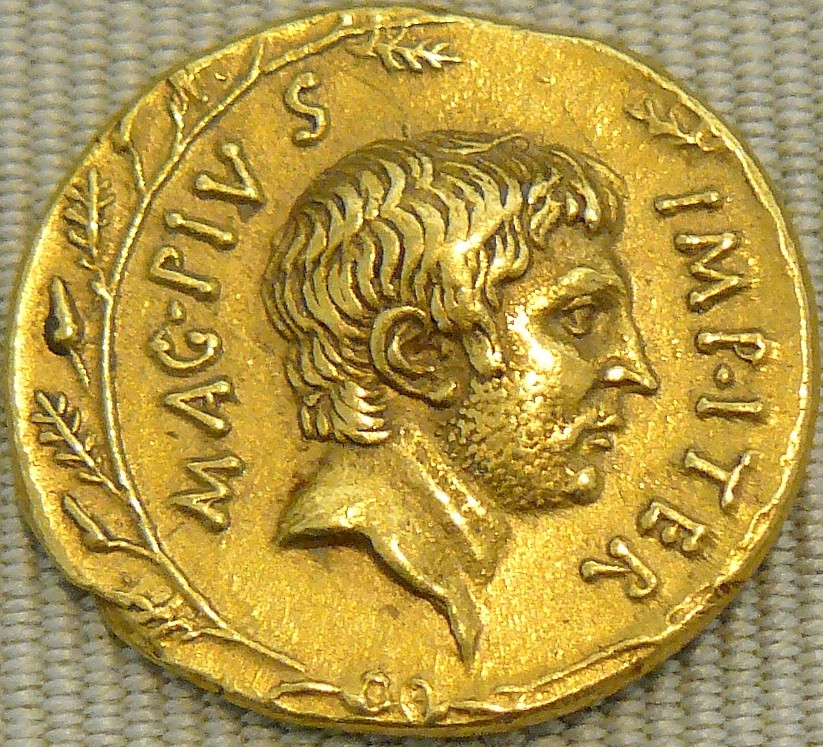
- Aureus coin of Sextus Pompey, minted in Roman Sicily in 37 or 36 BC.
Date	42–36 BC
Location	Sicily, Roman Republic
Result	Triumvirate victory; Destruction of the Optimates; End of all opposition to the Triumvirate; Lepidus sidelined
Territorial changes	Sicily taken by the Triumvirate

Belligerents
Second Triumvirate	Pompeians; Remnants of Optimates

Commanders and leaders
Octavian; Marcus Agrippa; Marcus Aemilius Lepidus; Lucius Cornificius; Titus Statilius Taurus; Gaius Calvisius Sabinus; Mark Antony; Marcus Titius; Gaius Furnius; Amyntas of Galatia	Sextus Pompeius (executed); Menas; Menecratus †; Demochares; Apollophanes; Papias

Casualties and losses
- Total dead: 200,000; 1,000 warships destroyed

The forces of the Second Triumvirate and Sextus Pompey, the last surviving son of Pompey the Great and the last leader of the Optimate faction, waged a civil war between 42 BC and 36 BC. The war consisted of mostly a number of naval engagements throughout the Mediterranean Sea and a land campaign primarily in Sicily that eventually ended in a victory for the Triumvirate and Sextus Pompey's death. The conflict is notable as the last stand of any organised opposition to the Triumvirate.

The result of the war settled the question whether the political ascendancy of the autocratic Triumvirs could be reversed, ending all hopes for the restoration of the constitutional government of the Roman Republic. The war however also led to the breakdown of the Triumvirate itself since Octavian was able to take advantage of discontent in Lepidus' camp to sideline his partner, leaving Octavian and Mark Antony as only rulers of the Roman world and setting the stage for the War of Actium.

== Context ==
Sextus' father, Pompey, had been an enemy of Julius Caesar for many years, and this enmity finally boiled over in 49 BC with the beginning of Caesar's Civil War. Pompey was executed in 48 BC by the Egyptians, but Sextus and his brother, Gnaeus Pompeius, continued fighting until 45 BC, when it was clear that Caesar was the victor. After Munda, Sextus' brother was hunted down and died fighting, but Sextus himself escaped to Sicily and kept a low profile for a while.

When Julius Caesar was assassinated on 15 March 44 BC, Sextus' name was placed on a proscription list formed by Lepidus, Mark Antony, and Octavian, the members of the Second Triumvirate. Those whose names were placed on the list were targeted for death and the confiscation of their property. The proscription was designed not only to fill the treasury, but to help in the Second Triumvirate's war against Brutus and Cassius, and listed all of Caesar's other enemies and their relatives.

== Early victories ==
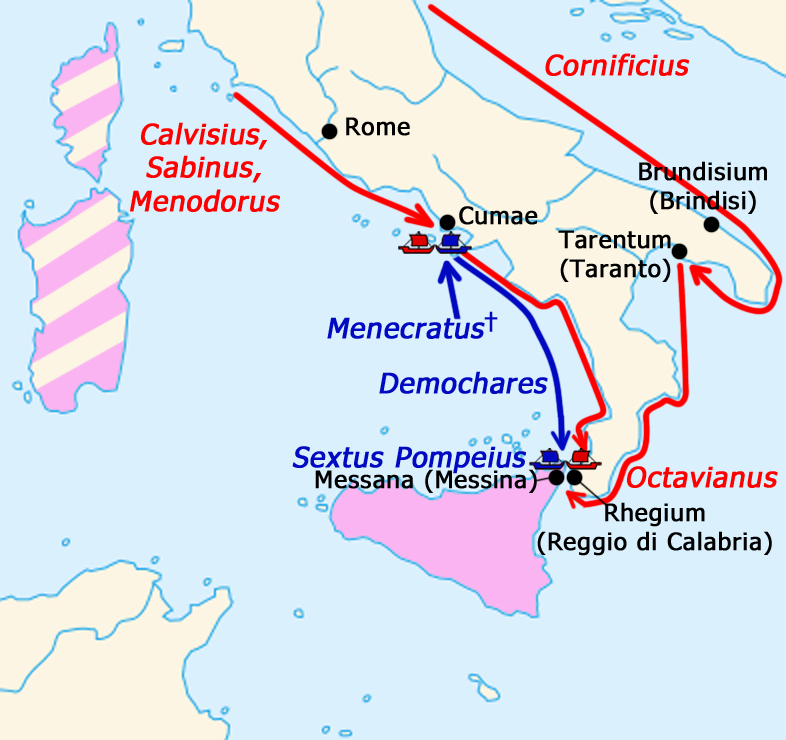
Campaign of 38 BC. Sextus Pompeius' possessions (territories went over to Octavian with Menodorus before the war are painted in pink and beige; ↗ – actions of Octavian and his admirals; ↗ – actions of Sextus' admirals.

Upon finding his name upon this list, Sextus decided to pick up where his father had left off. He selected Sicily as his base, capturing several cities, including Tyndaris, Mylae, and the provincial capital, Messina. Other cities, such as Syracuse, gave in to Sextus' revolt and joined his forces. Sextus soon became a serious force in the civil war following Caesar's death. He amassed a formidable army and a large fleet of warships. Many slaves and friends of his father as well as remnants of the Optimate faction joined his cause, hoping to preserve the Roman Republic, which was quickly turning into an autocratic empire. The multitudes of slaves joining Sextus often came from the villas of patricians, and this desertion hurt the Romans so much that the Vestal Virgins prayed for it to stop.

With his large fleet of ships manned by Sicilian marines and commanded by capable admirals such as Menas, Menecrates and Demochares, Sextus stopped all shipments (especially those of grain) to Rome, and blockaded Italy so as to disable trade with other nations by sea. This blockade was severely crippling to the Roman army as well as to the Italian Peninsula. Finally, as the Roman people were rioting, the members of the Triumvirate decided to recognize Sextus as the ruler of Sardinia, Corsica, and Sicily as long as he agreed to end the blockade and begin sending shipments of grain again. Sextus agreed, and also agreed to stop accepting fugitive slaves to his cause. This treaty was called the Pact of Misenum after Misenum where it was negotiated.

== Major fighting ==
In 42 BC, the Triumvirate defeated Brutus and Cassius at the Battle of Philippi. Once the blockade was ended (after a short and rocky peace), the Triumvirate, especially Octavian and his right-hand man Marcus Agrippa, were able to turn their energies to Sextus, and began an aggressive offensive. Octavian tried to invade Sicily in 38 BC, but the ships were forced to go back because of bad weather.

Agrippa cut part of Via Ercolana and dug a channel to connect the Lucrine Lake to the sea, in order to change it into a harbour, called Portus Julius. The new harbour was used to train the ships for naval battles. A new fleet was built, with 20,000 oarsmen gathered by freeing slaves. The new ships were built much larger, in order to carry many more naval infantry units, which were being trained at the same time. Furthermore, Antony exchanged 20,000 infantry for his Parthian campaign with 120 ships, under the command of Titus Statilius Taurus. In July 36 BC the two fleets sailed from Italy, and another fleet, provided by the third triumvir Marcus Aemilius Lepidus, sailed from Africa, to attack Sextus' stronghold in Sicily.

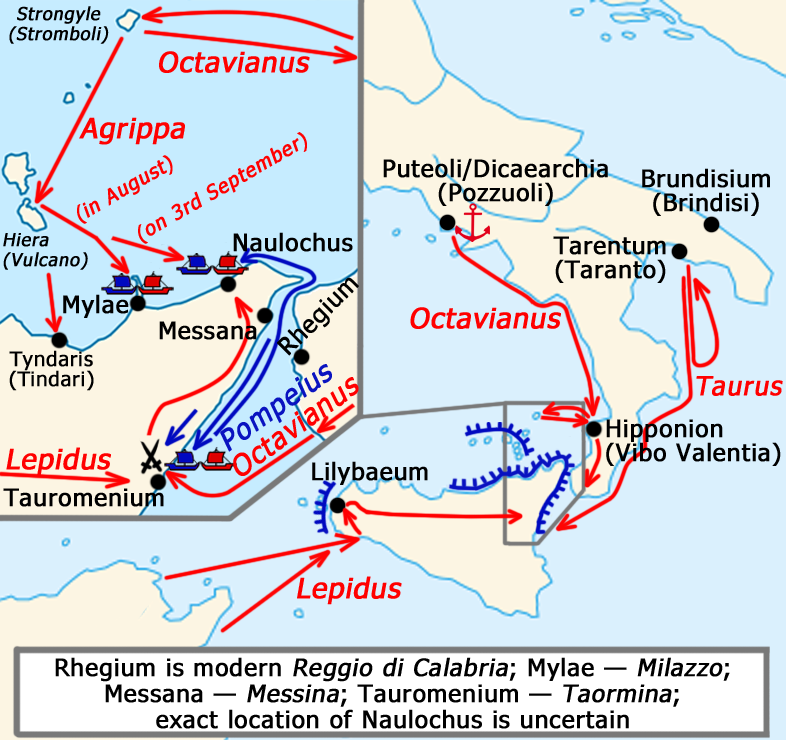
Campaign of 36 BC. ↗ – actions of Octavian and his commanders; ↗ – actions of Sextus Pompeius and his commanders.

In August, Agrippa was able to finally defeat Sextus in a naval battle near Mylae (modern Milazzo); the same month Octavian was defeated and seriously wounded in a battle near Taormina.

At Naulochus, Agrippa met Sextus' fleet. Both fleets were composed of 300 ships, all with artillery, but Agrippa commanded heavier units, armed with the harpax and corvus. Agrippa succeeded in blocking the more manoeuvrable ships of Sextus and, after a long and bloody fight, to defeat his enemy. Agrippa lost three ships, while 28 ships of Sextus were sunk, 17 fled, and the others burnt or captured. Meanwhile Lepidus managed to land the bulk of his army and ravaged the Sicilian countryside.

Some 200,000 men were killed and 1,000 warships destroyed in the fighting which followed, with many of the casualties being taken by Sextus and his army and navy. Tyndaris and Messina were particularly hard hit, and the area in between was ravaged.

== Aftermath ==
In 36 BC, Sextus fled Sicily (effectively ending the war) to Miletus where, in 35 BC, he was captured and executed by Marcus Titius, one of Marcus Antonius' minions, without a trial. This was illegal, as he was a Roman citizen, and therefore entitled to a trial. This malpractice was capitalized upon by Octavian when the relationship between him and Marcus Antonius became heated.

The final end of Pompeian resistance immediately highlighted the growing distrust between the Triumvirs. When Octavian made a visit to Lepidus' camp and was hailed by soldiers as Caesar's son, Lepidus made an ill-judged move to expel his guest beyond the limits of the camp. This caused much of Lepidus' army to defect to Octavian's side and gave Octavian the excuse he needed to sideline Lepidus entirely. Lepidus was accused by Octavian of usurping power in Sicily and of attempted rebellion. Lepidus was forced to submit, exiled to Circeii and was stripped of all his offices except that of pontifex maximus. His former provinces were seized by Octavian.

Much of the vast farmland in Sicily was either ruined or left empty, and much of this land was taken and distributed to members of the legions which had fought in Sicily. What this accomplished was twofold: it served to fill Sicily with loyal, grateful inhabitants, and it promised to bring back Sicily's former productivity.

30,000 slaves were captured and returned to their masters, with another 6,000 being impaled upon wooden stakes as an example.

== Historical sources ==
- Appian (1899). White, Horace (ed.). The Roman History of Appian of Alexandria: The civil wars. George Bell & Sons.

== Bibliography ==
- Sheppard, Si; Hook, Christa, eds. (2009). Actium 31 BC: downfall of Antony and Cleopatra. Campaign. Oxford: Osprey. pp. 6–18. ISBN 978-1-84603-405-3.
- Tucker, Spencer, ed. (2010). A global chronology of conflict: from the ancient world to the modern Middle East. Santa Barbara, Calif.: ABC-Clio. p. 131. ISBN 978-1-85109-672-5.
- Everitt, Anthony (2006). Augustus: The Life of Rome's First Emperor. Random House. pp. 116–143. ISBN 978-1-58836-555-2.
- Stone, Shelley C. (1983). "Sextus Pompey, Octavian and Sicily". American Journal of Archaeology. 87 (1): 11–22. doi:10.2307/504662. ISSN 0002-9114. JSTOR 504662.
