= Gnaeus Pompeius =

Gnaeus Pompeius may refer to:

== Relatives of Pompey the Great ==
- Gnaeus Pompeius Strabo
- Pompey (Gnaeus Pompeius Magnus)
- Gnaeus Pompeius Magnus (son of Pompey)
- Gnaeus Pompeius Magnus (husband of Claudia Antonia)

== Others ==
- Gnaeus Pompeius Trogus (1st century BC), a Roman historian who adopted the nomen Pompeius from Pompey the Great after serving in Pompey's war against Quintus Sertorius
- Gnaeus Pompeius (consul 31 BC) (died 14 AD), possibly the great-grandson of the Roman dictator Lucius Cornelius Sulla, suffect consul in 31 BC

== See also ==
- Pompeia gens
