= Battle of Mylae (36 BC) =

Naval battle of the Sicilian Revolt

- Part of the Sicilian revolt
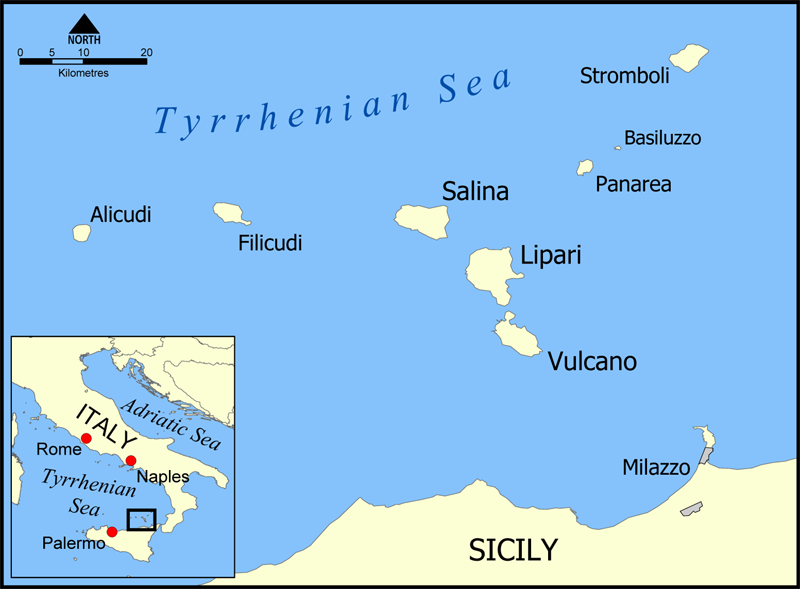
- Location of Mylae (Milazzo) on the coast of northern Sicily
| Date | 11 August 36 BC |
| Location | Offshore Mylae, northern Sicily |
| Result | Second Triumvirate victory |

Belligerents
| Second Triumvirate | Pompeians |

Commanders and leaders
| Agrippa | Papias |

Casualties and losses
| 5 ships | 30 ships |

The Battle of Mylae took place in 36 BC during the War between Sextus Pompey and the Second Triumvirate, between the Second Triumvirate under the command of Agrippa and the Pompeians under the command of Sextus Pompey led by Papias, which occurred in the city of Mylae (present-day Milazzo), off the north coast of Sicily. The battle resulted in a victory for the Second Triumvirate.

== Background ==
Sextus Pompey in the Treaty of Misenum agreed with the Second Triumvirate on a distribution of power. He ruled the islands of Sardinia, Corsica and Sicily, with a powerful navy with which he controlled a large part of the Mediterranean Sea. At the beginning of the following year, however, his admiral Menodoros defected with three legions and 60 ships to Octavian, giving him control of Corsica and Sardinia and receiving equestrian rank as a reward. He fought for Octavian under Calvisius Sabinus in the naval battle off Cumae. In 36 BC he returned to Sextus Pompey, but Sextus had him closely watched and Menodoros, unhappy with being treated with suspicion, again changed sides.

Pompey responded with a blockade of the sea routes, which cut Rome off from important sources of grain, and repulsed one of Octavian's first attempted invasions. After this failure, Octavian's friend and lieutenant Agrippa designed a large-scale invasion plan for Octavian to conquer Sicily. Three different armies under the leadership of Octavian, Statilius Taurus and Lepidus were to land in Sicily from Puteoli, Taranto, and Africa.

== Battle ==
Octavian sailed in August 36 BC with his fleet first to Stromboli. After his scouts had the impression that the main force of Sextus Pompeius was facing him on the Sicilian coast, he handed over the supreme command to Agrippa and hurried back to Italy, from there with the second invasion army under the command of Statilius Taurus in Tauromenium (Taormina) to land on the northeast coast of Sicily. Agrippa sailed on with the fleet to Hiera (Marettimo) in the west of Sicily and occupied the island, which was not defended by Sextus' troops. Agrippa then sailed east with half of his ships to attack a fleet under Papias. Sextus watched Agrippa's advance and sent most of his ships to Papias as reinforcements. The two fleets met at Mylae (Milazzo) on the 11th of August. When Agrippa realized that he was now facing a much larger fleet, he immediately requested the ships that remained with Hiera. He also sent a messenger to Octavian to let him know that Sextus’ main forces were now bound at Mylae.

Both fleets were equipped with catapults and towers. Sextus' ships were smaller and more agile and had more experienced sailors. Agrippa's ships, on the other hand, were larger and more stable and superior in close combat. Papias' tactic was to disable the enemy ships and isolate them from their formation. He tried by skillful ship maneuvers to destroy the rudders of the opposing ships without being boarded himself. Agrippa's ships, however, tried to ram their opponents or to conquer them with the help of grappling hooks and grappling bridges (corvus). In this way they succeeded in sinking Papias' ship themselves. However, he was able to save himself by swimming to one of his neighboring ships.

Sextus Pompey watched the battle from the bank. When he realized that Agrippa's ships were operating more successfully and that other ships were arriving from Hiera, he let Papias begin a controlled retreat. Its ships slowly retreated into shallow coastal waters and estuaries, into which Agrippa's captains with their larger ships did not want to follow and the battle came to an end. At that time Papias had lost 30 ships, Agrippa however only lost 5.

== Aftermath ==
Sextus managed to withdraw his ships unmolested from the coastal waters and reunite them into a fleet. With this he sailed from Agrippa to the east. With his quick retreat, Sextus surprised Octavian when he landed in Tauromenium and successfully attacked him. Octavian was barely able to save himself ashore and suffered the loss of over 60 ships. Despite this success, Sextus could not prevent the landing of Octavian's troops and had to bring his fleet to safety from the advancing Agrippa. After a large part of Sicily had already been controlled by the invasion troops brought in from Africa and Italy, the last major sea battle took place in the Bay of Naulochos in September, in which Agrippa destroyed Sextus' fleet.
