= El Terril =

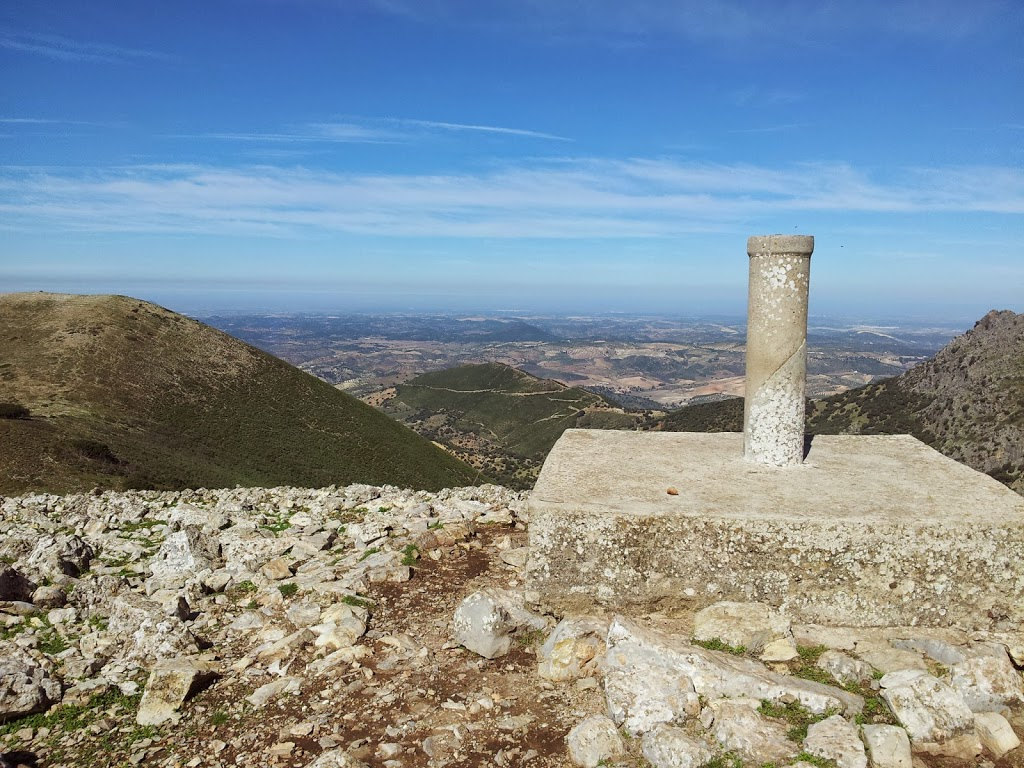

Highest point
- Elevation: 1,129 m (3,704 ft)
- Prominence: 493 m (1,617 ft)
- Coordinates: 36°59′56″N 5°10′24″W

Geography
- Location within Andalusia
- Location: Algámitas and Pruna, Province of Seville, Andalusia, Spain

Pico del Terril, commonly known as El Terril or Terril, is the highest altitude of the Province of Seville, Andalusia, Spain, with a height of 1129 meters above sea level. It is located on the border between the municipalities of Algámitas and Pruna, at the top of the hill known as "El Monigote" which is the highest in the Sierra del Tablón. It neighbors the Peñón de Algámitas.
