= Marcus Scaurus =

Marcus Scaurus may refer to:

- Marcus Aemilius Scaurus (consul 115 BC)
- Marcus Aemilius Scaurus (praetor 56 BC), son of the consul above
- Marcus Aemilius Scaurus (son of Mucia)
- Marcus Aurelius Scaurus (died 105 BC), a Roman politician and general
