= Papias (admiral) =

Papias was a Roman admiral in the 1st century BC. During the Roman civil wars he participated in Sicilian revolt under the command of Sextus Pompeius.

Appian mentions Papias several times in his work The Civil Wars (Emphylia, Ἐμφύλια), when he describes the fight over Sicily. In the summer of 36 BC Papias attacked the fleet of Lepidus transporting his invasion army from Africa to Lilybaeum (Marsala) in the southwest of Sicily. Though he managed to inflict heavy losses on the fleet of Lepidus, he ultimately failed to prevent his army from landing. Later on August 11 of the same year he led the fleet of Sextus Pompeius into the battle of Mylae against Agrippa. During course of the battle Papias' own ship was sunk, but he managed to swim to another ship of his fleet being nearby and continued the battle. However Pompeius, who observed the battle from the shore, ordered a withdrawal after he recognized that the battle seemed to tilt in Agrippa's favour and that he had reinforcements arriving as well. Papias managed an orderly retreat of the fleet into the shoals, where the larger and heavier ships of Agrippa's fleet didn't dare to follow them. Later Papias' ships slipped away and sailed eastward.
