= Vetilia gens =

Ancient Roman family

The gens Vetilia, also written Vecilia, was a minor plebeian family at Rome. Members of this gens never attained much importance in the Roman state.

== Origin ==
The Vetilii were probably of Etruscan origin, their nomen being Latinised from the Etruscan Vetlnei.

== Members ==
- Gaius Vetilius, praetor in 147 BC, was sent to Hispania, where after initial successes against the Lusitanians, he was defeated by Viriathus near Tribola, and slain.
- Vetilius, a leno, or pandar, to whom a certain Juventius left a legacy. The praetor Quintus Metellus refused Vetilius' claim for the property on account of his unsavoury occupation.
- Publius Vetilius, described by Cicero as a relative of Sextus Aebutius, was one of the witnesses in the trial of Aulus Caecina Severus.

== See also ==
- List of Roman gentes

== Bibliography ==
- Marcus Tullius Cicero, Pro Caecina.
- Valerius Maximus, Factorum ac Dictorum Memorabilium (Memorable Facts and Sayings).
- Appianus Alexandrinus (Appian), Hispanica (The Spanish Wars).
- Dictionary of Greek and Roman Biography and Mythology, William Smith, ed., Little, Brown and Company, Boston (1849).
- August Pauly, Georg Wissowa, et alii, Realencyclopädie der Classischen Altertumswissenschaft (Scientific Encyclopedia of the Knowledge of Classical Antiquities, abbreviated RE or PW), J. B. Metzler, Stuttgart (1894–1980).
