= Marcus Titius =

Roman suffect consul in 31 BC

Marcus Titius was a Roman politician (suffect consul in 31 BC) and commander at the end of the Roman Republic.

== Descent and proscription ==
Marcus Titius was the son of a Lucius Titius and nephew of Lucius Munatius Plancus. The offices which Lucius Titius held are not known but he was proscribed at the end of 43 BC and escaped to Sextus Pompey, after which time, his son Marcus Titius built a fleet and plundered the coast of Etruria. In 40 BC he was captured in Gallia Narbonensis by Menodorus, a general of Sextus Pompey, but pardoned for his father's sake. When the triumvirs Mark Antony and Octavian wanted to settle their conflict with Sextus Pompey in the Pact of Misenum in the summer of 39 BC many exiles were allowed to come back to Rome, so Marcus Titius and his father did likewise.

== Career under Mark Antony ==
=== Parthian War ===
Probably under the influence of Munatius Plancus, his nephew Titius soon became a follower of Mark Antony. In 36 BC Titius took part as quaestor in Antony's campaign against Parthia. After the Romans tried in vain to capture Phraaspa, the capital of Media Atropatene, they withdrew to Armenia, but on their way they were harassed by the Parthian army. During one of these attacks, Titius tried in vain to stop the tribune Flavius Gallus pursuing the enemy. The army of Gallus was soon surrounded and only saved by Antony when he arrived with the main force.

=== War against Sextus ===
In the meantime Sextus Pompey had escaped to Lesbos after his final defeat by Octavian at the end of 36 BC. There he raised a new army and fleet. After his return from the Parthian war, Antony learnt of the arrival of Pompey and received his envoys to negotiate about an alliance. However, the triumvir was mistrustful and instructed Titius to advance with an army and a fleet against Pompey and, if necessary, to fight against him, but, if Pompey would be willing to submit, Titius should escort him to Alexandria. In the meantime, Pompey had landed in northwestern Asia Minor at the beginning of 35 BC without resistance from Gaius Furnius, the governor of the Roman province of Asia, because Furnius did not have enough forces and had received no orders from Antony. Accordingly, Pompey was able to capture Lampsacus, Nicaea and Nicomedia, but then Titius arrived from Syria with his army and a fleet of 120 ships. The fleet of Titius was reinforced by 70 ships that arrived from Sicily where they had previously supported Octavian's fleet against Pompey. Titius set up his fleet command at Proconnesus.

Because Titius declined negotiations and enjoyed overwhelming naval superiority, Sextus Pompey burnt his fleet and integrated its crew within his land forces, intending to march through Bithynia to Armenia. He was pursued by the armies of Titius, Furnius and Amyntas, the king of Galatia. Pompey was able to inflict losses on his enemies by an assault but soon his situation became quite desperate. He offered Furnius, who had been his father Pompeius Magnus' friend, his surrender if Furnius would accompany him to Antony. However, Furnius referred him to Titius, apparently because he was not authorized to conclude an agreement; so it seems that Titius was the supreme commander of the army and therefore, since the beginning of 35 BC, the new governor of Asia. Pompey declined to surrender to Titius because he had once pardoned him as prisoner and therefore considered him ungrateful. At night Pompey tried to reach the coast with lightly armed troops to burn Titius' fleet, but his half-brother Marcus Aemilius Scaurus betrayed the plan. As a result, Amyntas and his 1500 horsemen were able to catch Pompey up near Midaeion in Phrygia and capture him. Pompey was taken to Miletus and there executed in the summer of 35 BC at Titius' order.

Whether Titius executed Pompey on his own initiative, or by order of Antony or Munatius Plancus, is uncertain and was already disputed in ancient times. The Roman historian Cassius Dio asserts that Antony ordered the death sentence in a first letter addressed to Titius but canceled this order in a second letter. Nevertheless, Pompey was executed either because Titius complied with the letter with the death sentence intentionally or because he mistook it for the second letter. The second possibility is improbable in view of the conditions of the ancient postal system. According to the military historian Appian Titius executed Pompey either because he was angry about a former insult or on Antony's instructions. In the latter case it was possibly not the triumvir himself but Munatius Plancus who gave the order, as Antony did not want to take sole responsibility, since his lover, the Egyptian Queen Cleopatra VII, was well-disposed towards Pompey and because of his reputation. In spite of the contradictory sources it seems quite certain that the death sentence was imposed with the knowledge and the agreement of Antony.

Probably Titius held the office of Pontiff from 34 BC.

=== War of Actium ===
In 33 BC the imminent clash of the triumvirs over sole rule of the Republic became apparent. At the beginning of the war preparations, Antony assembled his troops in Ephesus (winter 33/32 BC). There, Titius, together with his uncle Munatius Plancus, Gnaeus Domitius Ahenobarbus and other leading followers of Antony tried in vain to persuade the triumvir to send Cleopatra back to Egypt. Soon Antony moved the headquarters to Samos. Apparently, Titius accompanied his commander-in-chief to this island because there was found an inscription dedicated to him.

== Defection to Octavian ==
In June or July 32 BC Munatius Plancus and his nephew Titius defected to Octavian. According to the ancient biographer Plutarch the two men changed their party because they were treated insultingly by Cleopatra due to their refusal of her participation in the war. The true reason for their defection may be found in their opportunism. In the past, they were friends of Cleopatra, who named the city Titiopolis in Cilicia after Titius. However, during the course of the propagandistic and military preparations of the war, the uncle and his nephew might have increasingly doubted that Antony would win the war and, therefore, changed sides. Their decision may also have been influenced by quarrels with other leading followers of Antony, Plancus' relations with Antony, which had cooled off, and other reasons which were covered up by Octavian's propaganda.

The two deserters informed Octavian about the content of Antony's testament and the place where it was kept in the custody of the Vestal Virgins – they had both earlier signed it as witnesses. The later Emperor illegally seized the document and found in its (perhaps forged) regulations – especially Antony's confirmation of the territorial gifts to Cleopatra's children and his desire to be buried in Egypt – further reasons to obtain full support of the senate and people for his war against Antony.

== Career under Octavian-Augustus ==
In Rome Titius promoted games in the Theatre of Pompey (built by Pompeius Magnus ca. 55 BC), but Sextus still enjoyed great popularity. The crowd booed Titius off the stage because he had executed Sextus, and Titius had to leave the theatre quickly because he was afraid for his life. From May to October 31 BC Titius was suffect consul. In this function he participated in the last fights before the decisive Battle of Actium. Together with Titus Statilius Taurus he defeated Antony's cavalry. Deiotarus Philadelphus, the king of Paphlagonia, seized this opportunity to desert to Octavian.

In about 13/12 BC Titius became governor of Syria as successor of Octavian's close friend and admiral, Marcus Vipsanius Agrippa. The Jewish king Herod the Great was able to settle the quarrel between Titius and king Archelaus of Cappadocia, when he accompanied Archelaus to Antioch and there met Titius. Titius also received four children, four grandchildren and two daughters-in-law of the Parthian king Phraates IV as hostages. It is unknown when Titius died.

== Marriage ==
Titius was married to Fabia Paullina, the daughter of Quintus Fabius Maximus, the suffect consul of 45 BC. There has been speculation that they may have been the parents of a daughter who married Marcus Salvius Otho but an inscription names Salvius's wife Titia as "daughter of Lucius" so she may instead have been a niece of Marcus.

Titius may be the father of the Titius mentioned in Horace, Epistles 1.3.9, who was one of an entourage of young men accompanying the future emperor Tiberius on a mission to Armenia in 21–20 BC. This younger Titius, who according to Horace wrote poetry in the Pindaric style, may in turn be the friend of the poet Tibullus mentioned in Tibullus 1.4.73. He may also be the same as the Rufus mentioned as a Pindaric poet in Ovid, Ex Ponto 4.16.28.

== Notes ==
Political offices
Preceded by Marcus Valerius Messalla Corvinus	Consul of the Roman Republic; 31 BC (suffect) with Imp. Caesar Augustus III	Succeeded by Gnaeus Pompeius
