= Raid of Carpetania =

- Part of Lusitanian War
- Map of Carpetania
Date	146 BC
Location	Carpetania, Iberian Peninsula
Result	Lusitanian victory

Belligerents
Roman Republic; Iberians	Lusitanians

Commanders and leaders
Gaius Plautius (executed)	Viriathus

Strength
14,000 infantry 1,300 cavalry	Unknown

Casualties and losses
Few survived	Unknown

The Raid of Carpetania was a military conflict between the Lusitanians and the Roman Republic.

== Background ==
Viriathus had been leading a successful guerrilla war against the Romans. In one of these engagements, he ambushed and defeated the Roman commander Caius Vetilius, who had been pursuing him in Tribola. Viriathus used the terrain to his advantage, hiding in dense thickets before launching a surprise attack. After the ambush, the Roman forces were either killed or driven off cliffs.

Vetilius himself was taken prisoner, however, the man who captured him, not knowing who he was, but seeing that he was old and fat, and considering him worthless, killed him.

== The raid ==
After the victory over Vetilius, Viriathus turned his attention to Carpetania. He overran the whole country, raiding the land and destroying Roman crops and property.

To suppress Viriathus, Rome sent a new commander, Gaius Plautius, with 4,000 men to pursue him. However, Viriathus employed his tactics of feigned retreats and ambushes. He lured Plautius into a trap and inflicted heavy casualties, killing nearly the entire Roman force. Plautius fled to winter quarters, not daring to show himself anywhere.

== Aftermath ==
After the success of the raid by Viriathus, the Roman Senate took more drastic measures. They sent the Roman general Fabius Maximus Aemilianus, son of Lucius Aemilius Paulus, with an army of 15,000 infantry and 2,000 cavalry.

== See also ==
- Viriathus
- Lusitanian War

== Sources ==
- Appian's History of Rome.
