= Peñón de Algámitas =

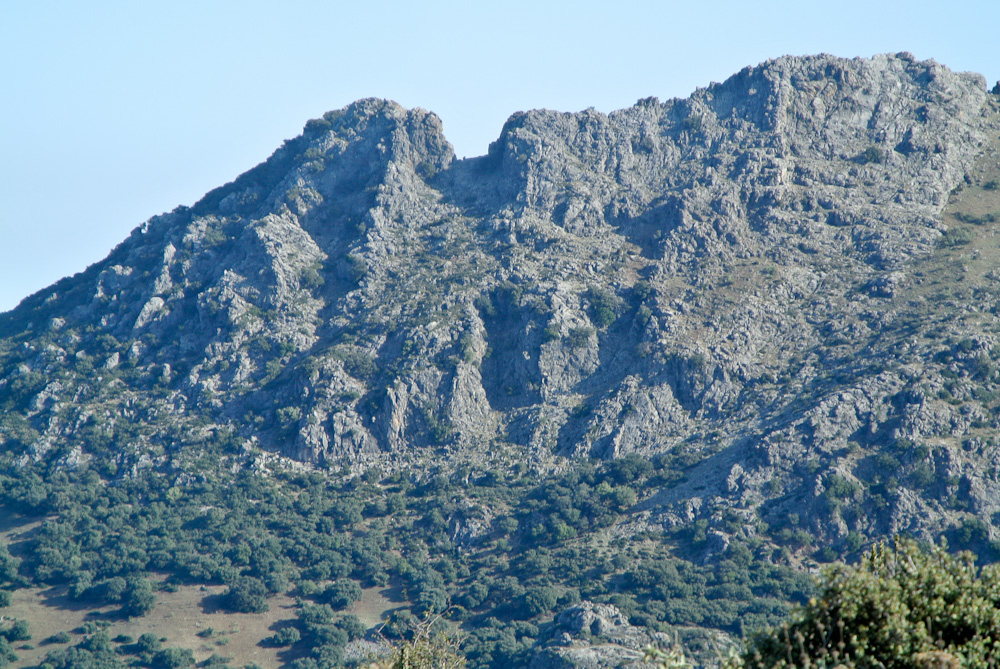

Highest point
- Elevation: 1,121 m (3,678 ft)
- Coordinates: 37°00′48″N 5°10′43″W

Geography
- Location: Algámitas, Province of Seville, Andalusia, Spain

Peñón de Algámitas is a mountain located in the Province of Seville, Andalusia, Spain, with a height of 1121 meters above sea level. It is located in the municipality of Algámitas and shares a border with El Terril. Both mountains belonging to the Sierra del Tablon.
