= Lora de Estepa =

- Municipality
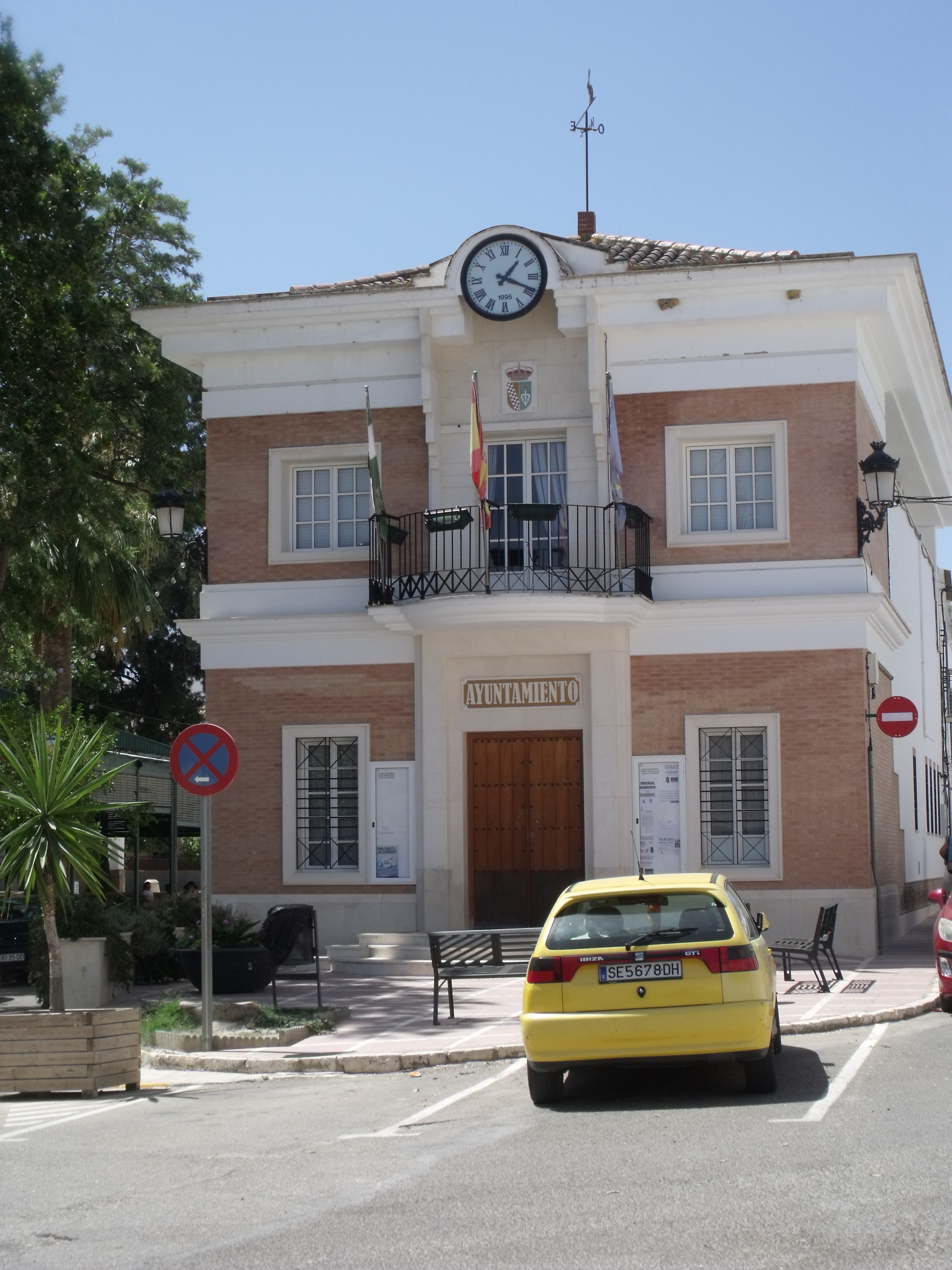
- Town hall

- Coat of arms

- Location in Spain
- Coordinates: 37°16′N 4°49′W
- Country: Spain
- Autonomous Community: Andalusia
- Province: Seville
- Comarca: Sierra Sur de Sevilla

Government
  - Alcaldesa: Salvador Guerrero Reina (PSOE)

Area
  - Total: 18 km^{2} (6.9 sq mi)
- Elevation: 452 m (1,483 ft)

Population (2025-01-01)
  - Total: 890
  - Density: 49/km^{2} (130/sq mi)
- Time zone: UTC+1 (CET)
  - Summer (DST): UTC+2 (CEST)

Lora de Estepa is a city located in the province of Seville, Spain. According to the 2006 census (INE), the city has a population of 831 inhabitants.

== History ==
=== Prehistory ===
The area around Lora de Estepa has been inhabited by humans since Paleolithic times. Local caves were used as tombs during the Copper Age, and later on people from the Tartessos and Iberian cultures settled in the region.

=== Roman era ===
The area was eventually conquered and colonized by Romans. It has been speculated that Lora de Estepa might have been the Roman town of "Lauro" that is mentioned by Florus in his Epitome of Roman history, Book 2. If this identification is correct, Lora de Estepa was the site of an important battle of Caesar's Civil War in 45 BC, during which Caesarian forces cornered and killed Gnaeus Pompeius the Younger, son of Gnaeus Pompeius Magnus. Equating Lauro with Lora de Estepa is, however, still speculative and strongly disputed among historians. In any case, the Roman town at Lora de Estepa was known as "Olaurum" by the 1st century, and served as regional hub for communication and trade. In course of the late antiquity (4th-7th century) Olaurum was largely abandoned, as its population was ruralized and moved to numerous minor hamlets at the nearby villae.

=== Medieval history ===
After the Umayyad conquest of Hispania, the local settlement came to be known as "Al-auriat". Little is known of the town's history under Muslim rule, though the whole region was only sparsely inhabited during this time. The town was conquered by the Christians in 1250 and given to the Order of Santiago, but remained a contested war zone until the Christian conquest of Antequera in 1410. Afterwards, the region's population increased again, and by the 16th century the local town was known as "Lorilla" or "Lora Menor".

== See also ==
- List of municipalities in Seville
