= Pompeia (daughter of Sextus Pompeius) =

Pompeia Magna (about 42 BC – ?) was the daughter and only child of political rebel Sextus Pompey and Scribonia. Pompeia was the only child born to the sons of triumvir Pompey.

== Biography ==
In 39 BC, at the peace of Misenum, Sextus Pompey had betrothed Pompeia to Marcus Claudius Marcellus, the nephew to the heir of Roman Dictator Julius Caesar, Octavian, and a son to Octavian's elder sister Octavia Minor. Pompeia and Marcellus in the end never married. She accompanied her father as they fled into Anatolia in 36 BC. After this moment, Pompeia is not mentioned again in Roman sources.

In the past it was commonly held based on speculation that she had married her maternal uncle Libo, but this has been largely rejected by modern scholars.

== See also ==
- List of Roman women

== Bibliography ==
- William Smith, ed. (1867). "L. Scribonius Libo (4)". Dictionary of Greek and Roman Biography and Mythology. Vol. 1. Boston: Little, Brown and Company. p. 116.
- William Smith, ed. (1867). "Pompeia (5)". Dictionary of Greek and Roman Biography and Mythology. Vol. 1. Boston: Little, Brown and Company. p. 116.
