= 98 BC =

98 BC in various calendars
- Gregorian calendar: 98 BC; XCVIII BC
- Ab urbe condita: 656
- Ancient Egypt era: XXXIII dynasty, 226
- Pharaoh: Ptolemy X Alexander, 10
- Ancient Greek Olympiad (summer): 170th Olympiad, year 3
- Assyrian calendar: 4653
- Balinese saka calendar: N/A
- Bengali calendar: −691 – −690
- Berber calendar: 853
- Buddhist calendar: 447
- Burmese calendar: −735
- Byzantine calendar: 5411–5412
- Chinese calendar: 壬午年 (Water Horse); 2600 or 2393 — to — 癸未年 (Water Goat); 2601 or 2394
- Coptic calendar: −381 – −380
- Discordian calendar: 1069
- Ethiopian calendar: −105 – −104
- Hebrew calendar: 3663–3664
- Hindu calendars
- Vikram Samvat: −41 – −40
- Shaka Samvat: N/A
- Kali Yuga: 3003–3004
- Holocene calendar: 9903
- Iranian calendar: 719 BP – 718 BP
- Islamic calendar: 741 BH – 740 BH
- Javanese calendar: N/A
- Julian calendar: N/A
- Korean calendar: 2236
- Minguo calendar: 2009 before ROC 民前2009年
- Nanakshahi calendar: −1565
- Seleucid era: 214/215 AG
- Thai solar calendar: 445–446
- Tibetan calendar: ཆུ་ཕོ་རྟ་ལོ་ (male Water-Horse); 29 or −352 or −1124 — to — ཆུ་མོ་ལུག་ལོ་ (female Water-Sheep); 30 or −351 or −1123

Year 98 BC was a year of the pre-Julian Roman calendar. At the time it was known as the Year of the Consulship of Nepos and Didius (or, less frequently, year 656 Ab urbe condita) and the Third Year of Tianhan. The denomination 98 BC for this year has been used since the early medieval period, when the Anno Domini calendar era became the prevalent method in Europe for naming years.

== Events ==
=== By place ===
==== Roman Republic ====
- Consuls: Quintus Caecilius Metellus Nepos and Titus Didius.
- The Senate passes the Lex Caecilia Didia, which bans omnibus bills.

==== Asia ====
- Emperor Wu of Han sends the Han general Gongsun Ao on a mission to rescue general Li Ling from Xiongnu captivity. Gongsun achieves little but receives incorrect information that Li has been training Xiongnu soldiers. Enraged, Emperor Wu exterminates Li's clan.

== Births ==
- Nigidius Figulus, Roman philosopher (probable date) (d. 45 BC)
- Terentia, first wife of Cicero (d. AD 4).

== Deaths ==
- Emperor Kaika of Japan, according to legend.
