= Lantejuela =

Lantejuela, Spain
- municipality
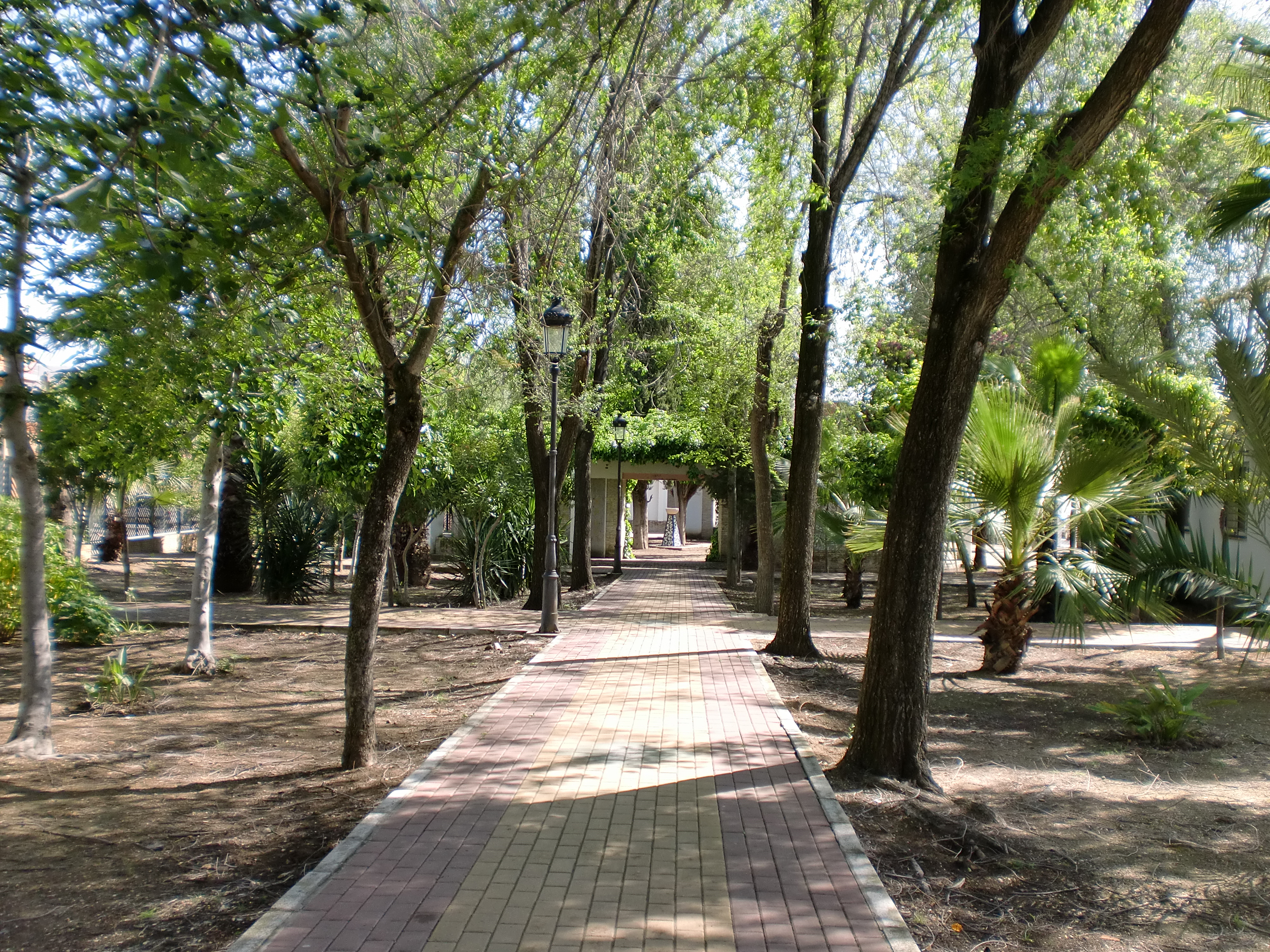
- Antonio Martín Delgado Park in Lantejuela

- Flag Coat of arms
- Interactive map of Lantejuela, Spain
- Coordinates: 37°21′N 5°13′W
- Country: Spain
- Province: Seville
- Municipality: Lantejuela

Area
  - Total: 18 km^{2} (6.9 sq mi)
- Elevation: 152 m (499 ft)

Population (2025-01-01)
  - Total: 3,857
  - Density: 210/km^{2} (550/sq mi)
- Time zone: UTC+1 (CET)
  - Summer (DST): UTC+2 (CEST)

Lantejuela is a municipality located in the province of Seville, Spain, with a population of 3,834 in 2018. It is 26 kilometres (16 mi) from Écija and 86 kilometres (53 mi) from Seville. The region around Lantejuela is the most likely place for the ancient Battle of Munda.

== Name ==
Until 1860, the village was called Lentejuela. Its official name was changed on 4 February 2014 from La Lantejuela to Lantejuela.

== See also ==
- List of municipalities in Seville
