= Marcus Fulcinius =

Banker in ancient Rome

Marcus Fulcinius, a native of Tarquinii in Etruria, was a successful banker at Rome, whom Cicero described as eminently respectable. He was married to Caesennia, a noblewoman also from Tarquinii. During the debt crisis of 88 BC, he sold a farm to his wife in the Ager Tarquiniensis using her dowry to make the investment. He later bought up some land adjacent to the farm, by which time the bank was no longer in operation.

Fulcinius is a secondary beneficiary in the will of his ex-wife Caesennia who died in late 70 or early 69 BC, leaving him 2.8% of her estate. Fulcinius is mentioned in Cicero's case Pro Caecina, dating to 69 BC. His son and namesake Marcus Fulcinius inherited the farm. His son bequeathed it to his friend and presumed maternal relative Publius Caesennius. The fact his farms ended up outside the family upon his son's death indicates there's no direct relation between these Fulcinii and the more well known Fulcinii Triones of the early empire.

== Bibliography ==
- Frier, Bruce W. (1985), The Rise of the Roman Jurists: Studies in Cicero's Pro Caecina, Princeton University Press, ISBN 0691035784
- Kay, Philip (2014), Rome's Economic Revolution, ISBN 9780199681549
