= Mucia Tertia =

Roman woman and third wife of Pompey

- Born: Rome, Italia, Roman Republic
- Died: Rome
- Known for: Rumoured mistress of Julius Caesar
- Spouses: Pompey; Marcus Aemilius Scaurus
- Children: Pompey; Gnaeus Pompeius; Pompeia Magna; Sextus Pompey; Scaurus; Marcus Aemilius Scaurus
- Parents: Quintus Mucius Scaevola (father); Licinia (mother)

Mucia Tertia (fl. 79 – 31 BC) was a Roman matrona who lived in the 1st century BC. She was the daughter of Quintus Mucius Scaevola, the pontifex maximus and consul in 95 BC.

Around 79 BC, Mucia married Pompey, a leading and soon-to-be dominant figure in Roman politics. She was the mother of all three of Pompey's known children. Pompey divorced her in 61 BC, either for adultery or for political reasons. She subsequently married Marcus Aemilius Scaurus and remained active in Roman politics, leading peace talks between her son Sextus Pompey and Octavian in 39 BC and maintaining a relationship of mutual respect with Octavian in the years that followed.

== Early life ==
Mucia was the daughter of Quintus Mucius Scaevola, while Mucia's mother was closely related to Cato the Younger but is otherwise uncertain, she may have been Licinia who divorced her father to marry Quintus Caecilius Metellus Nepos, in a scandal mentioned by several sources. Her name, Mucia Tertia, would suggest that she was a third daughter, according to the Roman naming convention for women, though it is believed that the choice of name was to differentiate her from her two aunts. If her mother was Licinia then Mucia had also two younger half-brothers from her mother's second marriage, Quintus Metellus Celer, consul in 60 BC, and Quintus Metellus Nepos, consul in 57 BC.

During her father's time as governor of the province of Asia in 95–94 BC, a statue in his honour was erected at Olympia. There is some evidence that a further statue was erected to his wife or daughter which, if it were indeed dedicated to Mucia, would make her the first woman to receive this honour, which later became usual for members of the imperial household.

== Marriages ==
Mucia was possibly first married to Gaius Marius the Younger, consul in 82 BC, at a very young age. (Note: The evidence for the marriage of Mucia Tertia to the Younger Marius occurs in Plutarch's Life of Marius (35:6–7), where the young man eludes capture from Sulla's supporters at the house of his father-in-law, the pontifex Quintus Mucius Scaevola. However, it is possible that the two were only engaged and the marriage was never entered into.) This was a time of civil war between the Marian regime at Rome and Lucius Cornelius Sulla. Following his defeat the Younger Marius committed suicide; if the marriage had gone ahead, this would have left Mucia a childless widow.

Following the victory of Lucius Cornelius Sulla Felix over Gaius Marius the Younger, Sulla, as Dictator, needed to secure Pompey's loyalty and to do that, he arranged the latter's marriage to Mucia around 79 BC. This marriage resulted in three children: elder son Gnaeus Pompeius, daughter Pompeia Magna (who married Faustus Cornelius Sulla) and younger son Sextus Pompey. She outlived all three of her children with Pompey.

Between 76 and 61 BC, Pompey spent most of the time away from Rome, campaigning in Hispania against Sertorius, in the Mediterranean Sea against the pirates, and in the East fighting King Mithridates VI of Pontus. On his return in 61, Pompey sent Mucia a letter of divorce. According to Cicero's personal correspondence, the motive was adultery – it is said that she was one of Julius Caesar's many affairs. However, Pompey's friendship and alliance with Caesar at the time could suggest that Pompey himself either did not regard this rumor as true or did not consider it important. The imperial biographer Suetonius stated that Pompey often referred to Caesar as "Aegisthus", the name of a Greek mythological character who was known to have seduced a king's wife. Mucia next married Marcus Aemilius Scaurus, a stepson of the dictator Sulla, with whom she had another son named Marcus. In 39 BC Mucia, at the earnest request of the Roman people, went to Sicily to mediate between her son Sextus Pompey and triumvir Octavian (the future emperor Augustus). This made her the first Roman woman recorded as fulfilling an official diplomatic role.

Mucia was alive at the time of the Battle of Actium in 31 BC, though her date of death is unknown. Octavian treated her with great respect.

== See also ==
- Mucia gens

== Sources ==
=== Primary sources ===
- Asconius, Pro Scauro, p. 19, Orelli-Baiter (ed.) (1845).
- Cicero, Epistulae ad Familiares, v. 2.
- Cicero, Epistulae ad Atticum, i. 12.
- Dio Cassius, xxxvii. 49, xlviii. 16, li. 2, lvi. 38.
- Appian, Bellum Civile v. 69, 72.
- Suetonius, Life of Julius Caesar, 50.
- Plutarch, Life of Pompey, 42.
- Zonaras, x. 5.
- Hieronymus, Adversus Jovinianum, i. 48.

=== Modern scholarship ===
- Bauman, Richard A. (2003) [1992]. Women and politics in Ancient Rome. London and New York: Routledge. ISBN 0-415-05777-9.
- Haley, Shelley (1985). "The Five Wives of Pompey the Great". Greece and Rome. 32 (1): 49–59. doi:10.1017/S0017383500030138. JSTOR 642299.
- Tanner, Jeremy (2000). "Portraits, Power, and Patronage in the Late Roman Republic". The Journal of Roman Studies. 90: 18–50. doi:10.2307/300199. JSTOR 300199.
- Tatum, Jeffrey (25 February 2014). The Patrician Tribune: Publius Clodius Pulcher. UNC Press Books. ISBN 9781469620657.
- Telford, Lynda (2014). Sulla: A Dictator Reconsidered. Barnsley: Pen & Sword Military. ISBN 9781783030484.
- Wiseman, Timothy Peter (1987). Catullus and His World: A Reappraisal. Cambridge University Press. ISBN 9780521319683.
