= Arch of Fabius =

Ancient Roman arch in Rome

The Arch of Fabius (Latin: Fornix Fabianus) was an ancient Roman arch located at the eastern end of the Roman Forum.

Built in 121 BCE by Quintus Fabius Maximus Allobrogicus to celebrate his victory over the Allobroges, it was the first triumphal arch built within or adjacent to the forum. Considered by the Romans as one of the boundaries of the Roman Forum, it traversed the Via Sacra and was located between the House of the Vestals and the Regia, most probably at the western end of the Regia. The arch was probably built of tufa and faced with travertine, and adorned with statues of Quintus Fabius and his family.

The arch was restored by Fabius's grandson in 57 BCE. Its fate after that is uncertain. Due to its location, as that part of the forum was repeatedly pillaged for building materials throughout the centuries, nothing of the arch remains. Although inscriptions from the Arch of Fabius were uncovered in 1540 and 1543, these have also been lost.
