= Battle of Lauro =

Battle in 45 BC

- Part of Caesar's Civil War
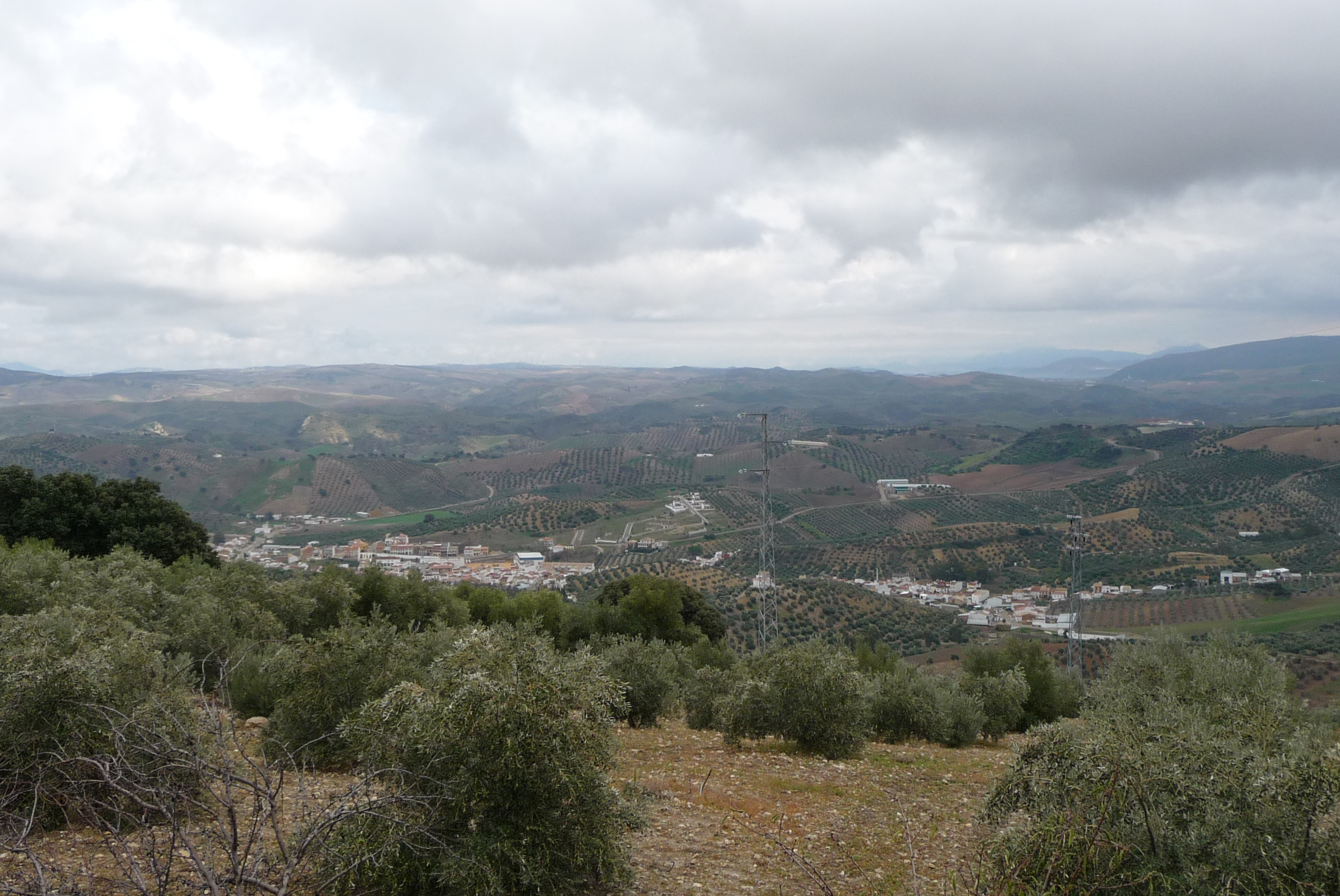
- The battle probably took place in the mountainous hinterland of Hispania Ulterior. Pictured is the area around Algámitas, not far from Lora de Estepa.
Date	Early April 45 BC
Location	Lauro (possibly modern-day Lora de Estepa) (Note: The identification of Lauro with Lora de Estepa is generally disputed, with Christoph F. Konrad even saying that Lauro might never have existed in the first place, instead being an invention of Florus. Most Historians, however, agree that the battle took place in Hispania Ulterior. A notable exception to this is M. Hadas, who argues that the battle took place near Valencia in Hispania Citerior.)
Result	Caesarian victory

Belligerents
Caesarians	Pompeians

Commanders and leaders
Lucius Caesennius Lento	Gnaeus Pompeius the Younger †

Units involved
Unknown	Survivors of Munda, including many Lusitanians

Strength
Many infantry and cavalry	Much fewer than the Caesarians

Casualties and losses
Unknown	Heavy

The Battle of Lauro (45 BC) was the last stand of Gnaeus Pompeius the Younger, son of Gnaeus Pompeius Magnus, against the followers of Julius Caesar during the civil war of 49–45 BC. After being defeated during the Battle of Munda, the younger Pompeius unsuccessfully attempted to flee Hispania Ulterior by sea, but was eventually forced to land. Pursued by Caesarian forces under Lucius Caesennius Lento, the Pompeians were cornered at a wooded hill near the town of Lauro, where most of them, including Pompeius the Younger, were killed in battle.

== Background ==
After the Battle of Munda, the badly wounded Pompeius fled to Carteia. The town was already embroiled in factional strife between local Pompeians and Caesarians, however, with the latter eventually launching a revolt, during which Gnaeus Pompeius was again wounded. The situation quickly turned against the Pompeians, whereupon they decided to board their remaining navy of twenty ships and escape to the sea. The Caesarian naval commander Gaius Didius, who was stationed at Gades, heard of the Pompeians' escape, and promptly set off in pursuit. Having left Carteia in great haste, Pompeius' men had not brought enough drinking water and thus were soon forced to land, allowing Didius to catch up with them after four days of sailing. The Caesarians attacked the Pompeian fleet at anchor, capturing some vessels and burning the rest, consequently trapping Pompeius and his followers in southern Spain.

== Battle ==
The Pompeians then attempted to flee over land, constantly pursued and harassed by Caesarian forces. In course of the flight, Pompeius the Younger was once more wounded, this time in the shoulder and left leg, so that his men had to carry him on a litter. The Pompeians eventually took refuge at a well defendable wooded hill near the town of Lauro, but they were discovered by a local, who reported them to the Caesarians. As result, Pompeius and his men were surrounded. The Caesarians, under command of Lucius Caesennius Lento, began to attack the Pompeian positions, but thanks to the natural conditions, the defenders were able to repulse multiple assaults. Thus thwarted, Lento's forces settled down to besiege and starve out the Pompeians. Recognizing this, the defenders resolved to try to break through the siege.

When the Pompeians began their breakout attempt, heavy and brutal fighting ensued, with the escaping defenders suffering heavy casualties. Several Pompeians, many of them Lusitanians, actually managed to escape, but not Gnaeus Pompeius himself. Unable to walk due to his wounds and not transportable by horse or litter because of the rough terrain, he could not flee quickly enough and together with several of his followers remained behind. With many Pompeians either gone or killed, the Caesarians then launched a renewed assault against the Pompeian position and overran the remaining defenders. Gnaeus Pompeius fled into a cave, but was discovered after some captives betrayed his hiding place, and, despite his wounds, fought to the death.

== Aftermath ==
Pompeius the Younger's head was then cut off and brought to Hispalis, where it was displayed to the local populace. Meanwhile, the Lusitanians who had escaped the battle rallied many of their tribal members and attacked the forces of Gaius Didius, who had set up a camp near the coast. Provoking Didius to sally out from his camp by setting fire to his landed ships, the Lusitanians ambushed and killed him and many of his men. Those who survived fled to their remaining ships and escaped to the sea. After Munda and Gnaeus Pompeius' death, Julius Caesar believed the Pompeians to be completely defeated in Spain, and consequently left only few forces there to mop up the remaining resistance when returning to Rome. Unlike his older brother, however, Sextus Pompey successfully evaded the Caesarian pursuers and actually rebuilt the Pompeian armies. By the time Caesar was assassinated in 44 BC, he had reconquered most of southern Spain for the Pompeian cause.

== Bibliography ==
- Unknown author, De Bello Hispaniensi, translation by William Alexander McDevitte and W. S. Bohn, published in 1869.
- Lucius Cassius Dio, Roman History, Book 42.
- Appian, Roman History. The Civil Wars, Book 2.
- Florus, Epitome of Roman history, Book 2.
- Lowe, Benedict J. (2002). "Sextus Pompeius and Spain: 46-44 BC". In Anton Powell; Kathryn Welch (eds.). Sextus Pompeius. London: Duckworth Overlook. pp. 65–102. ISBN 0-7156-3127-6.
- Konrad, Christoph F. (1994). Plutarch's Sertorius. Chapel Hill, North Carolina: University of North Carolina Press.
