= Lucius Caesennius Lento =

Roman politician, general and playwright

Lucius Caesennius Lento (fl. 1st century BC) was a Roman playwright and politician who was a supporter of Mark Antony.

== Biography ==
Of Etruscan descent, and a member of the gens Caesennia, Caesennius Lento was, according to Cicero, an actor who specialised in writing and performing tragedies.

Choosing to side with Julius Caesar during the civil wars of the late Republic, Caesennius Lento was appointed a Legatus under Caesar during Caesar's campaigns in Hispania in 45 BC. It was Lento who was the officer who killed Gnaeus Pompeius during the Battle of Lauro, some weeks after the Battle of Munda.

In June 44 BC, Caesennius Lento was one of the seven agrarian commissioners established under the Lex Antonia and appointed by Mark Antony to divide the available Ager publicus in Campania and Lentini among veteran soldiers and needy citizens. As a supporter of Mark Antony, he was criticized by Cicero in his Philippicae in 43 BC.

Lento was probably the great-grandfather of Lucius Caesennius Paetus, who was Roman consul in AD 61.

== Sources ==
- Broughton, T. Robert S., The Magistrates of the Roman Republic, Vol II (1951)
- Syme, Ronald, The Roman Revolution (1939)
