= Quintus Fabius Maximus (consul 45 BC) =

Ancient Roman statesman and general

Quintus Fabius Maximus (possibly Quintus Fabius Maximus Sanga) (died 31 December 45 BC) was a general and politician of the late Roman Republic who became suffect consul in 45 BC.

== Biography ==
Maximus was a member of the patrician gens Fabia. His father was Quintus Fabius Maximus, son of Quintus Fabius Maximus Allobrogicus, the consul in 121 BC. His great-grandfather, Quintus Fabius Maximus Aemilianus, was also a consul, serving in 145 BC.

He first came to notice in 59 BC when, together with Marcus Caelius Rufus, he prosecuted Gaius Antonius Hybrida for extortion in his province of Macedonia. Although Cicero served as lead counsel for the defense, Fabius Maximus and Caelius Rufus were successful. He was elected Curule aedile in 57 BC, during which time he restored the Fornix Fabianus (Arch of Fabius). Sometime prior to 48 BC, he was elected praetor. In 46 BC, he was one of Julius Caesar's legates who fought in the civil war. Maximus was sent by Caesar to Hispania along with Quintus Pedius in command of the troops sent from Sardinia to deal with the Pompeians, who were led by Gnaeus Pompeius.

Once there, they were unwilling to risk battle with Pompeius's superior numbers, and so remained encamped at Oculbo, waiting for Caesar to arrive in person. Joining Caesar, they defeated Pompeius at the Battle of Munda on March 17, 45 BC. After the victory, Caesar left Maximus to besiege the town of Munda, which he took and may have destroyed. He then marched against the town of Ursao.

He returned to Rome along with Caesar, and in reward for his service, after Caesar abdicated his sole consulship in September, he installed Maximus with Gaius Trebonius as suffect consuls on 1 October, 45 BC, the people following Caesar's wishes by voting in his candidates. When Maximus entered a theatre and his lictors asked for the audience members to stand, Anti-Caesarean citizens showed their displeasure, shouting "He is no consul". Maximus then celebrated his Roman triumph for his victories in Spain on October 13, 45 BC.

Fabius Maximus died on December 31, 45 BC — the last day of his consulship. According to Pliny the Elder, his death was remarkable because Fabius Maximus showed no symptoms of impending illness or death beforehand. He was replaced for the remaining hours of the year by Gaius Caninius Rebilus.

He had three children: Paullus Fabius Maximus, Africanus Fabius Maximus and Fabia Paullina, who married Marcus Titius.

== See also ==
- List of Roman consuls

== Sources ==
- T. Robert S. Broughton, The Magistrates of the Roman Republic, Vol II (1952).
- Holmes, T. Rice, The Roman Republic and the Founder of the Empire, Vol. III (1923).
- Syme, Ronald, The Roman Revolution, Clarendon Press, Oxford, (1939).
- Smith, W. Dictionary of Greek and Roman biography and mythology (1861).

Political offices
Preceded by Gaius Julius Caesar	Consul of the Roman Republic; 45 BC (suffect) with Gaius Trebonius	Succeeded by G. Caninius Rebilus
