= Marcus Aemilius Scaurus (son of Mucia) =

1st century BC Roman military officer

Marcus Aemilius Scaurus was the son of Marcus Aemilius Scaurus (Praetor 56 BC) and Mucia Tertia, former wife of Pompey the Great. Sextus Pompey was his half-brother.

He accompanied Sextus to Asia after the defeat of his fleet in Sicily by Octavian's general Marcus Agrippa. In 35 BC, he betrayed his brother to Marcus Antonius's generals.

After the Battle of Actium, Aemilius fell into the hands of Octavian but was able to escape death thanks to the intercession of his mother, Mucia.

Marcus Aemilius had a son, Mamercus, who distinguished himself as a poet and orator.
