= Marcus Lurius =

Roman military leader (fl. 40–31 BC)

Marcus Lurius (fl. 40–31 BC) was a Roman military commander who supported Octavian, the later emperor Augustus, in the civil wars of the late Republic. He saw conflict against both Sextus Pompeius and Marc Antony.

In 40 BC, Lurius was serving as governor of Sardinia when the island was invaded by Menas, one of Sextus Pompeius's commanders. Lurius at first routed his opponent, but was then himself the victim of an unexpected defeat by Menas in the ensuing pursuit. Lurius was forced to abandon the island and its two legions there. On 2 September 31 BC, at the naval Battle of Actium, Octavian entrusted Lurius with command of the right wing of the fleet.
