= Gnaeus Pompeius (consul 31 BC) =

Gnaeus Pompeius (Rufus) (died AD 14) was suffect consul in 31 BC, during the transitional period when Octavian, the future Augustus, was consolidating his powers as princeps.

A member of the plebeian gens Pompeia, he may have been one of the Pompeii Rufi, the son of Quintus Pompeius Rufus, and therefore the great-grandson of the dictator Sulla.

A senator, Gnaeus Pompeius was appointed suffect consul to replace Marcus Titius, and he held the office from October 1 through to December 31, 31 BC. Gnaeus Pompeius was also one of the Quindecimviri sacris faciundis, a priestly college, to which he belonged until his death in AD 14.

== Sources ==
- Broughton, T. Robert S., The Magistrates of the Roman Republic, Vol II (1951)
- Broughton, T. Robert S., The Magistrates of the Roman Republic, Vol III (1986)
- Syme, Ronald, The Roman Revolution (1939)

Political offices
Preceded by Marcus Titius as suffect	Roman consul 31 BC (suffect) with Augustus III	Succeeded by Augustus IV; Marcus Licinius Crassus
