= Pruna =

Pruna, Spain
- town
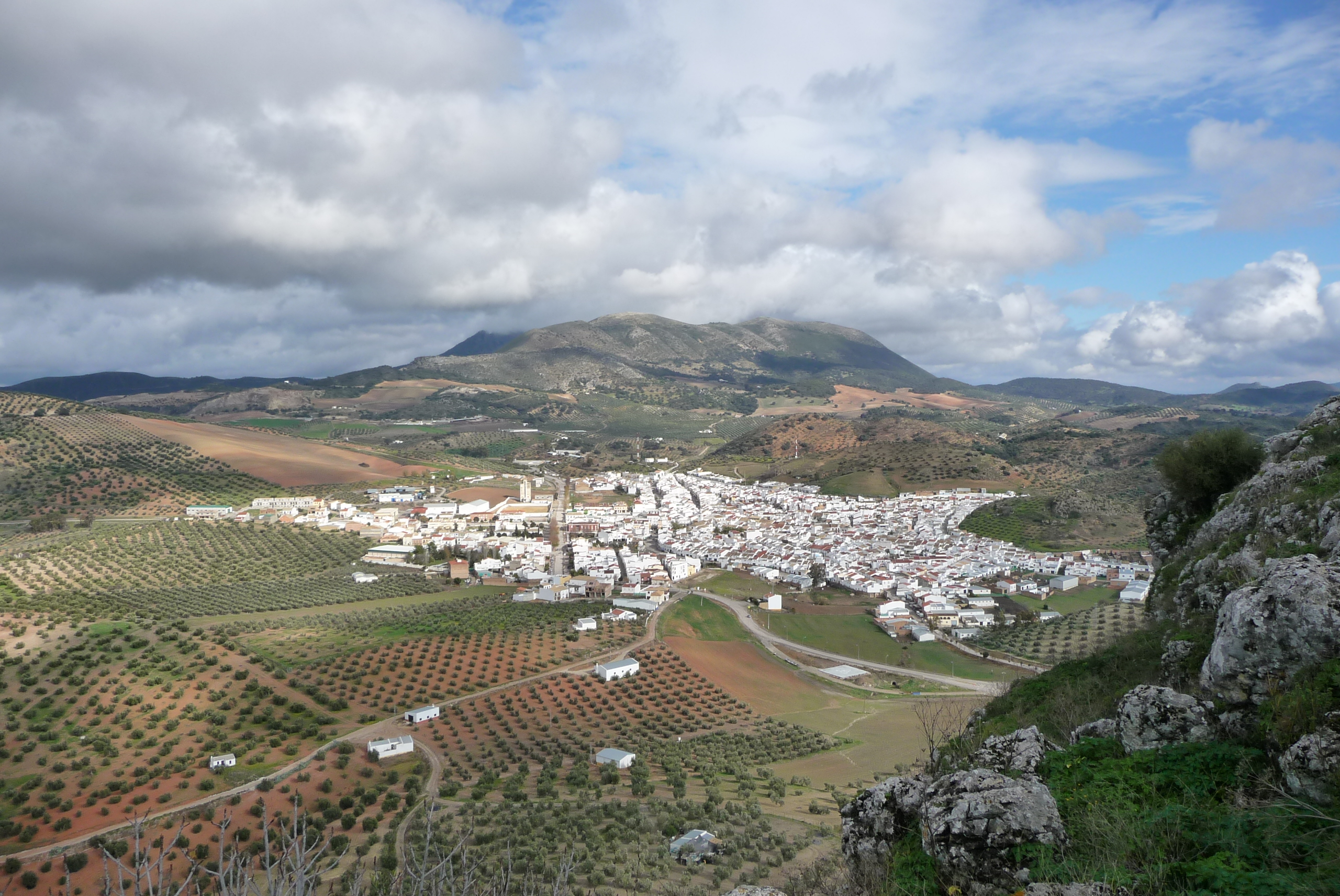
- Aerial view of Pruna town.

- Flag Coat of arms
- Interactive map of Pruna, Spain
- Coordinates: 36°58′N 5°13′W
- Country: Spain
- Province: Seville
- Municipality: Pruna

Area
  - Total: 100.64 km^{2} (38.86 sq mi)
- Elevation: 663 m (2,175 ft)

Population (2025-01-01)
  - Total: 2,461
  - Density: 24.45/km^{2} (63.33/sq mi)
- Time zone: UTC+1 (CET)
  - Summer (DST): UTC+2 (CEST)
- Website: www.pruna.es

Pruna is a town located in the province of Seville, Spain. According to the 2014 census (INE), the city has a population of 2.740 inhabitants.

== See also ==
- List of municipalities in Seville
