= Marcus Aemilius Scaurus (praetor 56 BC) =

Roman senator

Marcus Aemilius Scaurus (born c. 92 BC; fl. until 52 BC) was a Roman politician of the 1st century BC and son of Marcus Aemilius Scaurus and Caecilia Metella.

Initially a supporter of Pompey, Scaurus fought under his command during the Third Mithridatic War, and later governed Syria. Ascending the cursus honorum, he threw magnificent games while curule aedile and later served as praetor. Receiving as his province Sardinia, he was charged with extortion on his return to Rome but was successfully defended by many eminent senators. His bid for the consulship of 53 BC was unsuccessful; in 52 BC he was convicted of bribery during those elections and went into exile. His fall was perhaps due to his marriage with Mucia, a former wife of Pompey, with whom he fell out of favour as a result.

== Biography ==
Scaurus belonged to the important patrician gens Aemilia; he was the son of his homonymous father and Caecilia Metella. His famous father had served in the consulship of 115 BC and, from that year to his death, as princeps senatus. His father died in 88 BC during Scaurus' childhood. Pompey the Great was briefly married to his sister Aemilia and, even after her death, Pompey continued to take personal interest in the young man.

=== Third Mithridatic War ===
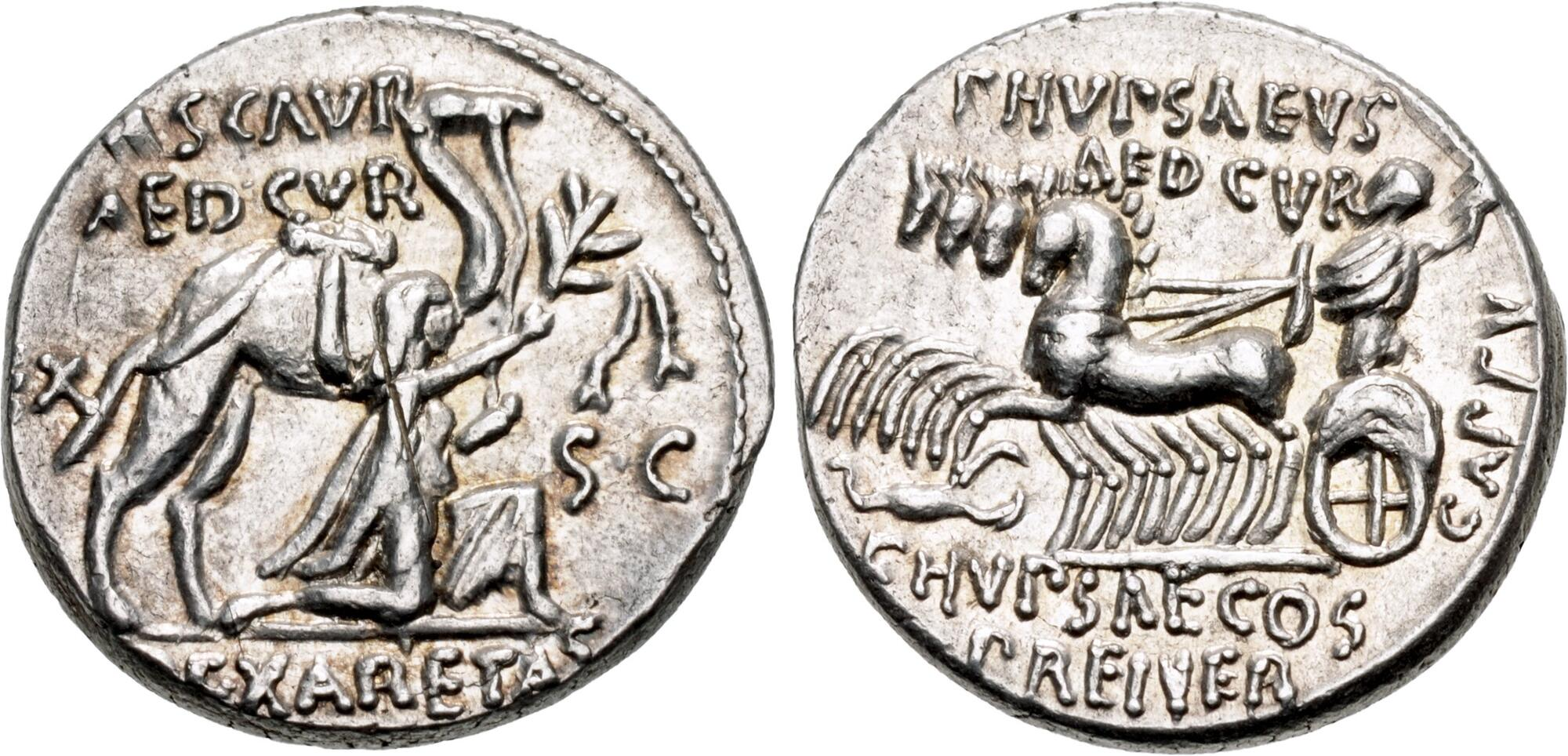
Denarius minted by Scaurus and Hypsaeus in 58 BC. The scene on the obverse depicts the surrender of Aretas III of Nabataea to Scaurus.

In 66 BC, during the Third Mithridatic War, Scaurus may have served as quaestor. By 65 or 64 BC, Scaurus was appointed proquaestor in Syria under Pompey's overall command of the war.

Roman intervention in Syria started when Pompey moved to deal with aggression from Nabataean king Aretas III. Pompey, however, was also engaged to intervene in a dispute between the rival claimants to Judaea: Hyrcanus and Aristobulus. After Aretas intervened to favour Hyrcanus in Judaea, Scaurus headed embassy where he sided with Aristobulus and ordered Aretas to withdraw. This preceded direct intervention by Pompey, who marched south in the autumn of 64 BC when Aristobulus had started to win the conflict. Pompey eventually made Hyrcanus high priest and ethnarch in Judaea and had Aristobulus sent to Rome in chains.

When Pompey returned north to settle treat with Pharnaces in 63 BC, he left Syria organised as a province from lands carved out of the Seleucid Empire, under Scaurus as governor pro praetore with two legions. Scaurus moved to campaign against Aretas, but in 62 BC ended his campaign after accepting Aretas' nominal submission and payment of three hundred talents to Scaurus. At the close of 61 BC, Scaurus was succeeded in Syria by Lucius Marcius Philippus.

Scaurus' engagements in Syria and Judaea may be mentioned in Dead Sea Scroll 4Q333 (fragmentary) which states:

[in (the week of) Je]hezekel which is ... Aemilius killed ... [in] the seventh [mon]th ... (the week of) Gamul ... Aemilius killed ...

He was said by Pliny the Elder to have been the first Roman collector, or major collector, of engraved gems.

=== Curule aedile and praetor ===
Scaurus returned to Rome and – eligible due to his patrician status – was elected curule aedile a few years later, in 58 BC, with Publius Plautius Hypsaeus as his colleague. Together, they minted denarii showing the scene of the surrender of the Nabataean king Aretas III to Scaurus. The massive production of these coins was nevertheless not linked to the extravagant games – funded by his wealth acquired in Syria – he gave that year as aedile. During the year, he restored an ornament placed by his father on the Temple of Jupiter Optimus Maximus that had been damaged by fire in 83 BC; he also erected the theatrum Scauri, a magnificent wooden theatre with three levels and seats for eighty thousand spectators.

By 57 BC, he had been elevated to the college of pontiffs.

He served as praetor in 56 BC, during which he presided over the quaestio de vi and the trial of Publius Sestius. He received Sardinia as his province for 55 BC, probably pro consule.

=== Consular attempt and exile ===
After returning from Sardinia, he received the support of Julius Caesar and Pompey in the canvass for the consulship of 53 BC, but was immediately accused of extortion in his province on his return on 6 July 54 BC. Scaurus was defended by a glittering array of senior statesmen – Cicero, Quintus Hortensius, Marcus Calidius, and Marcus Claudius Marcellus gave speeches in his defence; nine former consuls, including Pompey, and a sitting quaestor testified to his character – in a trial before Cato the Younger. and was overwhelmingly acquitted on 2 September 54 BC in spite of his probable guilt.

The candidates supported by the Triumvirs (Julius Caesar, Pompey and Crassus), Scaurus included, were defeated in the canvass for the consulship of 53 BC. After the elections, he – severally with the other candidates – was hauled before the courts for ambitus (electoral bribery) some time before 11 October 54 BC, but proceedings were incomplete. Two years later, some time in 52 BC, Scaurus was again prosecuted de ambitu, possibly in a continuation of the first prosecution. Cicero again attempted to defend him and a mob assembled to protest the prosecution, but Pompey sent men to disperse the mob and Scaurus was convicted. Pompey's hostility may have been for Scaurus' marriage to Pompey's former wife Mucia. Scaurus was then expelled from the senate and thence went into exile. Nothing is known of his further fate.

== Issue ==
Scaurus had one child of the same name with his wife Mucia, who had previously been married to Pompey the Great. This younger Scaurus sided with Antony during the War of Actium but was pardoned at Mucia's request.

== See also ==
- Siege of Jerusalem (63 BC)
