= Aulus Caecina =

Roman writer and critic of Julius Caesar

Aulus Caecina the son of Aulus Caecina, was a member of a prominent family of Etruscan origin in Ancient Rome, and an Ancient Roman writer.

He took the side of Pompey in the civil wars, and published a violent tirade against Caesar, for which he was banished. He recanted in a work called Querelae, and was pardoned in the mid 40s BCE by Caesar following the intercession of his friends, above all, Cicero, who had defended his father in 69 BCE with the speech Pro Caecina.

Caecina was regarded as an important authority on the Etruscan system of divination (Etrusca Disciplina), which he endeavoured to place on a scientific footing by harmonizing its theories with the doctrines of the Stoics.

Considerable fragments of his work (dealing with lightning) are to be found in Seneca (Naturales quaestiones, ii. 31–49). Caecina was on intimate terms with Cicero, who speaks of him as a gifted and eloquent man and was no doubt considerably indebted to him in his own treatise De Divinatione. Some of their correspondence is preserved in Cicero's letters (Epistulae ad Familiares vi. 5–8; see also ix. and xiii. 66).

== See also ==
- Caecinia gens
