= Algámitas =

- Municipality
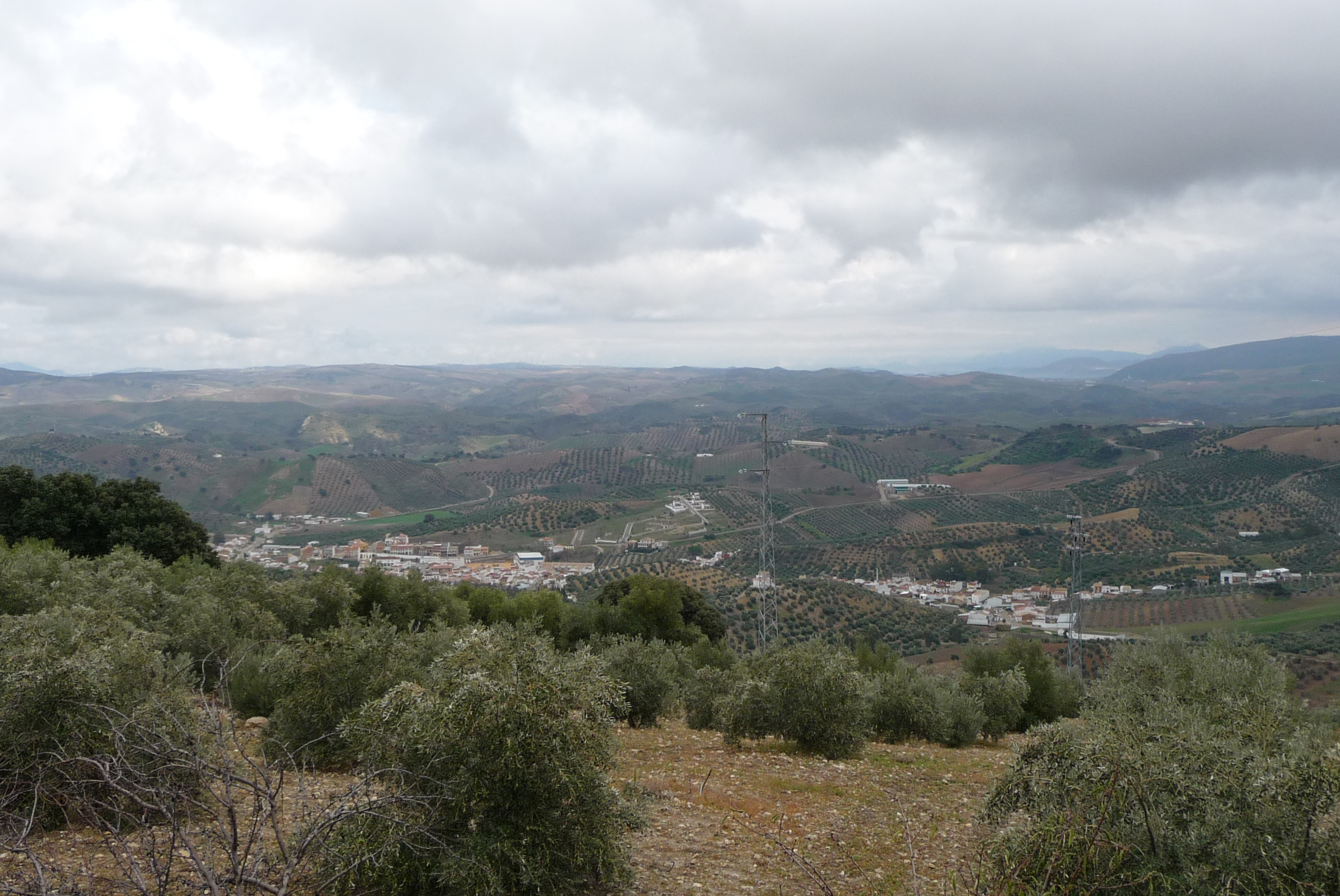

- Coat of arms

- Location in Spain
- Coordinates: 37°1′N 5°9′W
- Country: Spain
- Community: Andalusia
- Province: Seville
- Comarca: Sierra Sur de Sevilla

Government
  - Alcaldesa: Isabel María Romero Gómez

Area
  - Total: 20.42 km^{2} (7.88 sq mi)
- Elevation: 447 m (1,467 ft)

Population (2025-01-01)
  - Total: 1,258
  - Density: 61.61/km^{2} (159.6/sq mi)
- Demonym: Algamiteños
- Time zone: UTC+1 (CET)
  - Summer (DST): UTC+2 (CEST)
- Postal code: 41661

Algámitas (Spanish pronunciation: [alˈɣamitas]) is a municipality in the province of Seville, Andalusia, southern Spain. It is located some 110 kilometers from Seville.

== See also ==
- List of municipalities in Seville
