= Pro Caecina =

Speech by Marcus Tullius Cicero

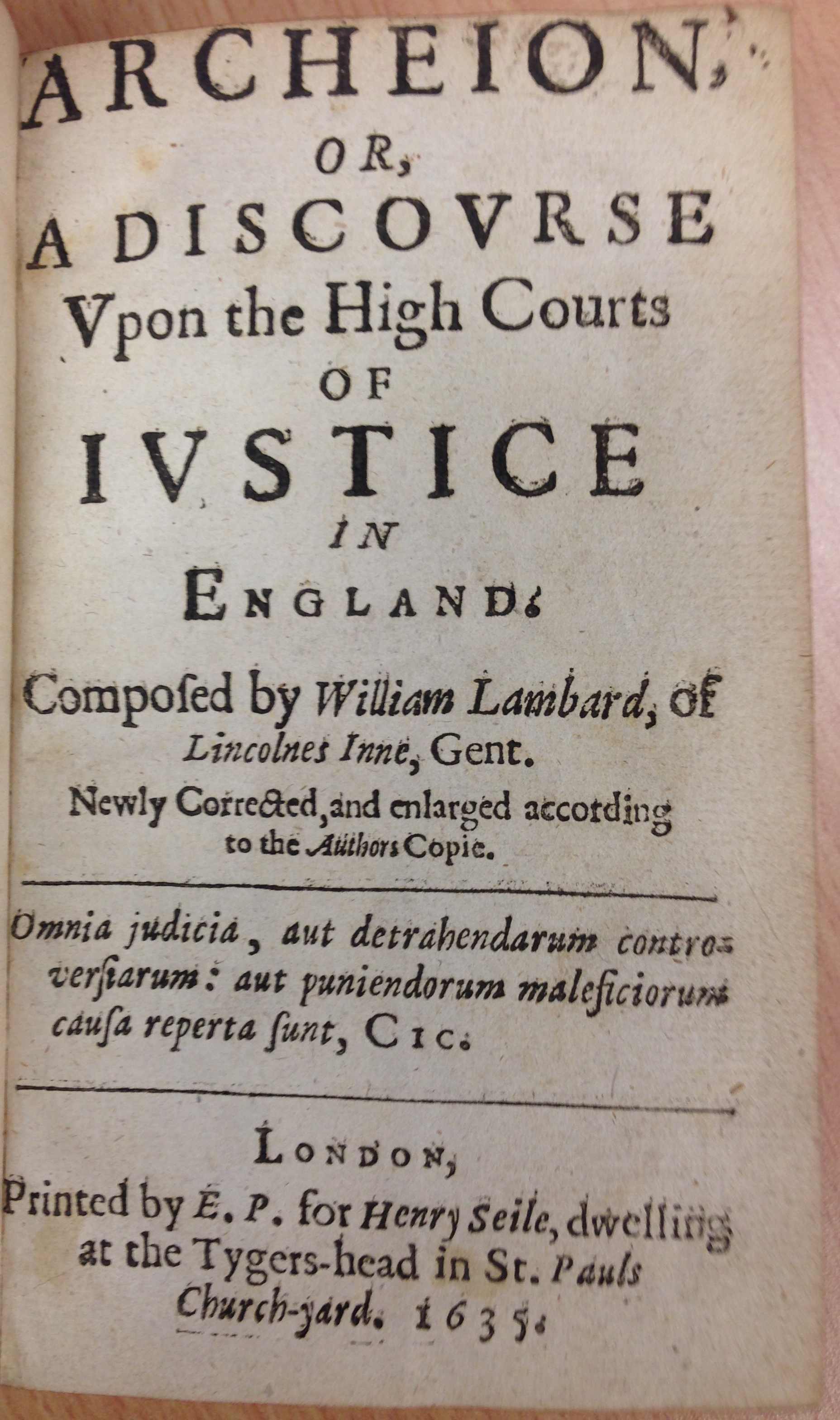
Cover of William Lambarde's Archeion (1635), which quotes from Pro Caecina: "All judicial proceedings have been devised either for the sake of putting an end to disputes, or of punishing crimes."

The Pro Caecina is a public speech made by Marcus Tullius Cicero on behalf of his friend Aulus Caecina sometime between 71 BC and 69 BC. The speech was delivered in the third hearing of a lawsuit where Caecina averred that he had been unlawfully dispossessed of a farm by use of force. Known for its refinement and scathing characterisations of the opposing parties, the speech is a good study in how rhetorical advocacy can occlude legal argument.
