= Gnaeus Pompeius Magnus (son of Pompey) =

Roman senator and general

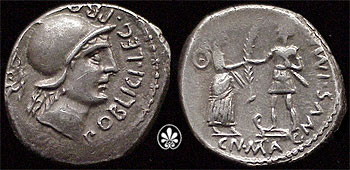
- Denarius of Gnaeus Pompeius Magnus the Younger, 46-45 BC

Personal details
- Born: c. 75 BC
- Died: 12 April 45 BC (aged 30) Lauro, Hispania Ulterior
- Cause of death: Killed in battle
- Relations: Pompeia gens
- Parent(s): Pompey Magnus and Mucia Tertia

Military service
- Allegiance: Pompey
- Rank: Legatus
- Battles/wars: Caesar's Civil War; Siege of Dyrrhachium; Battle of Pharsalus; Battle of Ascurum; Battle of Munda; Battle of Lauro †

Gnaeus Pompeius Magnus (c. 75 BC – 12 April 45 BC) was a Roman politician and general from the late Republic (1st century BC).

== Biography ==
Gnaeus Pompeius Magnus was the elder son of Pompey the Great (Gnaeus Pompeius Magnus) by his third wife, Mucia Tertia. Both he and his younger brother Sextus Pompey grew up in the shadow of their father, one of Rome's best generals and not originally a conservative politician who drifted to the more traditional faction when Julius Caesar became a threat. When Caesar crossed the Rubicon in 49 BC, thus starting a civil war, Gnaeus followed his father in their escape to the East, as did most of the conservative senators. Pompey's army lost the Battle of Pharsalus in 48 BC, and Pompey himself had to run for his life, only to be murdered in Egypt on 29 September the same year.

After the murder, Gnaeus and his brother Sextus joined the resistance against Caesar in the Africa Province. Together with Metellus Scipio, Cato and other senators, they prepared to oppose Caesar and his army to the end. Here however Cato chastised Gnaeus, saying his father had achieved much more at his age than Gnaeus had. This prompted Gnaeus to launch a solo attack on Mauretania however he was defeated at the Battle of Ascurum. Gnaeus fled to the Balearic Islands, where he was joined by Sextus following Caesar's defeat of Metellus Scipio and Cato, who subsequently committed suicide, at the Battle of Thapsus in 46 BC. Together with Titus Labienus, former general in Caesar's army, the Pompey brothers crossed over to Hispania (the Iberian Peninsula, comprising modern Spain and Portugal), where they raised yet another army.

Caesar soon followed and, on 17 March 45 BC, the armies met in the Battle of Munda. Both armies were large and led by able generals. The battle was closely fought, but eventually a cavalry charge by Caesar turned events to his side. In the battle and the panicked escape that followed, Titus Labienus and an estimated 30,000 men of the Pompeian side died. Gnaeus and Sextus managed to escape another time but supporters were difficult to find. It was by now clear Caesar had won the civil war. Within a few weeks, Gnaeus Pompeius was cornered and killed by Lucius Caesennius Lento.

His younger brother Sextus Pompeius was able to keep one step ahead of his enemies, and survived his brother for another decade by establishing a semi-independent kingdom in Sicily with a powerful naval fleet, becoming so powerful he had to be accommodated by the Second Triumvirate until Augustus sent his general Marcus Agrippa who fought the Bellum Siculum with Sextus who was eventually defeated and executed.

== Marriage ==
Gnaeus Pompeius married Claudia Pulcra, daughter of Appius Claudius Pulcher and sister of Marcus Junius Brutus' first wife, who survived him; they had no children.
