= Menas (freedman) =

1st-century BCE freedman of Pompey and admiral to his son Sextus

Menas, also known as Menodorus (Μηνόδωρος) (died 35 BC), served under Sextus Pompey during the 1st Century BC Roman civil wars.

Menas was a freedman of Pompey the Great and when Pompey's son, Sextus, set himself up as ruler of Sicily in the late 40s BC, Menas became one of his naval leaders. He captured Sardinia in 40 BC for Sextus, driving out Octavian's governor Marcus Lurius.

The biographer Plutarch relates how during a banquet aboard Sextus Pompey's flagship at the time of the Pact of Misenum (39 BC) with the triumvirs Octavian, Mark Antony and Lepidus aboard, Menas suggested to Sextus Pompey:

"...Shall I," said he, "cut the cables and make you master not of Sicily only and Sardinia, but of the whole Roman empire?" - Plutarch, Parallel Lives, 'Life of Antony'

However, Sextus told him that he should have done it without asking him because he now could not break his treaty oath made to the triumvirs.

In 38 BC Menas surrendered Sardinia to Octavian and received equestrian rank as a reward. He fought for Octavian under Calvisius Sabinus in the naval battle off Cumae. In 36 BC he returned to Sextus Pompey, but Sextus had him closely watched and Menas, unhappy with being treated with suspicion, again changed sides.

He was killed in the Illyrian campaign of 35 BC.

Menas appears as a character in William Shakespeare's play Antony and Cleopatra.
