= Battle of Munda =

Final battle of Caesar's Civil War in present-day southern Spain, 45 BC

- Part of Caesar's Civil War
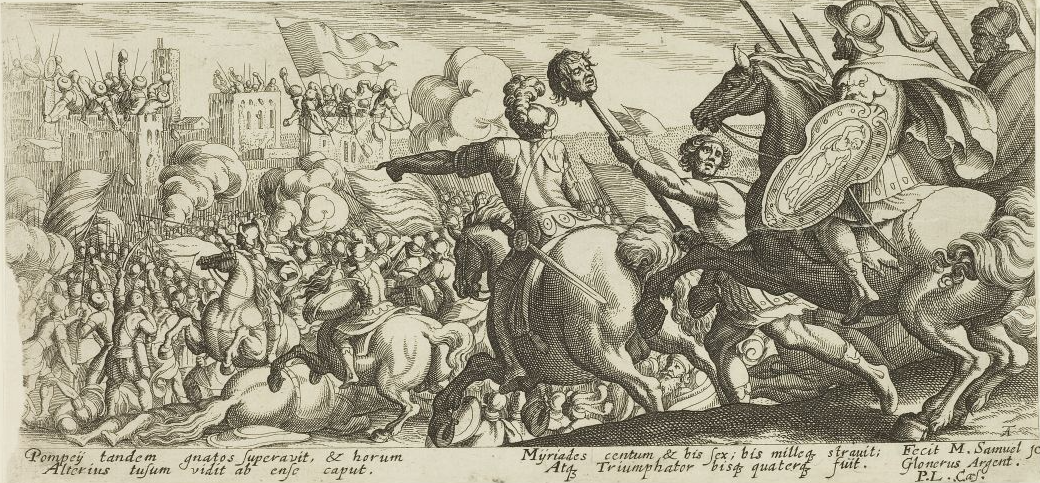
- Battle of Munda (engraving by Matthäus Merian, cca 1625)
Date	17 March 45 BC
Location	Campus Mundensis, probably near La Lantejuela, Andalusia, modern southern Spain 37.3500°N 5.2167°W
Result	Caesarian-Mauretanian victory

Belligerents
Caesarians; Mauretania	Pompeians

Commanders and leaders
Julius Caesar; Quintus Fabius Maximus; Quintus Pedius; Gaius Caninius Rebilus; Bogud of Mauretania	Gnaeus Pompeius Magnus †; Sextus Pompeius; Titus Labienus †; Publius Attius Varus †

Strength
8 legions, 8,000 cavalry, auxiliaries unknown Total: c. 50,000−60,000 (Note: Caesar claimed to have 40,000 men, while modern estimates place the number between 50,000 and 60,000)	13 legions, cavalry and auxiliaries Total: c. 70,000

Casualties and losses
1,000 killed or missing 500 wounded	30,000 killed

The Battle of Munda (17 March 45 BC), in southern Hispania Ulterior, was the final battle of Caesar's civil war against the leaders of the Optimates. With the military victory at Munda and the deaths of Titus Labienus and Gnaeus Pompeius (eldest son of Pompey), Caesar was politically able to return in triumph to Rome, and then govern as the elected Roman dictator. Subsequently, the assassination of Julius Caesar furthered the long Republican decline that led to the Roman Empire, initiated with the reign of the emperor Augustus.

== Prelude ==
The republicans had initially been led by Pompey, until the Battle of Pharsalus in 48 BC and Pompey's death soon afterwards. However, in April 46 BC, Caesar's forces destroyed the Pompeian army at the Battle of Thapsus.

After this, military opposition to Caesar was confined to Hispania (the Iberian Peninsula, comprising modern Spain and Portugal). During the Spring of 46 BC, two legions in Hispania Ulterior, largely formed by former Pompeian veterans enrolled in Caesar's army, had declared themselves for Gnaeus Pompeius (son of Pompey the Great) and driven out Caesar's proconsul. Soon they were joined by the remnants of the Pompeian army. These forces were commanded by the brothers Gnaeus and Sextus Pompeius (sons of Pompey), Publius Attius Varus and by the talented general Titus Labienus, who had been one of the most trusted of Caesar's generals during the Gallic Wars. Using the resources of the province, they were able to raise an army of four legions. These were the two original veteran legions, a legion formed from the survivors of Thapsus, and an additional legion recruited from Roman citizens and local inhabitants. They took control of almost all Hispania Ulterior, including the important Roman colonies of Italica and Corduba (the capital of the province). Caesar's generals Quintus Fabius Maximus and Quintus Pedius did not risk a battle, and remained encamped at Obulco (present-day Porcuna), about 35 miles (56 km) east of Corduba, requesting help from Caesar.

Caesar's campaign to Munda

Thus, Caesar was forced to move from Rome to Hispania to deal with the Pompeius brothers. He brought three trusted veteran legions (X Equestris, V Alaudae and VI Ferrata) and one of the newer legions III Gallica, but in the main was forced to rely on the recruits already present in Hispania. Caesar covered the 1,500 miles (2,400 km) from Rome to Obulco in less than one month, arriving in early December (he immediately wrote a short poem, Iter, describing this journey). Caesar had called for his great-nephew Octavian to join him, but due to his health, Octavian was only able to reach him after the conclusion of the campaign.

=== Ulia ===
When Caesar arrived in Hispania Baetica the Pompeians were laying siege to Ulia (one of the few towns which had remained loyal to Caesar). Lucius Vibius Paciaecus, one of his officers who was known to the Ulians and knew the area, was sent with six cohorts (2,000-3,000 legionaries) to reinforce the defenders. Caesar himself marched his main army on Corduba hoping to draw the Pompeians from Ulia. Paciaecus arrived near Ulia during the night just when a storm swept in. Using the darkness and the rain Paciaecus marched his men through the Pompeian lines; the sentries, unable to recognize the legionary symbols, let them pass. Paciaecus slipped his men into the city, reinforcing the defenders.

=== Corduba ===
While Ulia was being reinforced, Caesar marched on towards Corduba, which was defended by Sextus Pompeius and a strong garrison. En route, Caesar's vanguard clashed with Sextus' cavalry, alerting the Pompeians to his presence. Sextus sent word to his brother that Caesar was near Corduba and requested reinforcements. Gnaeus gave up the siege of Ulia and marched to his brother's aid with the entire Pompeian army. Sextus had blocked or destroyed the bridge to Corduba across the Baetis. Caesar constructed a makeshift bridge and marched his army across, setting up camp near Corduba. Soon Gnaeus and Labienus arrived with the Pompeian army. Fierce skirmishes were fought on the bridge, with both sides losing many men. Caesar was looking for a decisive engagement and this was not going to be it. So during one night Caesar's army slipped out of their camp and after a daring river crossing they marched on Ategua.

=== Ategua ===
After arriving at the fortified city of Ategua, Caesar began besieging it, building several camps around it. Gnaeus and Labienus marched their army around Caesar's positions, hoping to surprise him by coming in from an unexpected direction. They approached under the cover of a thick fog, surprising a number of Caesar's pickets. When the fog lifted, it became clear Caesar had taken all the highground around the city and was entrenched very well. Building a camp to the west (between Caesar and Ucubi), they tried to come up with a plan to dislodge their opponent from his superior position. They launched an attack on the camp of Postumius and the XXVIII, but were repulsed when Caesar sent the V, VI and X to aid their comrades. The following day Caesar was reinforced by his allies, most notably king Bogud of West-Mauretania. Under Labienus’ advice, Gnaeus Pompeius decided to avoid an open battle, and Caesar was forced to wage a winter campaign, while procuring food and shelter for his army. In early 45 BC, the pro-Caesarian faction in Ategua offered to surrender the city to Caesar, but when the Pompeian garrison found out, they executed the pro-Caesarian leaders. The garrison tried to fight their way through Caesar's lines some time after the incident, but were beaten back. The city surrendered soon after; this was an important blow to the Pompeian confidence and morale, and some of the native allies started to desert to Caesar.

=== Salsum and Soricaria ===
After taking Ategua, Caesar started building a camp near the Pompeian camp across the River Salsum. Gnaeus attacked quickly, catching Caesar off guard. The heroic actions and sacrifice of two centurions of the V stabilized the line. After this setback, Caesar decided to retreat to Sorecaria, cutting off one of the Pompeian supply lines. Another skirmish near Soricaria on March 7 went in Caesar's favor; many Romans in the Pompeian camp began planning to defect, and Gnaeus Pompeius was forced to abandon his delaying tactics and offer battle. He broke camp and marched his army south towards the town of Munda.

== Battle ==
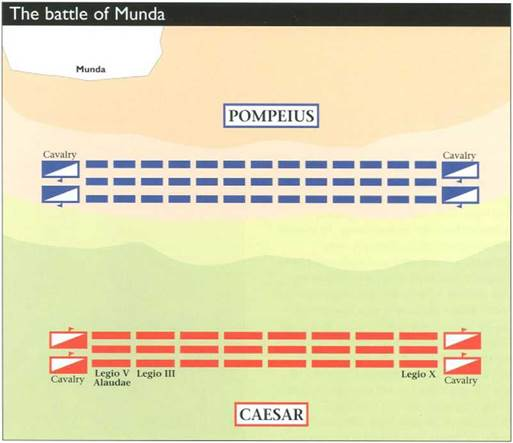
Initial troop deployment of the battle

The two armies met in the plains of Munda in southern Spain. The Pompeian army was situated on a gentle hill, less than one mile (1.6 km) from the walls of Munda, in a defensible position. Caesar led a total of eight legions (Legio II, III, V, VI, X, XXI, XXVIII and XXX), with 8,000 horsemen and an unknown number of light infantry, while Pompeius commanded thirteen legions, 6,000 light-infantrymen, and about 6,000 horsemen. Many of the Republican soldiers had already surrendered to Caesar in previous campaigns and had then deserted his army to rejoin Pompeius; they would fight with desperation, fearing that they would not be pardoned a second time (indeed Caesar had executed prisoners at his last major victory, at Thapsus). After an unsuccessful ploy designed to lure the Pompeians down the hill, Caesar ordered a frontal attack (with the watchword "Venus", the goddess reputed to be his ancestor).

The fighting lasted for 8 hours without a clear advantage for either side, causing the generals to leave their commanding positions and join the ranks. As Caesar himself later said he had fought many times for victory, but at Munda he had to fight for his life. Caesar took command of his right wing, where his favorite Legio X Equestris was involved in heavy fighting. With Caesar's inspiration the tenth legion began to push back Pompeius' forces. Aware of the danger, Gnaeus Pompeius removed a legion from his own right wing to reinforce the threatened left wing, which was a critical mistake. As soon as the Pompeian right wing was thus weakened, Caesar's cavalry launched a decisive attack, which turned the course of the battle. King Bogud and his Mauretanian cavalry attacked the Pompeian right breaking through the flank and attacking the rear of the Pompeian army. Titus Labienus, commander of the Pompeian cavalry, saw this manoeuvre and moved some troops to intercept them.

The Pompeian army misinterpreted the situation. Already under heavy pressure on both the left (from Legio X) and right wings (the cavalry charge), they thought Labienus was retreating. The Pompeian legions broke their lines and fled in disorder. Although some were able to find refuge within the walls of Munda, many more were killed in the rout. At the end of the battle there were about 30,000 Pompeians dead on the field; Caesar claimed to have lost only 1,000, but his real casualties were likely higher. All thirteen standards of the Pompeian legions were captured, a sign of complete disbandment. Titus Labienus and Attius Varus died on the field and were granted a burial by Caesar, while Gnaeus Pompeius managed to escape from the battlefield.

== Aftermath ==
Caesar left his legate Quintus Fabius Maximus to besiege Munda, and moved to pacify the province. Corduba surrendered: men in arms present in the town (mostly armed slaves) were executed, and the city was forced to pay a heavy indemnity. The city of Munda held out for some time, but, after an unsuccessful attempt to break the siege, surrendered, with 14,000 prisoners taken. Gaius Didius, a naval commander loyal to Caesar, hunted down most of the Pompeian ships. Gnaeus Pompeius looked for refuge on land, but was cornered during the Battle of Lauro and killed.

Although Sextus Pompeius remained at large, after Munda there were no more conservative armies challenging Caesar's dominion. Upon his return to Rome, according to Plutarch, the "triumph which he celebrated for this victory displeased the Romans beyond any thing. For he had not defeated foreign generals, or barbarian kings, but had destroyed the children and family of one of the greatest men of Rome." Caesar was made dictator for life, though his success was short-lived; Caesar was murdered on March 15 of the following year (44 BC) by the next generation of statesmen, led by Brutus and Cassius.

== Localization ==
The exact location of Munda has long been a matter of debate.

Some Spanish historians asserted that Munda was the Roman name for modern-day Ronda, where the battle of Munda may have been fought. Other early researchers localized the battle in various other places, e.g. near Monda or Montilla, the latter having been proposed on the basis of an earlier localization attempt that was only meant to honor a member of the French royal house, who was born in Montilla.

It is a matter of civic pride in Montilla that the Battle of Munda was (according to them) fought nearby, and at the outset of Hispanist Prosper Mérimée's novella Carmen, source of Georges Bizet's opera, the narrator clearly states that his research indicates that Munda was near Montilla (no reference to either Munda or Montilla is found in Bizet's opera).

Other experts have asserted that Munda was fought just outside Osuna, in the province of Seville. This was supported by ancient slingshot bullets that were excavated near La Lantejuela, halfway between Osuna and Écija. The theory is further supported by ancient inscriptions found in Écija and Osuna that honor the town of Astigi (Écija) for standing firmly on Caesar's side during the battle. Therefore, the Battle of Munda probably took place on the Cerro de las Balas and the Llanos del Aguila near La Lantejuela.

== Primary sources ==
- Appian, Roman Civil Wars. Book 2: 103–105
- Cassio, Dio. Roman History. Book 47: 28–42
- Caesar, Julius, Commentarius De Bello Hispaniensi, 1–42.
- Plutarch, Fall of the Roman Republic: Caesar, 56
