= Sextus Pompey =

Roman politician and general (c. 67–35 BC)

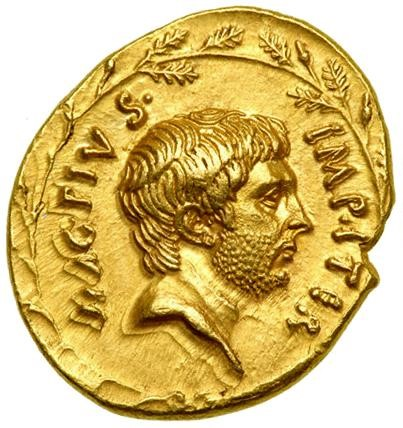
- Aureus of Sextus Pompeius, 42–40 BC, minted in Sicily

Personal details
- Born: c. 67 BC
- Died: 35 BC (aged around 32) Miletus, Asia, Roman Republic
- Spouse: Scribonia (Note: Appian appears to mistakenly call Pompey's wife "Julia". The historian may have actually been referring to Mark Antony's mother Julia (who sheltered with Pompey for a time) in the passage.)
- Children: Pompeia
- Parents: Pompey (father); Mucia Tertia (mother)
- Relatives: Gnaeus Pompeius (brother); Pompeia Magna (sister)

Military service
- Rank: Prefect of the fleet and the coast Governor of Sicily and Sardinia
- Battles/wars: Caesar's civil war Bellum Siculum

Sextus Pompeius Magnus Pius (c. 67 – 35 BC), also known in English as Sextus Pompey, was a Roman military leader who, throughout his life, upheld the cause of his father, Pompey the Great, against Julius Caesar and his supporters during the last civil wars of the Roman Republic.

Sextus Pompey formed the last organized opposition to the Second Triumvirate, in defiance of which he succeeded in establishing an independent state in Sicily for several years.

== Biography ==
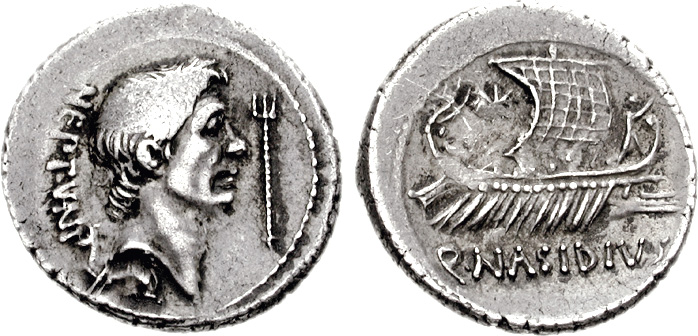
Denarius by Sextus Pompeius. 44–43 BC. AR Denarius (3.85 g, 3h). Massilia (Gaul) mint. Q. Nasidius, moneyer. Bare head of Pompey the Great right; trident before, dolphin below / Ship sailing right; star above.

Sextus Pompeius was the younger son of Gnaeus Pompeius Magnus (Pompey the Great) by his third wife, Mucia Tertia. His sister was Pompeia and his elder brother was Gnaeus Pompeius. Both boys grew up in the shadow of their father, one of Rome's greatest generals and an originally non-conservative politician who drifted to the more traditional faction when Julius Caesar became a threat.

When Caesar crossed the Rubicon in 49 BC, thus starting a civil war, Sextus' older brother Gnaeus followed their father in his escape to the East, as did most of the conservative senators. Sextus stayed in Rome in the care of his stepmother, Cornelia Metella. Pompey's army lost the Battle of Pharsalus in 48 BC and Pompey himself had to run for his life. Cornelia and Sextus met him in the island of Lesbos and together they fled to Egypt. Upon arrival, Sextus watched his father being killed by treachery on 29 September of the same year. After the murder, Cornelia returned to Rome; in the following years, Sextus joined the resistance against Caesar in the African provinces. Together with Metellus Scipio, Cato the Younger, his brother Gnaeus and other senators, they prepared to oppose Caesar and his army to the end.

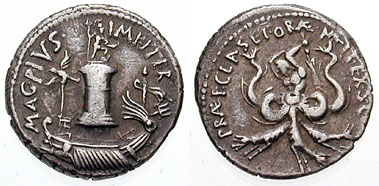
A Sextus Pompeius denarius, minted for his victory over Octavian's fleet. On the obverse is the Pharos of Messina, on the reverse the monster Scylla.

Caesar won the first battle at Thapsus in 46 BC against Metellus Scipio and Cato, who committed suicide. In 45 BC, Caesar managed to defeat the Pompeius brothers in the Battle of Munda, in Hispania (the Iberian Peninsula, comprising modern Spain and Portugal), after what he himself described as his hardest fought victory ever. Gnaeus Pompeius would soon die in a last stand at Lauro, but young Sextus escaped once more, this time to Sicily, and thereafter raised another dissident army in Spain.

Back in Rome, Julius Caesar was killed on the Ides of March (15 March) 44 BC by a group of senators led by Gaius Cassius and Marcus Brutus. This incident did not lead to a return to normality, but provoked yet another civil war between Caesar's political heirs and his killers. One of the latter, Decimus Brutus, wrote to M. Brutus and to Cassius that March that "we have nowhere to base ourselves, except for Sex. Pompeius". In the immediate aftermath of the assassination, Cassius and Brutus advised that Sextus be recalled to Rome. After Caesar's funeral, Antony also moved that Sextus be recalled to Rome, as well as be paid 50 million Attic drachmas in return for his father's stolen property and be given command of the entire Roman navy, which Sextus accepted. However, Sextus only got as far as Massilia before he returned to Sicily. Early in 43, the Senate commended Marcus Aemelius Lepidus for forging an alliance with Sextus against the Caesarians; but thereafter Lepidus joined the Second Triumvirate formed by Gaius Julius Caesar Octavianus and Marcus Antonius, with the intention of avenging Caesar and subduing all other parties. The Triumvirs immediately began proscribing their enemies after they came to an agreement amongst themselves, and many of those who were proscribed fled to Sextus in Sicily. While Octavian sent lieutenants to Sicily to try to subdue Sextus Pompeius (and he certainly remained a focus of opposition in the Western Mediterranean) the faction of Cassius and Brutus was the second triumvirate's first priority. Thus Sextus had the time and resources to develop an army, with the whole island of Sicily as his base, and (even more importantly) to establish a strong navy operated by Sicilian marines.

Brutus and Cassius lost the twin battles of Philippi and committed suicide in 42 BC. Many of the survivors fled to Sicily to join Sextus and continue the fight. After this, the triumvirs turned their attentions to Sicily and Sextus.

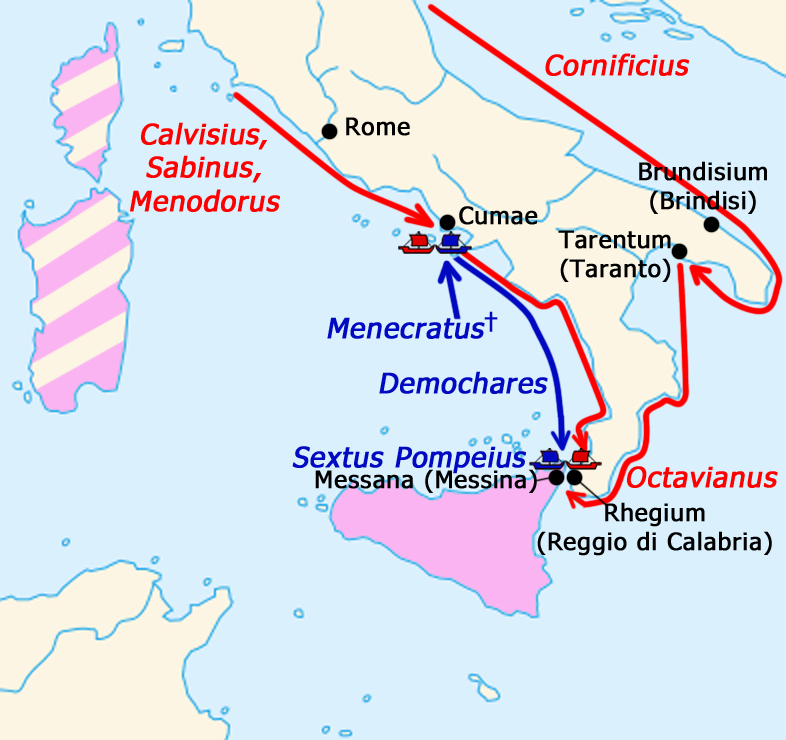
Bellum Siculum, campaign of 38/37 BC. Sextus Pompeius' possessions (territories that went over to Octavianus before the war with Menodorus are painted in pink and beige) ↗ – actions of Caesar Octavian and his admirals. ↗ – actions of Sextus Pompey and his admirals.

However, Sextus was by now prepared for strong resistance. He went about establishing a blockade around Italy, preventing any food from reaching the peninsula. At one point, Antony's mother, Julia, ended up in Sicily with Sextus. He sent her along to Antony in the East as a token of good faith, and the two agreed to help one another if war broke out between Antony and Octavian. In response, Octavian also took steps to try to secure Sextus' loyalty. In the following years, military confrontations failed to return a conclusive victory for either side, although in 40 BC Sextus' admiral, the freedman Menas, seized Sardinia from Octavian's governor Marcus Lurius. In 39 BC, Sextus and the triumvirs signed for peace in the Pact of Misenum. Pompey was given legitimate control over Sicily and Sardinia in exchange for keeping the grain supply to Rome open and keeping his pirates in check. The reason for the peace treaty was to secure the West before the anticipated campaign against the Parthian Empire: Tacitus reports the view that "he [Octavian] had cheated Sextus Pompeius by a spurious peace treaty". Antony, the leader of Rome's eastern provinces, needed a large number of legions for the coming campaign, which would take his army (ostensibly) through Mesopotamia, Armenia and Parthia. Thus, an armistice with Sextus' large forces on Sicily proved useful.

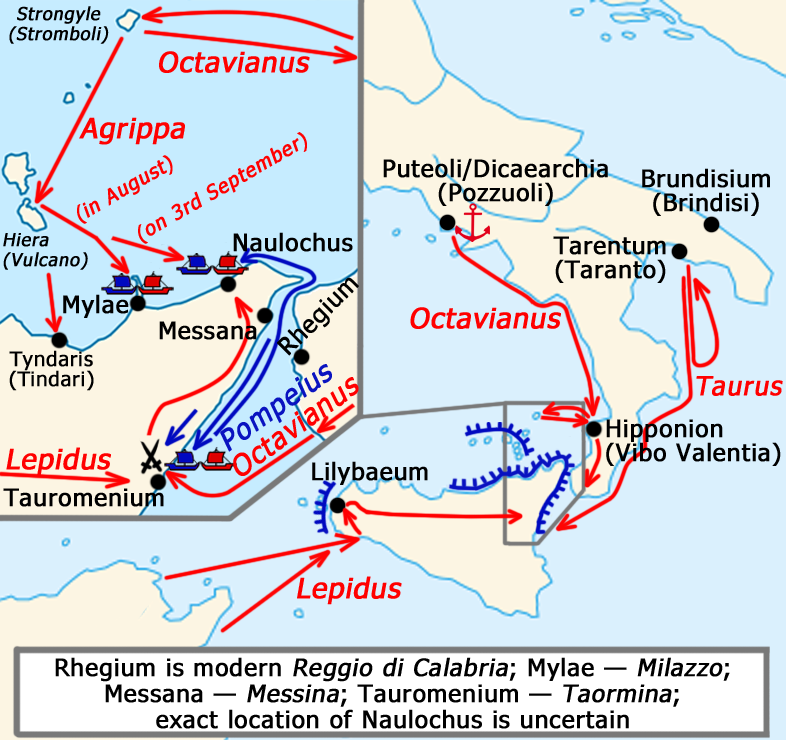
Sicilian revolt, campaign of 36 BC. ↗ – actions of Caesar Octavian and his commanders; ↗ – actions of Sextus Pompey and his commanders.

The peace did not last for long. In Antony's absence, Octavian renewed the conflict against Sextus. Sextus and Octavian accused each other of violating the terms of the Pact of Misenum, but the final straw was the betrayal of Sardinia to Octavian by Menas. Octavian was defeated in the naval battle of Messina (37 BC), so he now turned to his friends Marcus Vipsanius Agrippa and Titus Statilius Taurus, both very talented generals. In addition, the third triumvir, Marcus Aemilius Lepidus, raised 14 legions in his African provinces to help defeat Pompey.

Agrippa spent the winter training a navy on land and building a fleet near Lake Avernus, from scratch. Agrippa fought Sextus at Mylae in August 36 BC, and again a month later, while Lepidus and Statilius Taurus invaded Sicily. In the Battle of Naulochus, Agrippa destroyed the remainder of Sextus' fleet. Sextus escaped to Asia Minor and, by abandoning Sicily, lost his only base of support.

Sextus Pompeius was finally captured in 35 BC, and executed without trial in Miletus by Marcus Titius, whom Sextus had once spared; either by his own initiative or possibly on the orders of Antony or Plancus. Although Octavian later pretended that the execution without a trial of Sextus was illegal because Sextus was a Roman citizen, Octavian himself had declared Sextus an outlaw without citizen rights.

== Family connections ==
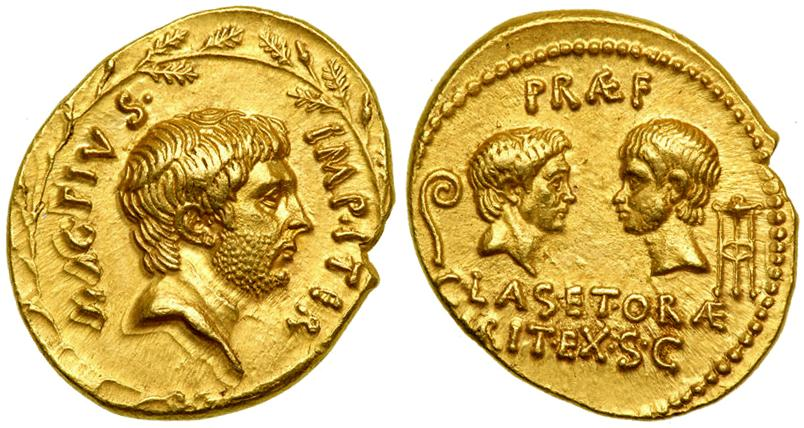
Sextus Pompey on an aureus dated 42–40 BC. The reverse reads praefectus classis.

Sextus had married Scribonia, a distant relative. She was the daughter of Lucius Scribonius Libo, consul of 34 BC and the niece of another Scribonia, the second wife of Octavian. Sextus and Scribonia had a daughter, their only child, called Pompeia Magna. As an affine to both Sextus and Octavian, Scribonius Libo had played a role in brokering peace between Sextus and the Triumviri. He very reluctantly abandoned Sextus in 36/35, in return for which he had received the consulship.

== Chronology ==
- 48 BC – in Egypt with his father, who is assassinated
- 47/45 BC – resistance in Africa
- 45 BC – his brother, Gnaeus, is defeated at Munda, Sextus continues resistance
- 42 BC – controls Sicily with a powerful navy
- 39 BC – pact of Misenum with Octavianus and Antony
- 37 BC – defeats Octavian off Messina
- 36 BC
  - August, defeats Octavian
  - September, defeated by Agrippa off Naulochus (Sicily)
- 35 BC – captured and executed in Asia Minor (Miletus)

== Historiographical readings ==
Where Plutarch gives Sextus only a minor role in the confused events surrounding the fall of the Roman Republic, Appian sees him as a more central figure, who might even have emerged as the final victor, so as to establish a dynasty of Pompeys, not Caesars.

== Dramatic representations ==
- William Shakespeare had Sextus Pompey as a major character in his play Antony and Cleopatra (1606–07).
  - British actor Donald Sumpter portrayed Sextus Pompey in the 1981 BBC Shakespeare television production of Antony and Cleopatra.
  - American actor Walter Koenig portrayed Sextus Pompey in the 1983 Bard Productions television production of the play.
- Sesto (Italian for Sextus) appears as main character in 1682 opera titled Il Pompeo by Italian baroque composer Alessandro Scarlatti.
- Sextus ("Sesto" in Italian) appears in George Frideric Handel's 1724 opera Giulio Cesare in Egitto ("Julius Caesar in Egypt"). The opera attributes to Sextus the killing of the Egyptian King Ptolemy XIII, who had killed his father Pompey. This is not historically attested.
- Sextus appears as a minor character in 2 episodes of the MGM+ series Domina, portrayed by Tom Forbes.
