= Masteabar =

- Agellid of western Numidia
- Fragment of a slab mentioning Masteabar, found in Syracuse

King of Numidia
- Reign: c. 88 – c. 81 BC
- Predecessor: Gauda
- Successor: Massinissa II
- Died: 81 BC (likely)
- Issue: Masinissa II
- Dynasty: Massylii
- Father: Gauda

Masteabar (perhaps Mastanabal II) was a petty king of western Numidia. He was a son of Gauda, ruler of all Numidia, and brother of Hiempsal II, ruler of eastern Numidia. His existence is known only from a single fragmentary inscription. It seems that Gauda, on his death in 88 BC, divided his kingdom between his sons, Hiempsal receiving the larger part and Masteabar the smaller.

== Reign ==
In 88 BC, upon the death of Gauda, Numidia was divided between his two sons, Hiempsal II and Masteabar. Hiempsal and his descendants ruled over Eastern Numidia, while Masteabar ruled over Western Numidia, a less significant kingdom that may have been a vassal to Hiempsal II and, subsequently, Juba I.

In 81 BC, a rebellious Roman general, Domitius, allied with a Numidian king named Hiarbas, who appears to have displaced the sons of Gauda. The allies were defeated by the Roman general Pompey, Hiempsal being restored to his throne and Masinissa being placed on the western throne. This latter was probably Masteabar's son, and the Roman action indicates that Rome recognised the legitimacy of Masteabar's kingdom.

Masteabar's grandson, Arabio, was the last independent Numidian king in 42 BC.

== Uncertainties regarding his reign ==
Few documents attest to the existence of Masteabar. His name appears only once, on a reused marble stele discovered in Syracuse: "ἐπειδὴ βασιλ]εὺς Μαστεαβαρ βασιλέως Γαύου..." ("Since King Masteabar, son of King Gauda...").

Furthermore, an epigraphic document from Rhodes, inscribed on marble, mentions two Numidian kings who were grandsons of Gauda. One interpretation suggests that these were the children of Masteabar, who may have held power before Hiempsal II. However, there is no evidence to confirm that he ruled over the same kingdom as his father and brother. According to Vassa N. Kontorinis, if he did indeed reign, his name should appear in the inscription Inscriptiones Latinae selectae 840. The text from Rhodes indicates that his reign was not in Eastern Numidia, but rather corresponds to that of Mastanabal I, king of Western Numidia.

However, according to a passage in De viris illustribus urbis Romae (77), the existence of Western Numidia is attested prior to 81 BC, the year in which it was restored to the two sons of Gauda: Hiempsal II and Masteabar. The text suggests that the kingdom was established following the death of Gauda in 88 BC. Furthermore, the rulers of Western Numidia belonged to a dynastic branch of the same Massylian royal family as those of Eastern Numidia.

According to Jehan Desanges, the identification of this figure with Mastenissa I lacks a solid basis. He favors the hypothesis that the kingdom was divided between Gauda’s two sons, positing that Masteabar reigned for a short period before being succeeded by Masinissa II. Michèle Coltelloni goes further, suggesting a kinship tie between Masteabar and Massinissa II. Werner Huß supports this hypothesis, noting that the existence of two separate kingdoms is well established and that Masteabar likely ruled over his own realm, which emerged from a dynastic partition though he stops short of confirming a direct familial link between Masteabar and Massinissa II.

== Etymology ==
Gabriel Camps hypothesizes that Masteabar is "an aberrant form of Mastanaba'," concluding that it likely refers to Mastanabal II, who bore the name of his ancestor, Mastanabal. The element Mastan (MSTN), meaning "protector" appears in several royal names. Virginie Bridoux argues that it is necessary to refer to the Greek inscription and to identify the ruler as King Masteabar, in order to avoid genealogical confusion.

== Sources ==
- Camps, Gabriel (1984). "Les derniers rois numides Massinissa II et Arabion". Bulletin archéologique du Comité des travaux historiques et scientifiques. 17b: 303–11.
- Roller, Duane W. (2003). The World of Juba II and Kleopatra Selene: Royal Scholarship on Rome's African Frontier. New York: Routledge.
