= Bocchus =

Bocchus is the name of 2 kings of Mauretania.

- Bocchus I
- Bocchus II
