= Arabio =

Last independent Numidian king (ruled 44-40 BC)

- Agellid
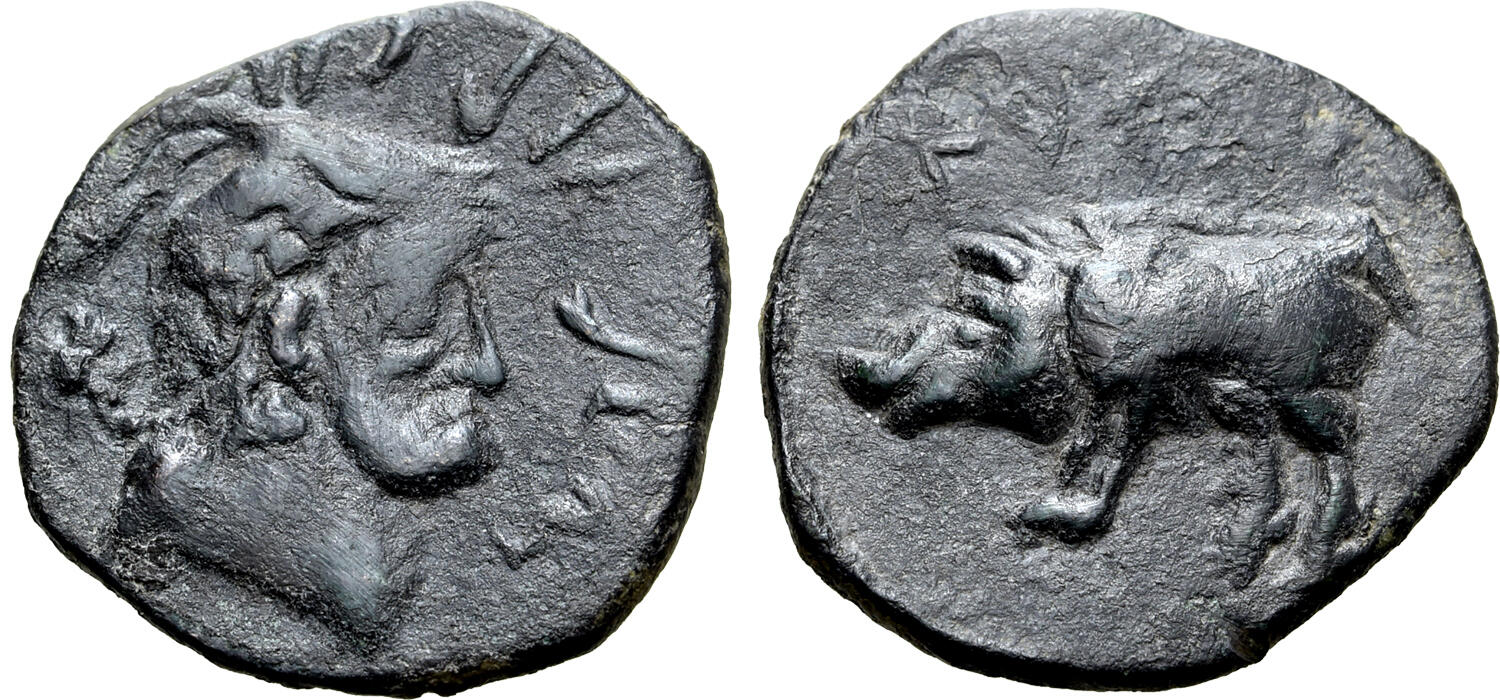
- Bronze coin minted in Macomades and possibly bearing Arabio's effigy

King of Numidia
- Reign: 44–40 BC
- Predecessor: Publius Sittius
- Successor: Juba II
- Born: Cirta
- Died: c. 40 BC; Africa (Roman province)
- Father: Massinissa II

Arabio (or Arabion) was the last independent Numidian king, ruling the western region between 44 and 40 BC. According to Appian, he was a son of Masinissa II and probable grandson of Gauda, who had divided Numidia between his sons in 88 BC. He was of Massylian origin.

== Etymology ==
The etymology of the name Arabio is unknown, but it is undoubtedly of Semitic origin. It might be the same as that of "Arab" or else derive from the Punic word rab, meaning "leader". The same word existed in biblical Hebrew (chief) and in Aramaic (governor, head of a professional class). The initial A- likely represents a berberisation of the Punic root. This root is the equivalent of the Numidian root mess, "leader", which is in turn the root of the name of Arabio's father, Masinissa. It was first proposed by the numismatist Jean Mazard in 1955 that Arabio's given name was the same as that of his father and that Roman authors referred to him merely by the Punic form with which they were more familiar. The Numidian and Punic languages belong to the Berber and Semitic branches of the Afro-Asiatic language family, respectively.

== Flight to Hispania ==
During the Roman civil war of 49–45 BC, Masinissa II and his cousin Juba I, ruler of the larger and more powerful kingdom of eastern Numidia, sided with the Roman general Gnaeus Pompeius against Julius Caesar. In 46 BC, Caesar and his allies defeated Masinissa and Juba, who committed suicide, at the Battle of Thapsus. Arabio managed to escape and join Pompeius' supporters in Hispania. The kingdom of his father was broken up and given to Caesar's allies: the western part to King Bocchus II of Mauretania and the eastern part, including Cirta, to Publius Sittius, a Roman mercenary captain, to be ruled as an autonomous principality. It is possible that Cirta had belonged not to his father's kingdom but to that of Juba.

== Rule in Numidia ==
In 44 BC, probably shortly before or after the assassination of Caesar, Arabio returned to Africa at the urging of Gnaeus Pompeius' son, Sextus Pompeius. From Africa, he sent men back to Hispania for military training. He reclaimed his father's kingdom with relative ease, forcing Bocchus into exile, and then contrived to assassinate Sittius through a stratagem. News of his conquests had reached Rome by 14 June 44, when Cicero mentions it in a letter to Atticus. His success is sometimes attributed to the Roman training of the forces he had brought with him back to Africa, but is more likely due to the allegiance of the population to one of their own.

Arabio managed to maintain himself in his kingdom for four years. Despite his affinity for the Pompeians, he supported the Second Triumvirate after its creation in November 43 BC. In the war that broke out in 42 BC between Quintus Cornificius, governor of Africa Vetus, and Titus Sextius, governor of Africa Nova (Juba's old kingdom), he took the side of Sextius to win the favour of the triumvirs, particularly Octavian. According to Dio Cassius, he initially took the side of Cornificius as a loyal Pompeian, but he was definitely on the side of Sextius when their allied armies forced Laelius to abandon the siege of Cirta. In the ensuing battle near Utica, Cornificius was killed and Laelius committed suicide. This allowed Sextius to take control over both provinces of Africa.

The extent of Arabio's rule is not precisely known. It probably corresponded to his father's kingdom, which lay between the rivers Sava and Ampsaga. The presence of some "Sittians" (Latin sittiani), former followers of Sittius, among the allied forces of Arabio and Cornificius suggests that they perhaps remained in control of the late mercenary's principality, including Cirta.

Jean Mazard proposed in 1955 that two series of very rare coins belonged to Masinissa II and Arabio, but Gabriel Camps has argued that they more properly belong to the Mauretanian king Mastanesosus.

== Final war and death ==
In 40 BC, during the Perusine War, Sextius refused to cede the province of Africa Vetus to Caius Fuficius Fango, who had been granted both provinces by the triumvirs. Arabio either actively supported his old ally or else refused to intervene to help Fango. In any case, he was treated as an enemy by the latter. After arriving in Africa Nova, he invaded Arabio's kingdom and forced him to flee. With the cavalry that had fled with him, Arabio reinforced Sextius in Africa Vetus. Now strengthened, Sextius expelled Fango and reasserted his authority over both provinces.

Shortly after his victory, Sextius began to suspect Arabio's loyalty and had him killed. After Arabio's death, western Numidia and Cirta were finally incorporated into the Roman republic, presumably into the province of Africa Nova.

It is probable that the dispute between the Arabio and Sextius centred around the former land of Sittius or at least that part of it which had belonged to Masinissa. The death of Arabio was convenient for the Sittians, since the land of Sittius was converted by Rome into the Respublica IIII Coloniarum Cirtensium, a special legionary autonomy within Africa Nova.

== Sources ==
- Camps, Gabriel (1984). "Les derniers rois numides Massinissa II et Arabion". Bulletin archéologique du Comité des travaux historiques et scientifiques. 17b: 303–11.
- Camps, Gabriel (1989) [published online 2012]. "Arabion". Encyclopédie berbère. Vol. 6 | Antilopes – Arzuges. Aix-en-Provence: Edisud. pp. 831–34.
- Law, R. C. C. (2002). "North Africa in the Hellenistic and Roman Periods, 323 BC to AD 305". In J. D. Fage (ed.). The Cambridge History of Africa, Volume 2: From c. 500 BC to AD 1050. Cambridge: Cambridge University Press. pp. 148–208.
- Roller, Duane W. (2003). The World of Juba II and Kleopatra Selene: Royal Scholarship on Rome's African Frontier. New York: Routledge. ISBN 978-1-134-40296-0.
