= Aspar (Numidian) =

Ancient Roman spy

Aspar was a Numidian man who lived in the 2nd and 1st centuries BCE. He was sent by the Numidian king Jugurtha to the Mauretanian king Bocchus I in order to learn his plans, after it had become known that Bacchus had invited the Roman general Sulla to a conference. Aspar was, however, deceived, as Bocchus and Sulla both conspired to hold a series of sham meetings to feed false information to Aspar, who was told several misleading things about the true discussions with Sulla, while the pair met in secret at night.
