= Masinissa II =

Petty king of western Numidia

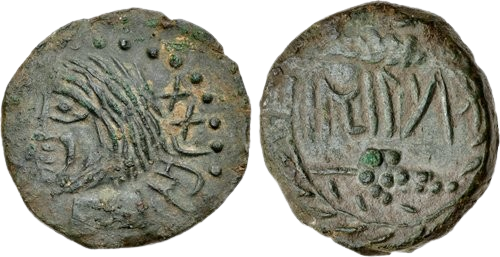
- Bronze coin attributed to his reign.

King of Numidia
- Reign: 81–46 BC
- Predecessor: Masteabar
- Successor: Publius Sittius
- Died: after 46 BC
- Issue: Arabio
- Father: Masteabar

Masinissa II (sometimes Massinissa or Mastenissa) was the petty king of western Numidia with his capital at Cirta (81–46 BC). He was named after, or took his name after, his famous ancestor Masinissa I, the unifier and founder of the kingdom of Numidia.

Masinissa was probably the son of Masteabar, an obscure king who is known from a single fragmentary inscription. Masteabar was a son of King Gauda (died 88 BC), who divided the kingdom of Numidia between his sons, Masteabar and his brother Hiempsal II. Masinissa's ally and contemporary, Juba I of eastern Numidia, was most likely his first cousin. The western Numidian kingdom was smaller and weaker than the eastern.

In 81 BC, the Roman general Pompey invaded Numidia, which, under the rule of a certain Hiarbas, was assisting the Roman rebel Domitius. Pompey subdued Numidia in a forty-day campaign and restored Hiempsal II to his throne and established Masinissa on his. This constituted formal Roman recognition of the two Numidian kingdoms.

During the Roman civil war of 49–45 BC, Masinissa and Juba both allied with Pompey, whose supporters controlled the province of Africa, against Caesar. In 46 BC, Caesar invaded Africa and his allies, Bocchus II of Mauretania and the mercenary warlord Publius Sittius, invaded Masinissa's kingdom from the west, capturing Cirta. The west of his kingdom was given to Bocchus, while the east with Cirta was granted to Sittius to rule. Juba committed suicide after the defeat, but Masinissa's fate is unknown. His son, Arabio, escaped to join Pompey's forces in Hispania and later returned to recover part of his father's kingdom.

== Sources ==
- Camps, Gabriel (1984). "Les derniers rois numides Massinissa II et Arabion". Bulletin archéologique du Comité des travaux historiques et scientifiques. 17b: 303–11.
- Law, R. C. C. (2002). "North Africa in the Hellenistic and Roman Periods, 323 BC to AD 305". In J. D. Fage (ed.). The Cambridge History of Africa, Volume 2: From c. 500 BC to AD 1050. Cambridge: Cambridge University Press. pp. 148–208.
- Roller, Duane W. (2003). The World of Juba II and Kleopatra Selene: Royal Scholarship on Rome's African Frontier. New York: Routledge.
