= Second Battle of Cirta =

Battle of the Jugurthine War

- Part of Jugurthine War
| Date | 106 BC |
| Location | near Cirta, Numidia |
| Result | Roman victory |

Belligerents
| Kingdom of Numidia; Kingdom of Mauretania | Roman Republic |

Commanders and leaders
| King Jugurtha; King Bocchus | Gaius Marius; Lucius Cornelius Sulla |

Strength
| 90,000 Numidians, Gaetulians and Mauretanians (mostly light infantry and cavalry) | 30,000–40,000 men |

Casualties and losses
| Unknown | Unknown |

The Second Battle of Cirta, part of the Jugurthine War, was fought in 106 BC between a Numidian-Mauretanian coalition and a Roman army near the Numidian capital of Cirta. The Numidians were led by King Jugurtha, the Mauritanians were led by king Bocchus while the Romans were under the overall command of Gaius Marius who was supported by his quaestor Lucius Cornelius Sulla as cavalry commander. The Romans were victorious, routing their opponents and capturing Cirta.

== Background ==
The war against Jugurtha had been going on since 112 BC. Several Roman commanders had tried to defeat the king and failed. In 107 BC, the new commander of the Roman forces in Africa, Gaius Marius captured the Numidian capital of Cirta, he then surprised Jugurtha by capturing the treasury fortresses at Thala. The following year Marius marched west, again plundering the Numidian countryside. Marius's march west provoked the Mauretanian king, Jugurtha's father-in-law Bocchus, into joining forces with Jugurtha. At the end of the campaign, near a river called the Muluccha, Marius captured another of Jugurtha's treasury fortresses. After taking the fortress at the Muluccha, Marius decided to return to Cirta to put his soldiers into winter quarters.

== Prelude ==
While marching back east the Romans were ambushed, just to the west of Setif, by the combined forces of Jugurtha and Bocchus. Marius barely managed to keep his army from being destroyed; all he could do was form defensive circles and then led his personal cavalry squadron to help each section that came under the most pressure. The Numidian and Mauretanian cavalries kept on attacking and for a time Marius' main force found itself pinned down on a small hill, while Sulla and his men were on the defensive on another hill nearby.

The attackers, thinking they had the Romans well in hand, considered the matter completed for the day and retired to their camp. That night they celebrated their victory prematurely. At dawn, the Romans launched a fierce attack on the Africans' camp, taking them by surprise. The Numidians and Mauretanians were routed and Marius resumed his march on Cirta.

When the Romans resumed the march to Cirta, they formed their army into a square to protect against further ambushes. Marius put his officers throughout the marching square to ensure discipline and orders were quickly relayed to his soldiers. Sulla, was given command of the entire right wing of the army.

== Battle ==
As the Romans neared Cirta, Marius' scouts reported Jugurtha's army advancing on them in four divisions. Since Marius was unsure about Jugurtha's tactics he decided to halt his army and let the enemy come to him. Jugurtha ordered his men to attack the Romans and the battle began. Sulla's wing came under attack first, his men withstanding the assault. At this point in the battle, the Mauritanian king Bocchus and his son Vollux appeared and attacked the Roman rear. Soon the Romans were under assault from every direction. The Romans were severely outnumbered, according to ancient sources the North Africans had marshalled 90,000 soldiers, almost giving them a three to one advantage.

Jugurtha tried to dispirit the Romans, and called out to them that he had just killed Gaius Marius, and exposed his sword dripping with blood. For a short while the trick worked and the Romans were thrown into confusion, but Sulla, who had counter-attacked and driven off the enemy in his section of the battlefield, threw his forces against Bocchus. The Mauritanians broke under Sulla's assault and Bocchus fled the battlefield. Meanwhile, Marius had restored order to his troops and went on the offensive himself; he put a Jugurthine cavalry detachment to flight and moved on to the next weak spot in his line. Marius and Sulla focused their efforts on the weakest part of their lines and slowly the tide of battle turned. The Romans gained the advantage and killed or routed the bulk of Jugurtha's army. The Numidian king and his remaining troops were surrounded and all were killed except Jugurtha who somehow was able to escape. The Romans had won the battle and slaughtered their enemy.

== Aftermath ==
The Romans resumed their march on Cirta and Marius put his men into winter quarters.

Jugurtha continued his war against Rome, reverting to guerilla warfare. Unfortunately for Jugurtha, Marius and Sulla were able to convince king Bocchus it was in his best interest to abandon his son-in-law. Bocchus conspired with Sulla, who had traveled to Mauretania on a special mission to capture Jugurtha. It was a dangerous operation from the beginning, with King Bocchus weighing up the advantages of handing Jugurtha over to Sulla or Sulla over to Jugurtha. In the end, Bocchus decided his future lay with Rome and he helped capture Jugurtha. Although Sulla had engineered the capture of Jugurtha, as Sulla was serving under Marius at the time, Marius took credit for this feat. The publicity attracted by this feat boosted Sulla's political career.
