= Baga (king) =

Amazigh king of Mauretania, c. 225 BC

- King of Mauretania

King of Mauretania
- Reign: around 225 BC
- Predecessor: Unknown (Note: The only previously known ruler would be the legendary king Atlas around the 6th century BC.)
- Successor: Uncertain (Note: Historians tend to consider Bocchus I as his indirect successor but the lack of information regarding this succession makes it a subject of debate.)
- Died: 3rd century BC.
- Issue: Uncertain
- Numidian: BGY

Baga (also Bagas) was an Amazigh king of Mauretania (northern region of present-day Morocco) in approximately 225 BC. Although difficult to establish as fact, it is quite likely that Baga was a member of an older dynasty.

King Baga appeared in the historical record during the events of the Second Punic War. Upon Masinissa's return to Africa (present-day Tunisia), he had to either pass through rivaling Massaesylian territory or through Mauretanian territory. Choosing the latter, he was provided with 4,000 Mauri cavalry units by King Baga of Mauretania that stayed with Masinissa until he reached the borders of his own kingdom. Baga also provided military support during the final chapter of the Second Punic War in the fight against Hannibal.

According to Gabriel Camps, this signifies that Baga was no petty king, and that he had strong control over vast resources and territories, from the Atlantic Ocean to the Mulucha (likely the Moulouya River in Morocco), and from the Mediterranean Sea to the southern Atlas Mountains.

His kingdom was inherited by Bocchus I, who was likely his son or grandson.
