= Hiempsal =

Hiempsal, was the name of the two kings of Numidia

- Hiempsal I, the son of Micipsa, was assassinated by Jugurtha.
- Hiempsal II, the son of Gauda, the half-brother of Jugurtha.
