= Eunoë (wife of Bogudes) =

- Queen of Mauretania
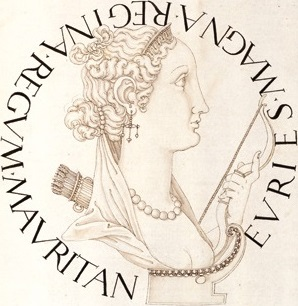
- Eunoë from Magnum ac Novum Opus
- Spouse: Bogudes

Eunoë Maura was the wife of Bogudes, King of Western Mauretania. Her name has also been spelled Euries or Euryes or Eunoa.

== Biography ==
=== Early life ===
Eunoë Maura was thought to be descended from Berbers, but her name is Greek so it appears she might have been from there or had Greek ancestry. She was likely of very high status, as she is mentioned by historian Suetonius in the same context as Cleopatra.

=== Marriage ===
At an unspecified early date in her marriage to her husband Bogud he mounted an expedition along the Atlantic coast, seemingly venturing into the tropics. When he returned he presented his wife Eunoë with gigantic reeds and asparagus he had found on the journey.

She is believed to have been a mistress of Julius Caesar. She may have replaced Cleopatra in Caesar's affections, when he arrived in North Africa prior to the Battle of Thapsus on 6 April 46 BC, the two were among several queens courted by Caesar. It is also possible that they first met in Spain if she accompanied her husband there on a campaign. Only a brief romance for the Roman, both Eunoe and Bogudes profited through gifts bestowed on them by Caesar. Caesar departed from Africa in June 46 BC, five and a half months after he landed.

== Cultural depictions ==
Eunoë and Caesar's affair is greatly exaggerated and expanded on in the Medieval French prose work Faits des Romains. Jeanette Beer in her book A Medieval Caesar states that the Roman general is "transformed into Caesar, the medieval chevalier" in the text, and that the author is more interested in Caesar's sexual dominance over the queen than the political dominance he held over her husband Bogud. The text describes her; "Eunoe was the most beautiful woman in four kingdoms — nevertheless, she was Moorish", which Beer further analysed as being indicative of the fact that it was unimaginable to audiences of the time to believe that a lover of Caesar could be ugly, but that Moors still represented everything that was ugly to them.

Eunoë has also been depicted in several novels about Caesar, as well as serialized stories in The Cornhill Magazine. In such fiction her character often serves as a foil for the relationship between Caesar and another woman, mostly Cleopatra, such as in The Memoirs of Cleopatra, The Bloodied Toga and When We Were Gods. In Song of the Nile she also plays a posthumous role as a person of interest for Cleopatra's daughter Selene II who became queen of Mauritania after her.

Eunoe has also been depicted in a numismatic drawing by Italian artist and polymath Jacopo Strada, who lived in the 16th century. There is however no archaeological evidence of a coin that bears her name or picture.

== See also ==
- Women in ancient Rome
