= Bocchus I =

- King of Mauretania
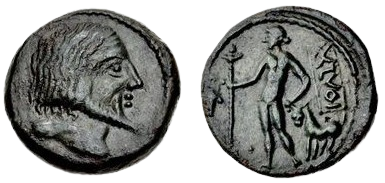
- Coin attributed to Bocchus's reign

King of Mauretania
- Reign: c. 110 – c. 80s BC
- Predecessor: Uncertain (Note: While it is known that the kingdom did exist before him, the name of his direct predecessor is uncertain. It might have been Baga who’s believed to be either his father or grandfather but this is unveriable and a mere hypothesis.)
- Successor: Mastanesosus
- Rival kings: Ascalis (c. 80 BC); Magadulsa (c. 91 BC)
- Born: Mauretania
- Died: 80s BC; Kingdom of Mauretania
- Issue: Mastanesosus; Bogud; Volux; A daughter married to Jugurtha
- Military career
- Conflicts: Jugurthine War; Second Battle of Cirta

Bocchus, often referred to as Bocchus I for clarity, was king of Mauretania from c. 111 – 80 BCE. He was father-in-law to the Numidian king Jugurtha, with whom he initially allied against the Romans in the Jugurthine War, a lengthy and indecisive conflict.

King Bocchus eventually betrayed Jugurtha to the Romans in 105 BCE. Jugurtha was captured and imprisoned in Rome, while the Romans and Bocchus divided Jugurtha's Numidian kingdom between them.

== Etymology of his name ==
A. Pellegrin suggests that the name Bocchus is only the Latin form of a Berber name, possibly Wekkus. This name may be related to the Touareg "Aweqqas", which means "lion", or, in Kabyle, "shark", and can be used as a male name. Several locations in North Africa bear etymologically related names, such as the city of Aokas in Algeria, and Djebel Ouekkas in Tunisia.

== Life and family ==
Very little is known about Bocchus I or his Mauretanian kingdom. He was probably the son or grandson of King Baga of Mauretania, a contemporary of King Massinissa of neighboring Numidia.

Bocchus's North African kingdom was bordered by the Atlantic Ocean and the Moulouya River (Latin: Mulucha). Roman historian Sallust in Bellum Jugurthinum (The Jurguthine War) notes:

All the Moors were ruled by King Bocchus, who knew nothing of the Roman people save their name and was in turn unknown to us before that time either in peace or in war.

— C. Sallustius Crispus, Chapter 19, Bellum Iugurthinum

According to Sallust, by custom Bocchus had many wives and four known children: his daughter (name unknown), who married Jugurtha of Numidia; his eventual heir Sosus/Mastanesosus; and two other sons, Bogud (not to be confused with king Bogud) and Volux.

== Jugurthine War ==
Around 108 BCE, as the conflict between Rome and Numidia coalesced, Bocchus remained noncommittal. After Jugurtha promised Bocchus a third of his kingdom, Bocchus allied with Jugurtha. Their allied forces were defeated by Gaius Marius at the Second Battle of Cirta in 106 BCE.

As Jugurtha continued to evade the Romans and the war dragged on, Bocchus began reconsidering the alliance and sought a consultation with an ambitious quaestor named Sulla. Mauretanian ambassadors were dispatched to Rome. The Senate was cautiously encouraging but requested a demonstration of commitment to the alliance. Bocchus again consulted Sulla and requested a meeting with Jugurtha, who walked into their trap. Bocchus turned Jugurtha over to Sulla.

By treaty, Bocchus and the Romans divided the kingdom of Numidia between them. Marius was given a triumph for victory over Numidia, but Sulla always wore a gold ring that King Bocchus had made for him, which depicted Bocchus handing Jugurtha over to Sulla.

Bocchus was a reliable supplier of exotic African animals to Rome, including panthers and lions for Roman spectacles.

== Successors ==
Bocchus was succeeded by his son Mastanesosus, who bequeathed the kingdom to his sons Bocchus II and Bogud, who each ruled half the kingdom of Mauretania. The two kings took opposite sides in Rome's civil war, and Bocchus II seized Bogud's half. When Bocchus II died in 33 BCE, Mauretania became a client kingdom of Rome.

== See also ==
- Jugurtha
- Jugurthine War
