= Mauretania =

Ancient kingdom in North Africa

Kingdom of Mauretania
- 3rd century BC – 7th century AD
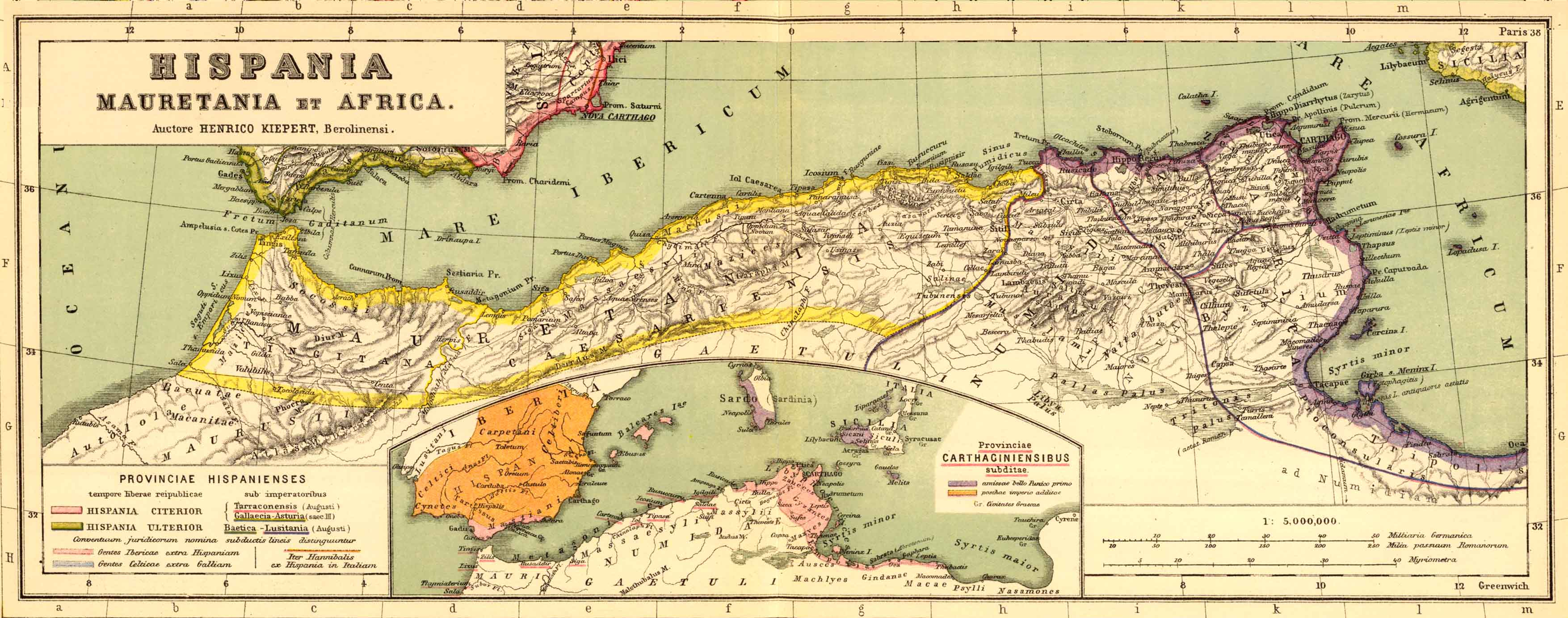
- Mauretania
- Status: Mauri kingdom (3rd century BC – 40 AD); Provinces of the Roman Empire (44 AD – 7th century AD); Independent kingdoms (431 AD – 8th century AD)
- Capital: Volubilis; Iol / Caesarea
- Common languages: Berbers, Latin and Punic
- Religion: Roman religion, Traditional Berber religion, Judaism, Christianity
- Government: Monarchy
- King
  - 600 BC: Atlas (Mythological Founder)
  - 225-??? BC: Baga
  - 110-80 BC: Bocchus I
  - 80-49 BC: Mastanesosus
  - 49-38 BC: Bogud
  - 49-33 BC: Bocchus II
  - 25 BC- 23 AD: Juba II
  - 21-40 AD: Ptolemy of Mauretania
  - 40-42 AD: Aedemon
  - 42-44 AD: Sabalus
  - 69 AD: Lucceius Albinus
- Historical era: Classical antiquity
  - Established: 3rd century BC
  - client state of the Roman Empire: 25 BC
  - Division into Roman provinces: 42 AD
  - Disestablished: 44 AD
- Today part of: Morocco; Algeria; Spain (Ceuta and Melilla)

Mauretania (/ˌmɒrɪˈteɪniə, ˌmɔːrɪ-/; Classical Latin: [mau̯reːˈtaːni.a]) is the Latin name for a region in the ancient Mediterranean Maghreb. Originally established in the northwest of Morocco, it encompassed at its height northern-central Morocco and western-central Algeria. Its Indigenous inhabitants (of Imazighen and Phoenician ancestry) were known to the peninsular Romans as the Mauri, and the Masaesyli. The population was also called Libyan or Libu, a label used to indicate all the populations of Berber origin who lived west of Egypt.

In 25 BC, Mauretania became a Roman client kingdom. Around 44 AD, the region was annexed to Rome and divided into two provinces: Mauretania Tingitana (named for Tangier) and Mauretania Caesariensis (named for Caesariana). From the 3rd century onward, Christianity spread. After Muslim Arabs subdued the region in the 7th century, Islam became the Maghreb’s dominant religion.

== Etymology ==
The Phoenicians originally referred to the region as Mauharim/Mahurin, meaning "Western Land," Its modern name, Mauretania, is a Latinized adaptation combining Mauri with the territorial suffix -tania. Together, the name translates to "Land of the Moors."

== Mythology ==
=== The Titan Atlas ===
In the earliest Greek mythology, the westernmost region of North Africa (corresponding to present-day Morocco) was considered the dwelling place of the Titan Atlas. Initially, his Kingdom was called Hesperitis, named after his second wife, Hesperis also called Hesperide (the daughter of his half-brother Hesperus, the personification of the West).

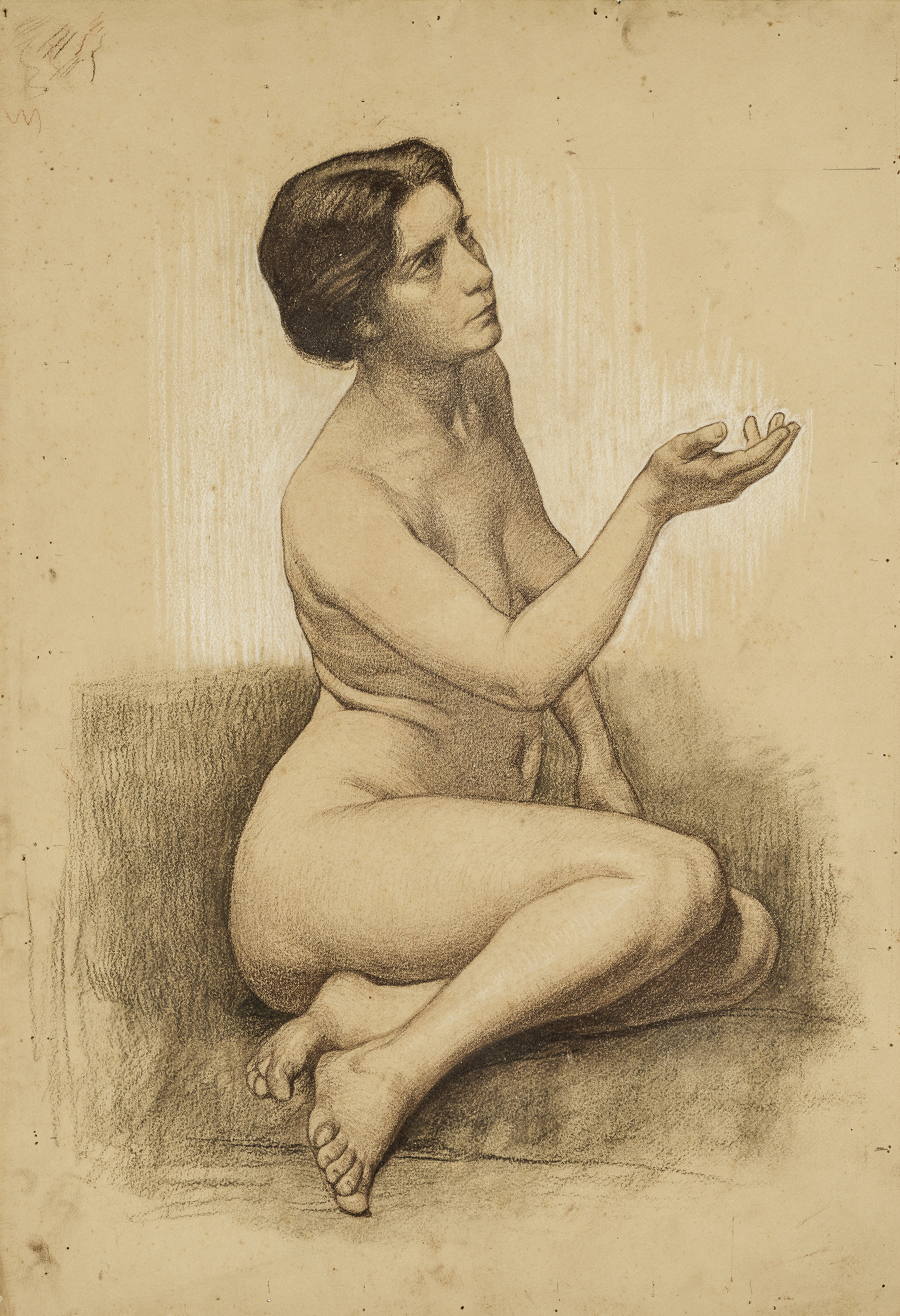
Depiction of Queen Hesperis/Hesperide by the painter Lipinsky Sigmund

Later, in both Greek and Roman traditions, this territory came to be known as Mauretania, and Atlas was celebrated as the founder of the kingdom and its royal lineage, earning him the title of "First king of Mauretania."

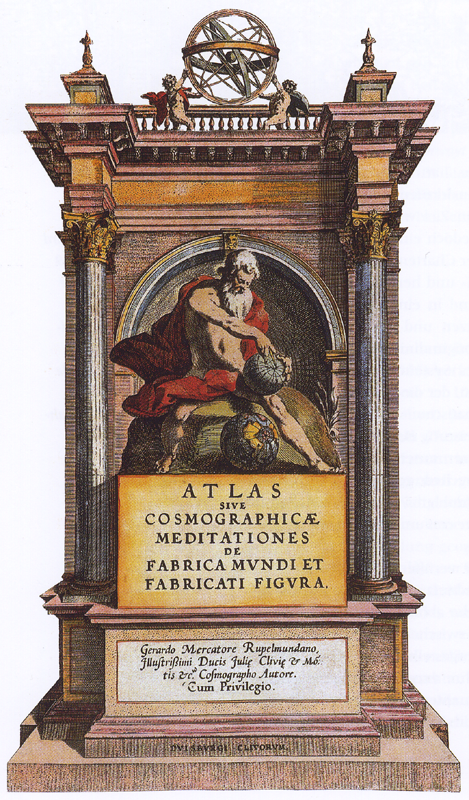
The famous depiction of the King Titan Atlas with the terrestrial globe and the celestial globe, created by the geographer Gerardus Mercator.

Atlas was described as a wise and exceptionally strong ruler, as well as an expert in geography; he was even credited with the invention of the celestial globe and took a keen interest in pastoral life. His legend took a dramatic turn when Perseus, returning from slaying Medusa, encountered Atlas tending his flocks and requested hospitality within his kingdom. Upon being refused, Perseus used the gaze of Medusa’s severed head to turn Atlas to stone, thereby transforming him into the modern-day Atlas mountain range.

=== The Hesperides ===
The Hesperides were the nymphs of the West and the sunset. Traditionally considered the daughters of Atlas and Hesperis, there are, however, various versions attributing them to different parents.

These nymphs were tasked with guarding a tree bearing prodigious fruit, the famous golden apples, capable of granting immortality to whoever ate them. The tree, a wedding gift from the goddess Hera, stood within a legendary garden known as the Garden of the Hesperides. Protecting the precious treasure was Ladon, a gigantic, serpentine dragon with a hundred heads. This mythical garden was located in the far west of North Africa, traditionally identified with the city of Lixus.

A painting by John Singer Sargent depicting the King Titan Altas raising the heavens, and beside him his daughters, the Hesperides.

=== The Giant Antaeus ===
The giant Antaeus and his wife, the minor goddess Tinjis, were mythological figures that originated in the Berber tradition and were later adopted by the Greeks. Antaeus appears in a variant of the famous eleventh labor of Heracles.

In the original version of this labor, the protagonist was Atlas, whom Heracles visited to obtain the renowned golden apples. However, in a separate mythological tradition centered on the ancestor of Heracles, Perseus, Atlas is transformed into a mountain; consequently, a second variant was created in which Antaeus replaces Atlas, serving as the primary challenge for the hero.

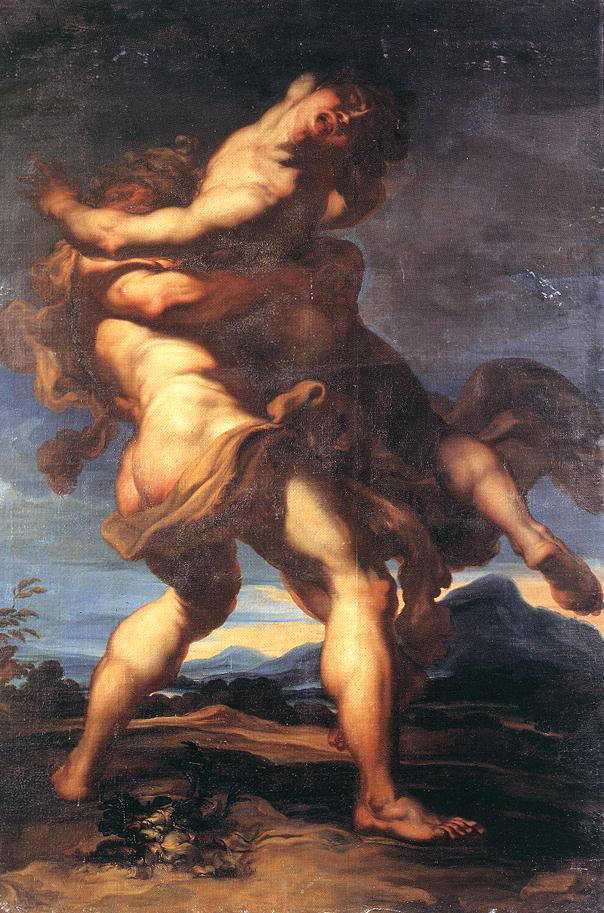
The painting by Gregorio De Ferrari depicting the struggle between Antaeus, king of ancient Libya, and Heracles.

Antaeus was the son of the god Poseidon and Gaia, the personification of the Earth. He reigned over all of ancient Libya, a territory roughly corresponding to the modern-day Maghreb region (excluding present-day Mauritania). He possessed extraordinary strength and was entirely invincible as long as he remained in contact with the ground. While Greek sources originally placed Antaeus further east, in what is now Libya, the Romans later relocated the legend to present-day Morocco, specifically to Lixus. This is the same site associated with the Hesperides, and it was here that the legendary, decisive clash between Heracles and the giant took place.

=== The origin of the Mauri and Numidians ===
According to the historian Sallust, who drew upon translations of ancient Carthaginian texts, the Mauri and Numidian peoples were, in part, descended from groups of Iranian origin. He recounted that, following the death of Heracles in Iberian Peninsula, his heterogeneous army was left without a single leader and eventually dispersed. Among these soldiers, contingents of Persians and Medes crossed the Pillars of Hercules (the Strait of Gibraltar) by sea and landed on the coast of North Africa.

Upon their arrival, the Medes joined the Libu populations inhabiting the Mediterranean coast near Spain, in the region of present-day Morocco. Over time, the indigenous language altered the name "Medes," giving rise to the term "Mauri". The Persians, meanwhile, settled further to the east; they frequently roamed the interior of what is now Algeria to explore the land and, having intermingled with the Gaetuli, came to be called "Nomads", a term that was subsequently corrupted into the name "Numidians."

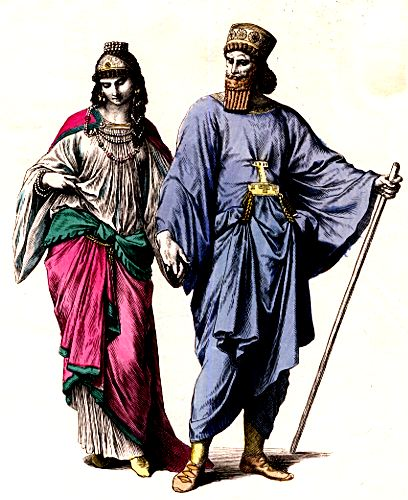
The image represents the ancient ethnic group of the Medes.

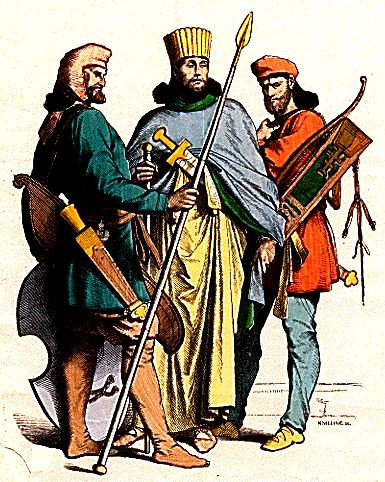
The image represents the ancient ethnic group of the Persians.

== History ==
=== First known King ===
Bagas was the first historically documented king of Mauretania. His reign liberated the region from the centuries-old Carthaginian sphere of influence around 225 BC. The kingdom of Baga extended from the Atlantic coast of northern Morocco to the Moulouya River and had as its capital the city of Voluibilis. During the Second Punic War between Carthage and Rome, unlike the neighboring kingdoms of Masaesyli and Massylii, Mauretania maintained formal neutrality. However, in 206 BC, when the Massylian prince Massinissa was defeated by his rivals and sought refuge in Mauretania, Bagas chose to offer him protection. The king provided him with an escort of 4,000 Moorish cavalry to escort him and open a passage for him through the hostile territories controlled by the king Syphax. Upon reaching the borders of the Massylii kingdom, the escort troop immediately returned to Mauretania without taking part in the subsequent clashes. After Baga there is a historical gap in the history of Mauretania and its kings up to Bocchus I.

The image depicts the territorial borders of Mauretania in yellow, Numidia in green and Carthage in purple, after the end of the Second Punic War.

=== Jugurthine War ===
Bocchus I reigned over Mauretania from 110 to 80 BC, though his reign likely began even earlier. Jugurtha, a Numidian ruler who lacked the support of other members of the Numidian dynasty, consistently sought an alliance with Mauretania going so far as to marry the daughter of Bocchus.

At the outbreak of the Jugurthine War in 111 BC, Jugurtha attempted to persuade his father-in-law to join the conflict, but Bocchus was reluctant to involve himself in a war that did not serve Mauretanian interests. However, in 107 BC, following heavy defeats inflicted upon the Numidians by the Romans, Jugurtha shifted his strategy: he convinced his father-in-law that Rome intended to conquer all of North Africa, thereby posing a direct threat to Mauretania as well. Bocchus subsequently decided to declare war on Rome and dispatched the Mauretanian army led by his son, Volux to assist the Numidians. This intervention brought the conflict to a military stalemate.

After years of attrition, the Roman consul Gaius Marius sought to bring Mauretania over to the Roman side. To this end, he tasked his quaestor and general, Lucius Cornelius Sulla, with initiating negotiations. Following a preliminary meeting, Volux escorted Sulla to Volubilis for formal talks. Upon arrival, however, Sulla did not negotiate directly with King Bocchus; instead, he dealt with Dabar, a nobleman and descendant of Masinissa who served at the Mauretanian court. Bocchus was, in fact, being closely watched by Aspar, an envoy sent by Jugurtha to ensure that he did not betray the Numidian alliance. During the talks, Sulla made significant promises, assuring that Rome would never pose a threat to Mauretania and that there would be no repercussions regarding the ongoing conflict; he further pledged to grant the land of the masaesyli, that is, about almost a third of Numidian territory to Mauretania. Sulla also emphasized that Jugurtha was, in fact, the true danger to Mauretania, noting that Jugurtha had ruthlessly eliminated members of the Numidian dynasty who opposed his efforts to reunify the kingdom and warned that he would almost certainly exploit the son he had fathered with a Mauretanian princess to stake a claim to Bocchus’s own throne. After assessing the situation, the mediator Dabar convinced Bocchus that betraying Jugurtha was the most advantageous course of action for Mauretania. The king agreed to the plan, feigned a desire to sign a peace treaty, and invited Jugurtha to Mauretania. Being inherently distrustful, Jugurtha arrived accompanied by his own army; a clash ensued, in which the Mauretanian forces emerged victorious. Jugurtha was ultimately captured and handed over to the Romans, bringing the war to an end.

The image represents Jugurtha captured by Bocchus I who delivers him to General Sulla.

=== Sulla's civil war ===
Following the end of the Jugurthine War, a fierce rivalry emerged between the general Sulla and the consul Gaius Marius, as both vied for credit for the victory. To provoke his rival, Sulla had a personal signet ring minted, depicting King Bocchus I in the act of handing over Jugurtha to him. The situation escalated dramatically in 91 BC, when Bocchus himself requested and received permission from the Senate to erect an imposing gilded monument on the Capitoline Hill, Rome’s most significant hill. The monument celebrated Sulla and Bocchus I as the primary architects of the capture of the Numidian king, Jugurtha. By excluding Marius, the monument brought the opposing factions to the brink of armed conflict in the streets of Rome; however, the sudden outbreak of the Social War intervened, forcing the Romans to temporarily set aside their internal strife to defend the Republic.

Part of the triumphal monument erected by Bocchus I in Rome.

Years later, following the most intense phase of the civil war and Sulla’s definitive victory in Italy between 83 and 82 BC, the remnants of the Marian faction (the supporters of Marius) found refuge and established control in the province of Africa. They forged an alliance with the Numidian king Hiarbas, who had usurped the throne by ousting the legitimate ruler, Hiempsal II. In 81 BC, Sulla dispatched his general, Gnaeus Pompey, to Africa to confront the Marian forces. After defeating the Marians, Sulla’s forces began to advance from the east to attack Hiarbas’s territories, while also calling upon Mauretania to launch an assault from the west. King Bocchus I agreed to help and sent his son Bogud (not to be confused with the Bogud who was the grandson of Bocchus I) with a Moorish army to invade from the west. Attacked on multiple fronts, Hiarbas was defeated, and Sulla restored Hiempsal II to the throne.

=== Separatist Revolt and Sertorian War ===
Following the death of King Bocchus I, which occurred around 81/80 BC, his son Mastanesosus ascended the throne of Mauretania. His succession, however, was contested by Iephtas, a local nobleman who seized control of the region of Tingis and proclaimed it the Principality of Tingis. Iephtas died that same year, and his son, Ascalis, succeeded him to power. Rome intervened, with the two opposing factions backing different rulers: the Sullan faction chose to support Ascalis, while the Marian forces aligned themselves with the legitimate ruler, Mastanesosus. To consolidate this alliance and maintain strategic control over the Strait of Gibraltar, Sulla dispatched one of his generals, Lucius Paccianus, to Mauretania at the head of a strong military contingent to protect the usurper. Meanwhile, the Marian general Quintus Sertorius cornered on the Iberian Peninsula and forced to flee landed on the coast of Mauretania and struck a mutually beneficial agreement with King Mastanesosus. The pact stipulated that Sertorius would provide military support to crush the rebellion and restore the authority of the legitimate king, receiving in return funds, resources, and indigenous troops for his own operations. After swiftly defeating Ascalis and annihilating the army of Lucius Paccianus, who perished in the conflict, Sertorius kept his word, returning the region to the legitimate ruler, Mastanesosus. In exchange, Mastanesosus granted him use of the region of Tingis as a logistical outpost, which Sertorius then utilized as a staging ground for his subsequent military expeditions into Hispania. In 76 BC. the son of Ascalis, Lepthasa sought to lay claim to the region of Tingis and proclaimed himself king; while the specific details of this event remain unclear, it appears that Mastanesosus ultimately succeeded in defeating him and bringing the region entirely under his own control.

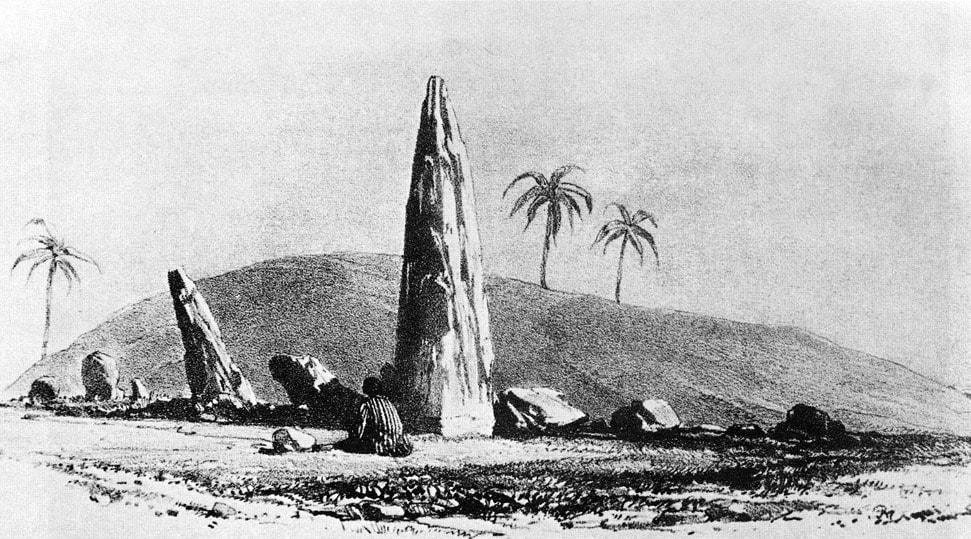
The image represents the archaeological site of Msoura, the probable tomb of the giant king Antaeus at city of Tingis also venerated by Sertorius.

=== Caesar's Civil War ===
Following the death of King Mastanesosus in 49 BC, the kingdom of Mauretania was divided into a diarchy: the territory was administered jointly by two rulers, Bogud in the western region, with his capital at Tingis, and his elder brother, Bocchus II, in the eastern part, with his capital at Iol. This historical period was marked by a civil conflict between the factions of Pompey and Caesar; the Mauretanian kingdom aligned itself with the Caesarians, while neighboring Numidia sided with the Pompeians.

In 48 BC, in the province of Hispania Ulterior, the Caesarian governor Quintus Cassius Longinus lost control of the territory due to his tyrannical rule and an internal rebellion. To prevent the Caesarian forces from losing their grip on the region, Bogud intervened by crossing the Strait of Gibraltar with his troops; he restored order and temporarily occupied the territory militarily, pending the arrival of reinforcements for the Caesarian side. Pompey interpreted this move as an act of belligerence in support of Caesar. In retaliation, in 47 BC, Pompeius the Younger, son of Pompey the Great, attempted to strike at Mauretania by laying siege to the city of Ascurum. The endeavor, however, ended in a total defeat, forcing Pompeius the Younger to retreat toward the Balearic Islands.

Between 47 and 46 BC, Caesar landed in Africa to confront the Pompeian forces and their ally, the Numidian king Juba I, who held a clear numerical superiority. To overcome this disadvantage, Caesar coordinated a strategic maneuver involving the Mauretania kingdom and the Roman mercenary commander Publius Sittius who worked for Bocchus II. While Caesar’s troops engaged the bulk of the Pompeian and Numidian army in the province of Africa, Bogud, Bocchus II, and Sittius launched a counterattack, penetrating deep into Numidian territory. Bogud kept the Pompeian forces and those of Massinissa II occupied in western Numidia, while Bocchus II and Sittius moved rapidly and covertly into eastern Numidia, capturing key strategic centers including the city of Cirta.

News of the invasion of his kingdom forced Juba I to abandon the main front and rush to the defense of his kingdom. Deprived of his Numidian allies, the Pompeian general Metellus Scipio found himself isolated and suffered a decisive defeat at the Battle of Thapsus in 46 BC. Following this victory, Numidia was partitioned: the western portion was annexed to Mauretania, a section of the east was granted to Publius Sittius as an autonomous kingdom, and the remainder was integrated into the Roman African territories.

Depiction of the Battle of Thapsus.

In 45 BC, following the African campaign, Caesar traveled to Hispania Ulterior to crush the final resistance led by the sons of Pompey. Finding himself once again at a strategic disadvantage against Pompeian troops who held the high ground, Caesar requested support from Bogud. The conflict culminated in the Battle of Munda. In the early stages of the engagement, Caesar’s lines nearly collapsed under enemy pressure, to break the stalemate, Bogud led his Moorish cavalry in a flanking maneuver, striking the Pompeian lines from the rear. The opposing general, Titus Labienus, spotted the movement and dispatched a portion of his own troops to intercept it. This tactical maneuver was mistakenly interpreted by the Pompeian soldiers as the beginning of a retreat, sparking widespread panic and paving the way for the decisive victory of the Caesarian faction.

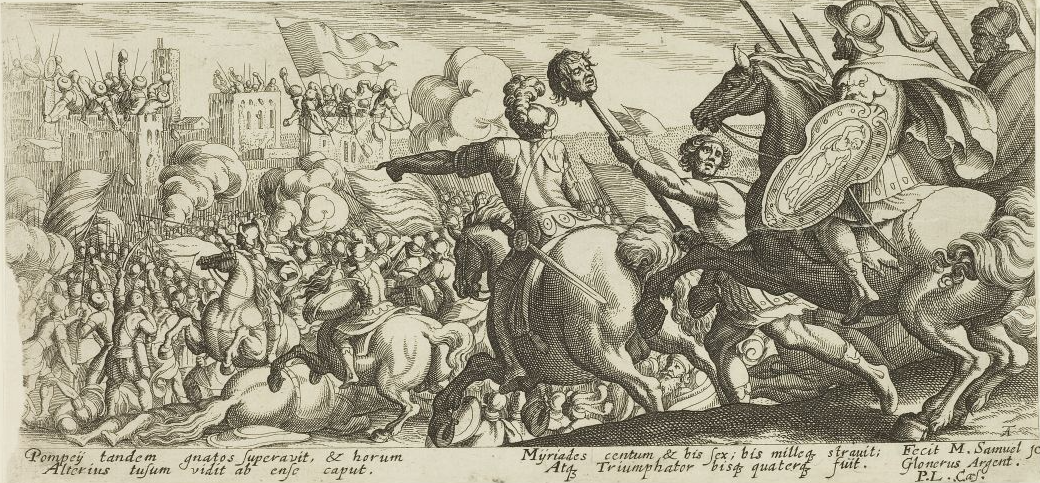
Depiction of the Battle of Munda.

=== Internal conflicts ===
In 44 BC, Arabio, son of King Masinissa II, returned to North Africa after hiding in Hispania. Landing in western Numidia, now part of Mauretania, with a surviving army of the Pompeian faction, Arabio convinced the local population to revolt against Mauretanian rule, managing to regain control of a part of those territories. He later assassinated Publius Sittius, also taking the region of Cirta.

When in 40 BC the Triumvirs sent Gaius Fuficius Fango to unify the African provinces under a single command, Sextius, Arabio's ally, refused to cede power, sparking a war. Fango invadere and conquered western Numidia, forcing Arabio to flee, but was in turn defeated by Sextius. During the conflict Sextius had Arabio killed because he was afraid he would betray him. After the death of Arabio, Sextius began to invade the region of the kingdom that belonged to Sittius and annexed it to the Roman province of Africa while Bocchus II the old region that he had conquered, which reached the edge of the Ampsaga River (modern Rhumel River).

In 38 BC, Bogud, ally of Mark Antony attempted to invade the Roman province of Hispania, which was aligned with Octavian’s faction. That same year, uprisings against the ruler broke out in the capital, Tingis, the local nobility resented the use of economic resources to support conflicts unrelated to the kingdom’s interests, while the general population was exhausted by constant warfare. Instigated by Octavian, Bocchus II persuaded the nobility and the people to proclaim him the sole, legitimate ruler of all Mauretania.

Stripped of his kingdom Bogud sought refuge in the East with Mark Antony, who promised to restore Mauretania to him in the event of a victory. Meanwhile, in 33 BC, Bocchus II died, bequeathing his kingdom to Octavian. Bogud’s life came to an end in 31 BC during the War of Actium: while commanding the garrison at the stronghold of Methone in the Peloponnese, he was attacked by the Roman general Marcus Vipsanius Agrippa both by land and by sea and was killed during the assault.

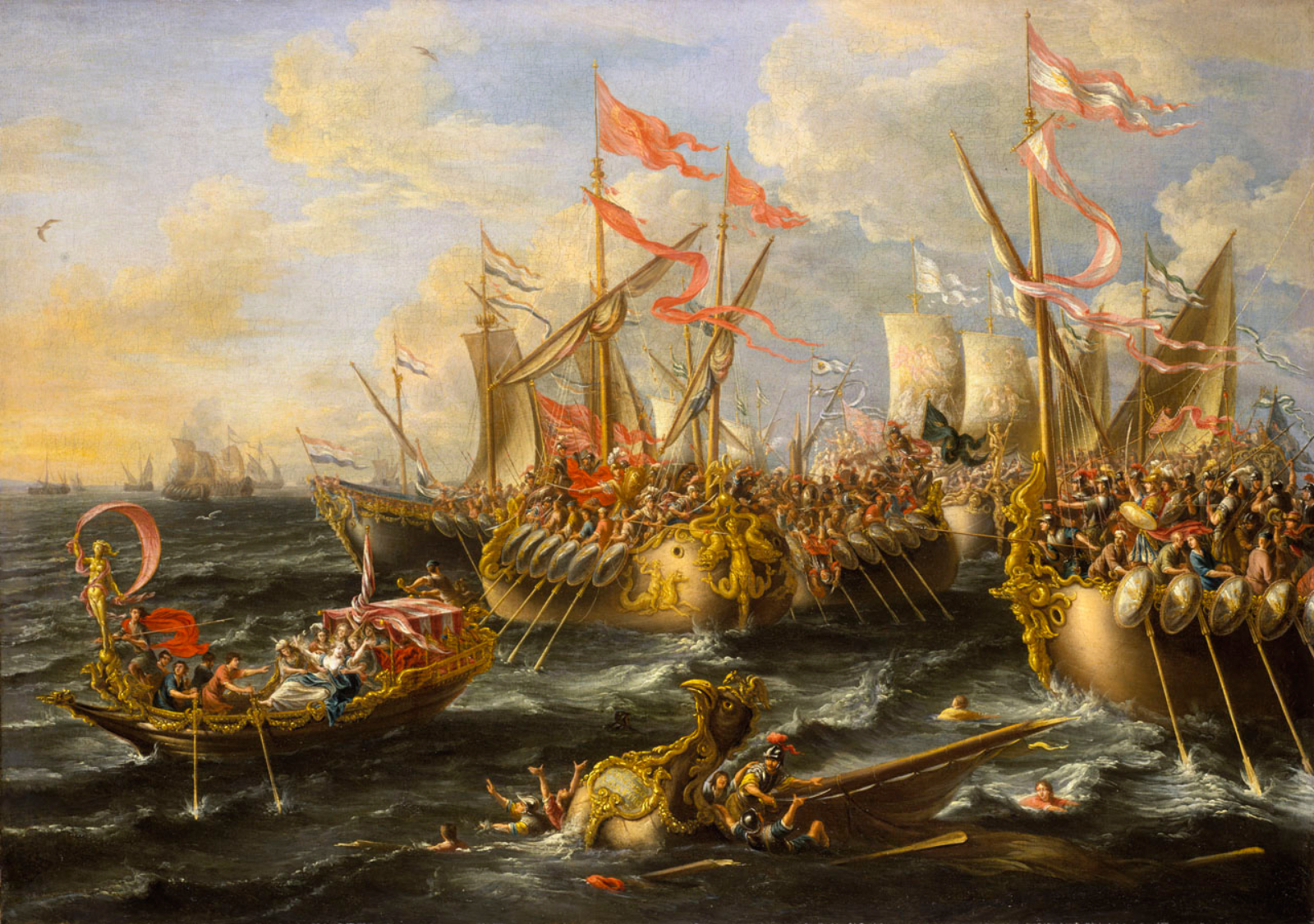
Painting by Laureys in Castro depicting the war of Actium, the war where King Bogud participated and died.

=== Interregnum ===
Following the death of Bocchus II in 33 BC, Augustus sought to annex Mauretania as a province of the Roman Empire, but the local nobility was strongly opposed. Augustus could not force the issue militarily, as the majority of the Roman legions were already engaged in other conflicts. This led to an interregnum lasting approximately eight years (from 33 to 25 BC), during which Augustus temporarily dispatched officials to administer the region while awaiting a compromise with the local elites.

In 25 BC, an agreement was finally reached, Mauretania would not become a Roman province, but rather a client kingdom under the sovereignty of rulers chosen directly by Rome. Augustus selected Juba II, son of the late Numidian king Juba I, who had been educated in Rome, was steeped in Latin culture, and along with Cleopatra Selene II, daughter of his rival Mark Antony and the queen Cleopatra VII. Augustus’s objective was twofold, to entrust the kingdom to someone loyal to him, such as Juba II, while simultaneously removing Cleopatra Selene II from Rome to prevent his political rivals from exploiting her against him.

Territorial extension of Mauretania with blue borders after the death of Bocchus II.

=== Roman Cliental Period ===
In 25 BC, Augustus transformed Mauretania into a client kingdom, appointing Juba II, son of King Juba I, as his ruler. That same year after becoming king of Mauretania, Juba II married Cleopatra Selene II, daughter of Mark Antony and Cleopatra VII. Juba II retained Iol, previously chosen by Bocchus II, as his capital, but renamed it Caesarea in honor of Augustus's adoptive father, Caesar, Volubilis served as the capital and administrative center of the kingdom. Ruling alongside Cleopatra Selene, Juba II drew on the royal treasury amassed by his predecessors moorish kings to rebuild Mauretania's major cities with a Greco-Roman style. He also developed a lucrative purple dye industry on the Atlantic coast, centered in Mogador, based on the harvesting of Bolinus brandaris snails to supply the Roman elite, which brought immense wealth to the kingdom. However, having grown up in Rome, Juba II vigorously promoted Romanization among his subjects, a policy that alienated the local Moorish nobility and sparked frequent popular revolts. In AD 21, Juba II appointed his son Ptolemy of Mauretania as co-ruler, paving the way for his ascension as sole king upon Juba's death in AD 23–24. Ptolemy continued his father's economic legacy, investing heavily in the lucrative purple dye trade and the export of cedar wood. He also provided vital military support to Rome in suppressing the Tacfarinas rebellion. In recognition of his loyalty, the Roman Emperor Caligula invited Ptolemy to Rome or Lugdunum. However, during his stay, Caligula ordered his execution in 40 AD, an act traditionally attributed to envy, though many modern historians suspect Caligula viewed the wealthy client king as a political thret.

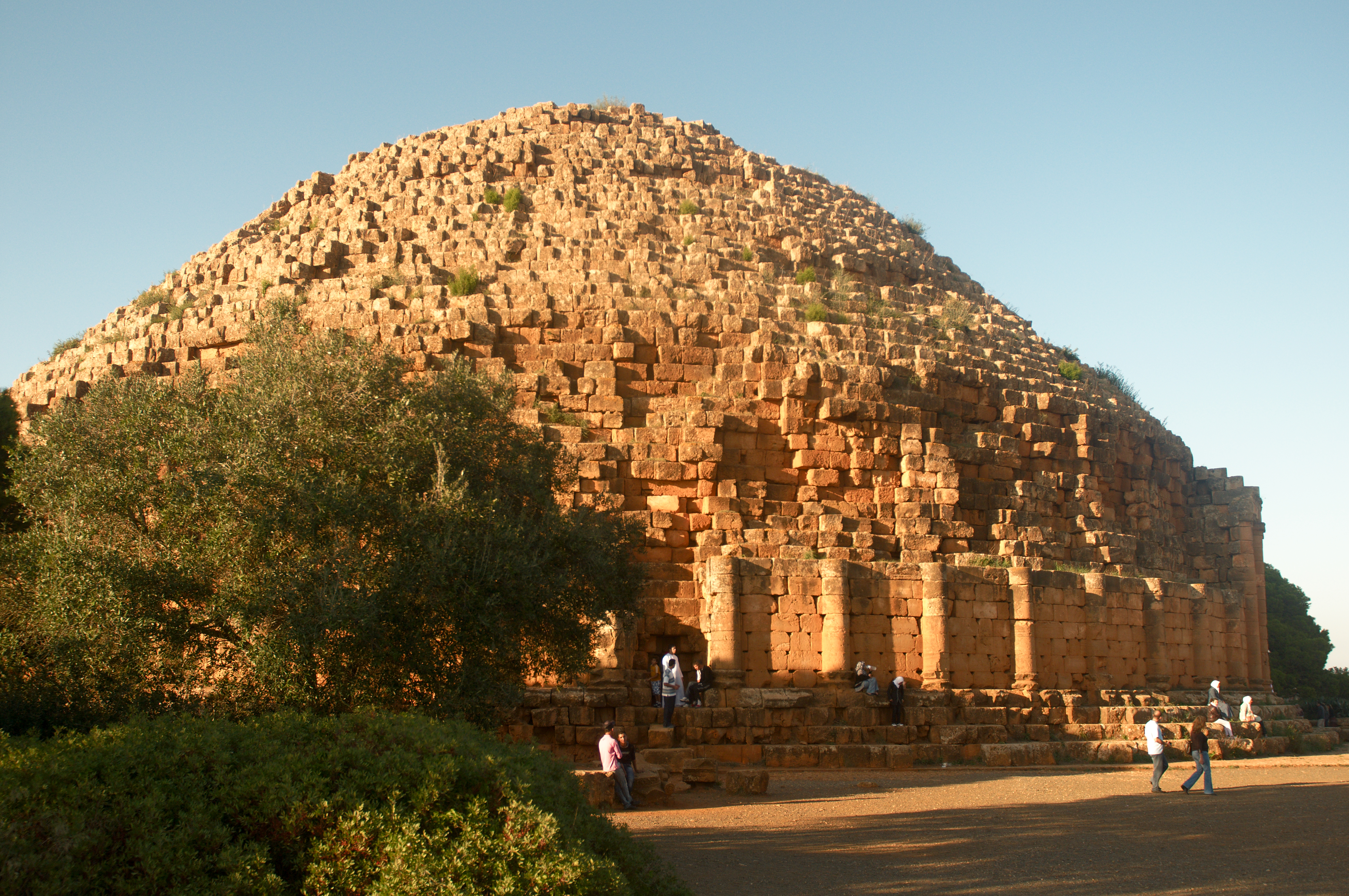
The mausoleum of Juba II and Cleopatra Selene II in Tipaza, Algeria.

=== Rebel Kings Period ===
Following the assassination of Ptolemy of Mauretania in 40 AD, Aedemon, a freedman and servant of Moorish origin, took control of the kingdom’s army. He initiated a violent armed uprising, concentrated primarily in western Mauretania and targeting Roman colonies. Most of the nobility, however, chose to side with Rome in order to preserve their privileges and status. A notable example was Marcus Valerius Severus, the governor of one of the two the capitals, Volubilis, who placed himself at the head of the Moorish nobility and mobilized the nobles' armies to fight against the rebels led by Aedemon. In 42 AD, Aedemon died under unknown circumstances. After his death, Emperor Claudius declared his intention to annex Mauretania to the Roman Empire and divide it into two provinces. However, the death of Aedemon did not bring an end to the hostilities; a Moorish general from the western Mauretania, Sabalus, assumed command of the troops fighting against Rome.

To confront Sabalus, the Emperor Claudius dispatched Gaius Suetonius Paulinus, tasked with suppressing the internal revolts and those in the Atlas Mountains and Gnaeus Hosidius Geta, who was charged with defeating the Moorish army led by Sabalus. After suffering two defeats in open battle, Sabalus adopted a strategy of attrition, retreating into the desert with substantial supplies of water and provisions, confident that the Roman army would pursue him and assuming that such a pursuit would be short lived. The situation for the Roman army soon became desperate, supplies were running low, and they were deep within the Sahara desert. General Geta concluded that their remaining resources were insufficient for a return journey, and that their only chance for survival was to defeat Sabalus and seize the supplies of the Moorish army. A Moorish soldier who had sided with Geta proposed performing a ritual to invoke rain from the god Anzar, a berber deity associated with war, the heavens, and water. Geta, having nothing to lose, agreed, shortly after the ritual was performed, it began to rain in the desert. Witnessing this, General Sabalus interpreted it as a sign that the gods favored the Romans rather than the Moors; he surrendered, shared his resources with the Roman army, and turned back. Following Sabalus’s surrender, Mauretania was officially annexed into the Roman Empire and divided into two provinces: Mauretania Tingitana in the west and Mauretania Caesariensis in the east.

Painting depicting the Berber god Anzar.

=== Failed restoration of the Kingdom ===
In 64 AD, Emperor Nero entrusted the governance of Mauretania Caesariensis to Lucceius Albinus. Subsequently, in 68 AD, Emperor Galba also granted him control over Mauretania Tingitana, thereby placing him in command of several legions. With the outbreak of the civil war that followed Nero's death, Albinus chose to side with Otho, going so far as to threaten the province of Hispania Baetica. However, following Otho's defeat and suicide, Albinus refused to recognize the new emperor, Vitellius, and began to contemplate severing ties with Rome. In 69 AD, he adopted the name Juba III and declared himself the king of Mauretania.

The new emperor, Vitellius, acted almost immediately, he instructed the forces in the province of Hispania to feign preparations for an invasion of Mauretania Tingitana, thereby sowing chaos in the region while covertly assassinating the Moorish generals who remained loyal to Albinus. Albinus attempted to travel to Mauretania Caesariensis to regroup and confront Vitellius, but upon his arrival, he found assassins waiting for him, they attacked and killed both him and his wife.

=== Monarchs ===
Name	Reign	Notes	Image
Atlas	6th Century BC	Mythical king of Mauretania	
Bagas	fl. 225 BC		
Bocchus I	c. 110 – c. 80s BC		
Mastanesosus	c. 80s BC – 49		
Bogud	49 – c. 38 BC	Co-ruler with Bocchus II	
Bocchus II	49 – c. 33 BC	Co-ruler with Bogud	
Juba II	25 BC – AD 23	Roman client king	
Cleopatra Selene II	25 BC – 5 BC	Co-ruler with Juba II	
Ptolemy	20 – 40 AD	Last king of Mauretania; Began reign as co-ruler with Juba II; Assassinated by Caligula	
Aedemon	40 – 42 AD	First rebel king of Mauretania	
Sabalus	42 – 44 AD	Last rebel king of Mauretania	
Lucceius Albinus	69 AD	Last rebel king of Mauretania	

== Organization of the kingdom ==
=== Form of government ===
The ancient kingdom of Mauretania was a monarchy in which the throne passed to the eldest son; however, unlike other monarchs of the era, the ruler did not possess absolute power. His control over the territory was rather weak, as the interior of the kingdom was divided into small areas governed by highly independent nobles whom the Romans commonly referred to as "princes." As the historian Sallust recounts in his account of the Jugurthine War, the king was required to convene an assembly known as a "consilium" before making any significant decisions. This body was composed of three distinct groups: the royal family, the high nobles/princes, and the lesser nobility alongside court officials. For any political course of action, an agreement had to be reached among all three groups, resulting in a collective decision.

=== Military ===
The army of Mauretania consisted of two distinct components. The royal guard was a relatively small force of elite soldiers whom the king could deploy at his sole discretion and without restriction. The main army, by contrast, was formed by uniting smaller contingents, each raised by an individual prince/high-ranking noble. To mobilize this larger force, the king had to convene a consilium and present the nobles with compelling justifications for the campaign. During the period of diarchy, seeking to lessen their reliance on the nobility, Bogud and Bocchus II adopted independent strategies: Bogud built up a naval fleet, effectively integrating its crews into his personal forces, while Bocchus II turned to mercenaries, most notably the mercenary army of Publius Sittius.

== Economy ==
Initially, Mauretania was a very insular kingdom, with limited trade conducted almost exclusively with Numidia and Carthage. Following the war against Jugurtha, however, relations with Rome improved, and the kingdom became a supplier of goods for Roman markets.

One of its most notable activities was the capture of wild animals destined for Roman amphitheaters, including the Barbary lion, the Carthaginian elephant, the Atlas bear, and the leopard. In addition to animals, Mauretania exported large quantities of grain, olive oil, and wine, as well as salted fish and garum, a fish sauce highly prized by the Romans.

Among its luxury goods was thuja wood, a fragrant, richly grained timber from the Atlas Mountains, which was used to craft exceptionally expensive tables and furniture for the homes of Roman nobles. Later, when Mauretania became a client kingdom, King Juba II invested heavily in the production of dyes, most notably a purple hue derived from marine mollusks found along the Atlantic coast of Morocco, near Mogador. In Rome, this color was extremely rare and costly, serving as the ultimate symbol of wealth and power.

== Roman province(s) ==
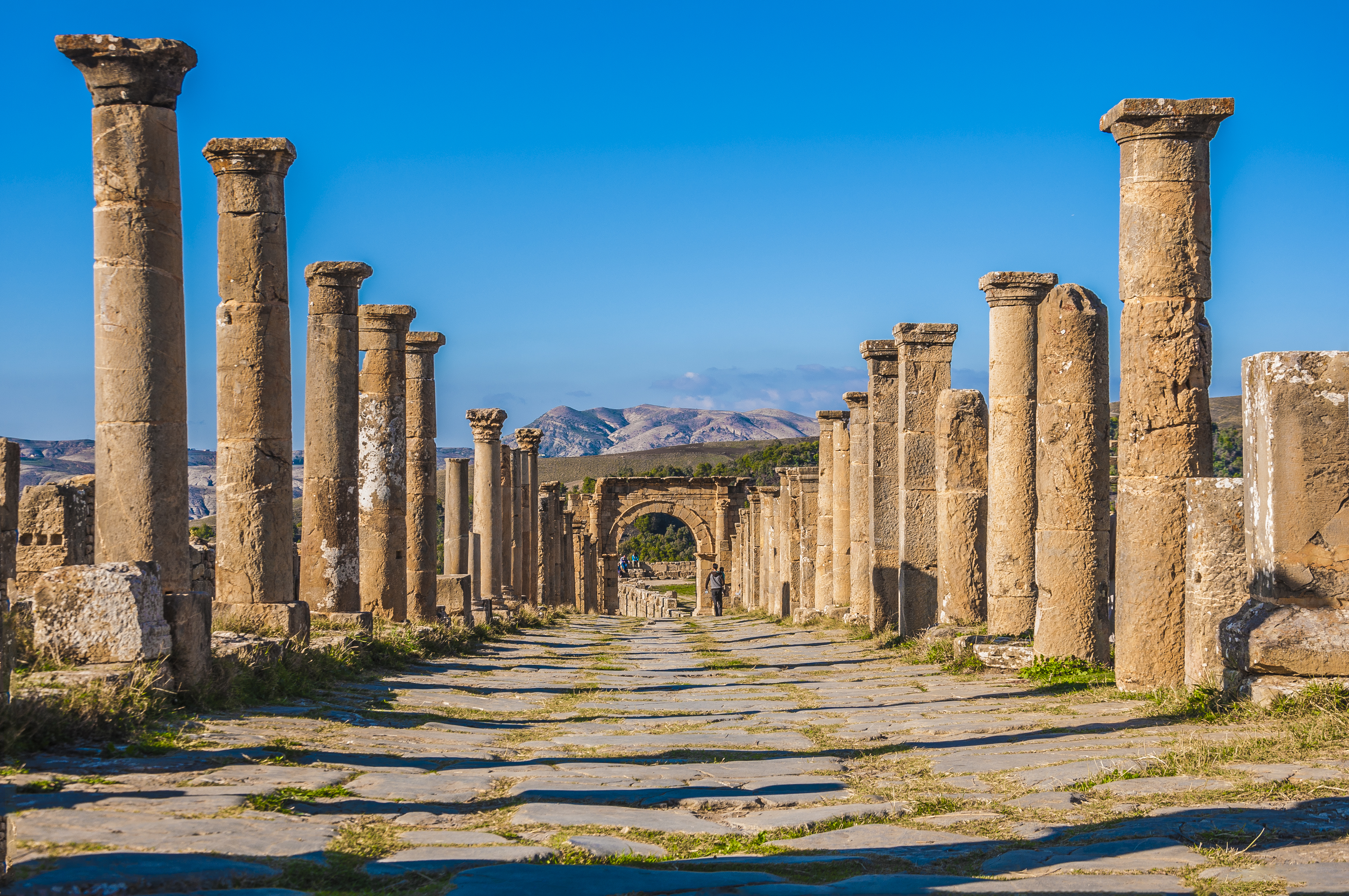
Ruins of the Roman town of Cuicul in Djemila

In the 1st century AD, Emperor Claudius divided the Roman province of Mauretania into Mauretania Caesariensis and Mauretania Tingitana along the line of the Mulucha (Muluya) River, about 60 km west of modern Oran:

- Mauretania Tingitana was named after its capital Tingis (now Tangier); it corresponded to northern Morocco (including the current Spanish enclaves).
- Mauretania Caesariensis was named after its capital Caesarea (now Cherchell); and comprised western and central Algeria.

Mauretania gave the empire one emperor, the equestrian Macrinus. He seized power after the assassination of Caracalla in 217 but was himself defeated and executed by Elagabalus the next year.

Emperor Diocletian's Tetrarchy reform (293) further divided the area into three provinces, as the small, easternmost region of Sitifensis was split off from Mauretania Caesariensis.

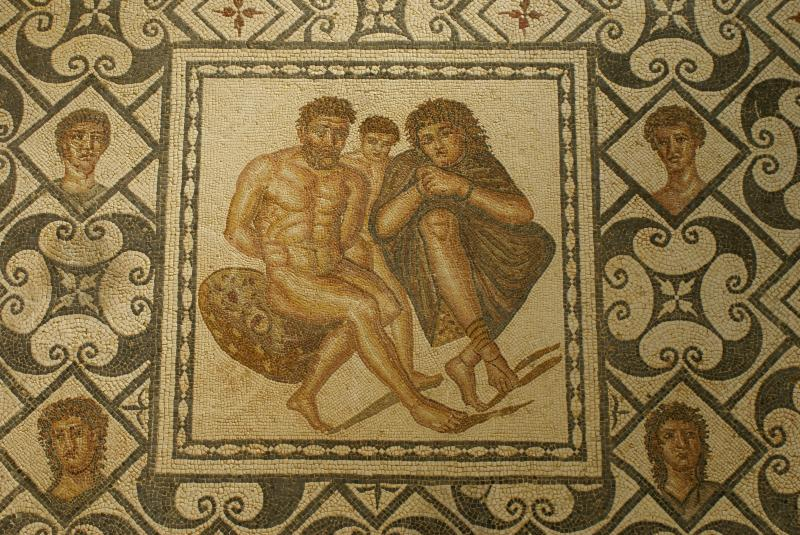
Mosaic work depicting Berbers in chains, Tipasa in the Roman province Mauretania Caesariensis

The Notitia Dignitatum (c. 400) mentions them as still existing, two being under the authority of the Vicarius of the diocese of Africa:

- A Dux et praeses provinciae Mauritaniae et Caesariensis, i.e. a Roman governor of the rank of Vir spectabilis, who also held the high military command of dux, as the superior of eight border garrison commanders, each styled Praepositus limitis ..., followed by (genitive forms) Columnatensis, Vidensis, inferioris (i.e. lower border), Fortensis, Muticitani, Audiensis, Caputcellensis and Augustensis.
- A (civilian) Praeses in the province of Mauretania Sitifensis.

And, under the authority of the Vicarius of the diocese of Hispaniae:

- A Comes rei militaris of Mauretania Tingitana, also ranking as vir spectabilis, in charge of the following border garrison (Limitanei) commanders:
  - Praefectus alae Herculeae at Tamuco
  - Tribunus cohortis secundae Hispanorum at Duga
  - Tribunus cohortis primae Herculeae at Aulucos
  - Tribunus cohortis primae Ityraeorum at Castrabarensis
  - Another Tribunus cohortis at Sala
  - Tribunus cohortis Pacatianensis at Pacatiana
  - Tribunus cohortis tertiae Asturum at Tabernas
  - Tribunus cohortis Friglensis at the Fortress of Friglas or Frigias, near Lixus
  and to whom three extraordinary cavalry units were assigned:
  - Equites scutarii seniores
  - Equites sagittarii seniores
  - Equites Cordueni
- A Praeses (civilian governor) of the same province of Tingitana

== Late Antiquity ==
=== Mauro-Roman Kingdom ===
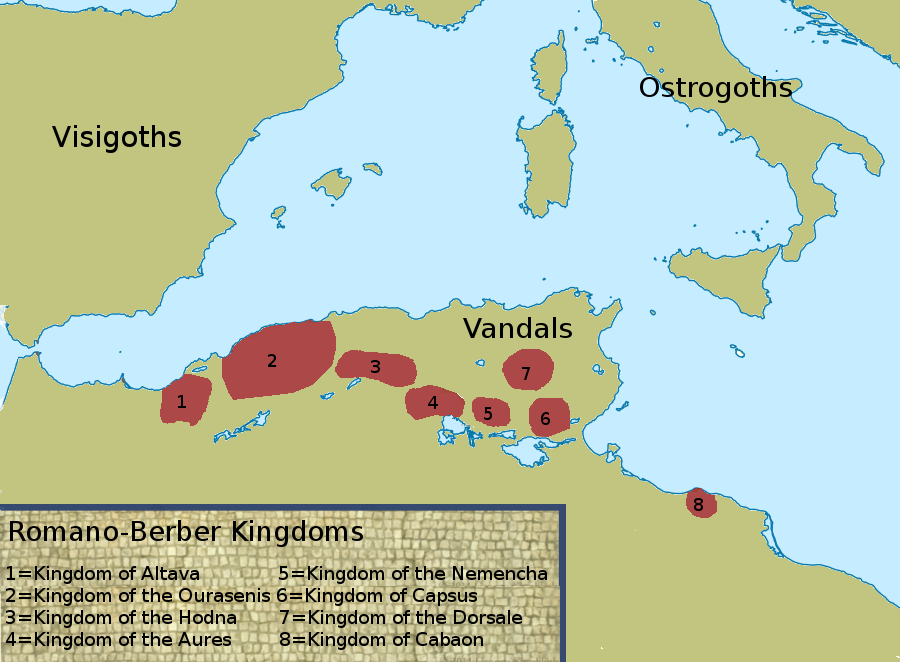
Map depicting later Romano-Berber Kingdoms of northern Africa

During the crisis of the 3rd century, parts of Mauretania were reconquered by Berber tribes. Direct Roman rule became confined to a few coastal cities (such as Septem in Mauretania Tingitana and Cherchell in Mauretania Caesariensis) by the late 3rd century.

Historical sources about inland areas are sparse, but these were apparently controlled by local Berber rulers who, however, maintained a degree of Roman culture, including the local cities, and usually nominally acknowledged the suzerainty of the Roman Emperors.

The Western kingdom more distant from the Vandal kingdom was the one of Altava, a city located at the borders of Mauretania Tingitana and Caesariensis....It is clear that the Mauro-Roman kingdom of Altava was fully inside the Western Latin world, not only because of location but mainly because it adopted the military-religious-sociocultural-administrative organization of the Roman Empire...

In an inscription from Altava in western Algeria, one of these rulers, Masuna, described himself as rex gentium Maurorum et Romanorum (king of the Roman and Moorish peoples). Altava was later the capital of another ruler, Garmul or Garmules, who resisted Byzantine rule in Africa but was finally defeated in 578.

The Byzantine historian Procopius also mentions another independent ruler, Mastigas, who controlled most of Mauretania Caesariensis in the 530s. In the 7th century there were eight Romano-Moorish kingdoms: Altava, Ouarsenis, Hodna, Aures, Nemenchas, Capsa, Dorsale, and Cabaon.

The last resistance against the Arab invasion was sustained in the second half of the 7th century mainly by the Roman-Moorish kingdoms -with the last Byzantine troops in the region- under the leadership of the Christian king of Altava Caecilius, but later ended in complete defeat in 703 AD (when the queen Kahina died in battle).

=== Vandal kingdom ===
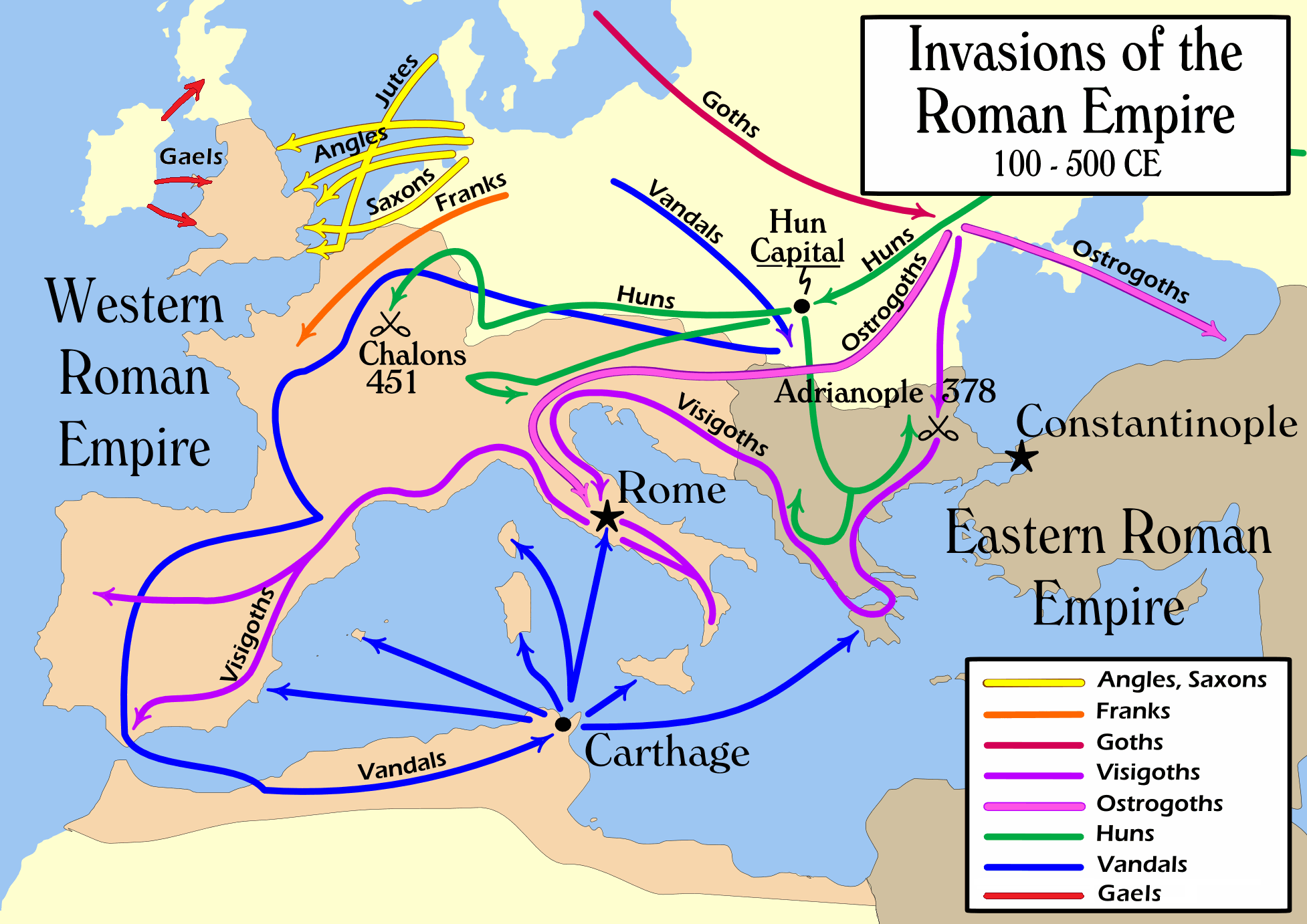
Routes taken by Vandal invaders during the Migration Period, 5th century AD

The Vandals conquered the Roman province beginning in the 420s.

The city of Hippo Regius fell to the Vandals in 431 after a prolonged siege, and Carthage also fell in 439. Theodosius II dispatched an expedition to deal with the Vandals in 441, which failed to progress farther than Sicily. The Western Empire under Valentinian III secured peace with the Vandals in 442, confirming their control of Proconsular Africa. For the next 90 years, Africa was firmly under the Vandal control. The Vandals were ousted from Africa in the Vandalic War of 533–534, from which time Mauretania at least nominally became a Roman province once again.

The old provinces of the Roman Diocese of Africa were mostly preserved by the Vandals, but large parts, including almost all of Mauretania Tingitana, much of Mauretania Caesariensis and Mauretania Sitifensis and large parts of the interior of Numidia and Byzacena, had been lost to the inroads of Berber tribes, now collectively called the Mauri (later Moors) as a generic term for "the Berber tribes in the province of Mauretania".

=== Praetorian prefecture of Africa ===
In 533, the Roman army under Belisarius defeated the Vandals. In April 534, Justinian published a law concerning the administrative organization of the newly acquired territories. Nevertheless, Justinian restored the old administrative division, but raised the overall governor at Carthage to the supreme administrative rank of praetorian prefect, thereby ending the Diocese of Africa's traditional subordination to the Prefecture of Italy (then still under Ostrogoth rule).

=== Exarchate of Africa ===
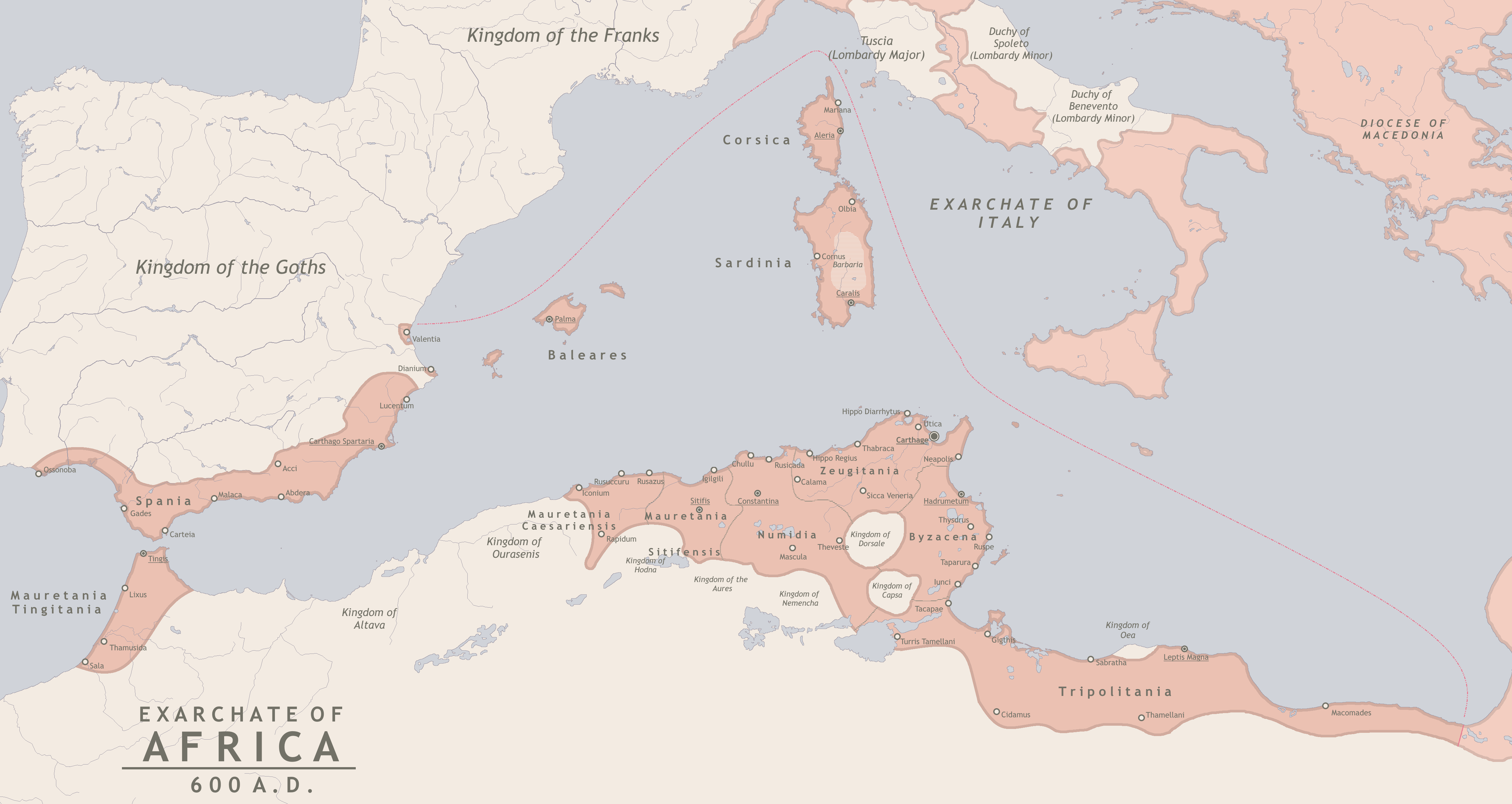
Map of the Exarchate of Africa within the Byzantine Empire in 600 AD

The emperor Maurice sometime between 585 and 590 AD created the office of "Exarch", which combined the supreme civil authority of a praetorian prefect and the military authority of a magister militum, and enjoyed considerable autonomy from Constantinople. Two exarchates were established, one in Italy, with seat at Ravenna (hence known as the Exarchate of Ravenna), and one in Africa, based at Carthage and including all imperial possessions in the Western Mediterranean. The first African exarch was the patricius Gennadius.

Mauretania Caesariensis and Mauretania Sitifensis were merged to form the new province of Mauretania Prima, while Mauretania Tingitana, effectively reduced to the city of Septem, was combined with the citadels of the Spanish coast (Spania) and the Balearic Islands to form Mauretania Secunda. The African exarch was in possession of Mauretania Secunda, which was little more than a tiny outpost in southern Spain, beleaguered by the Visigoths.

The last Spanish strongholds were conquered by the Visigoths in 624 AD, reducing "Mauretania Seconda" opposite Gibraltar to only the fort of Septem.

== Religion ==
Christianity is known to have existed in Mauretania as early as the 3rd century. It spread rapidly in these areas despite its relatively late appearance in the region. Although it was adopted in the urban areas of Mauretania Caesariensis, the hinterlands retained the Romano-Berber religion.

== See also ==
- Gaetuli tribe (namesake of Getulia)
- Mauretania Caesariensis
- Mauretania Tingitana
- Mauretania Sitifensis
- Victor Maurus, a Christian Mauretanian martyr and saint
- Zeno of Verona
