= Hassan II Dam =

Dam in Midelt, Morocco

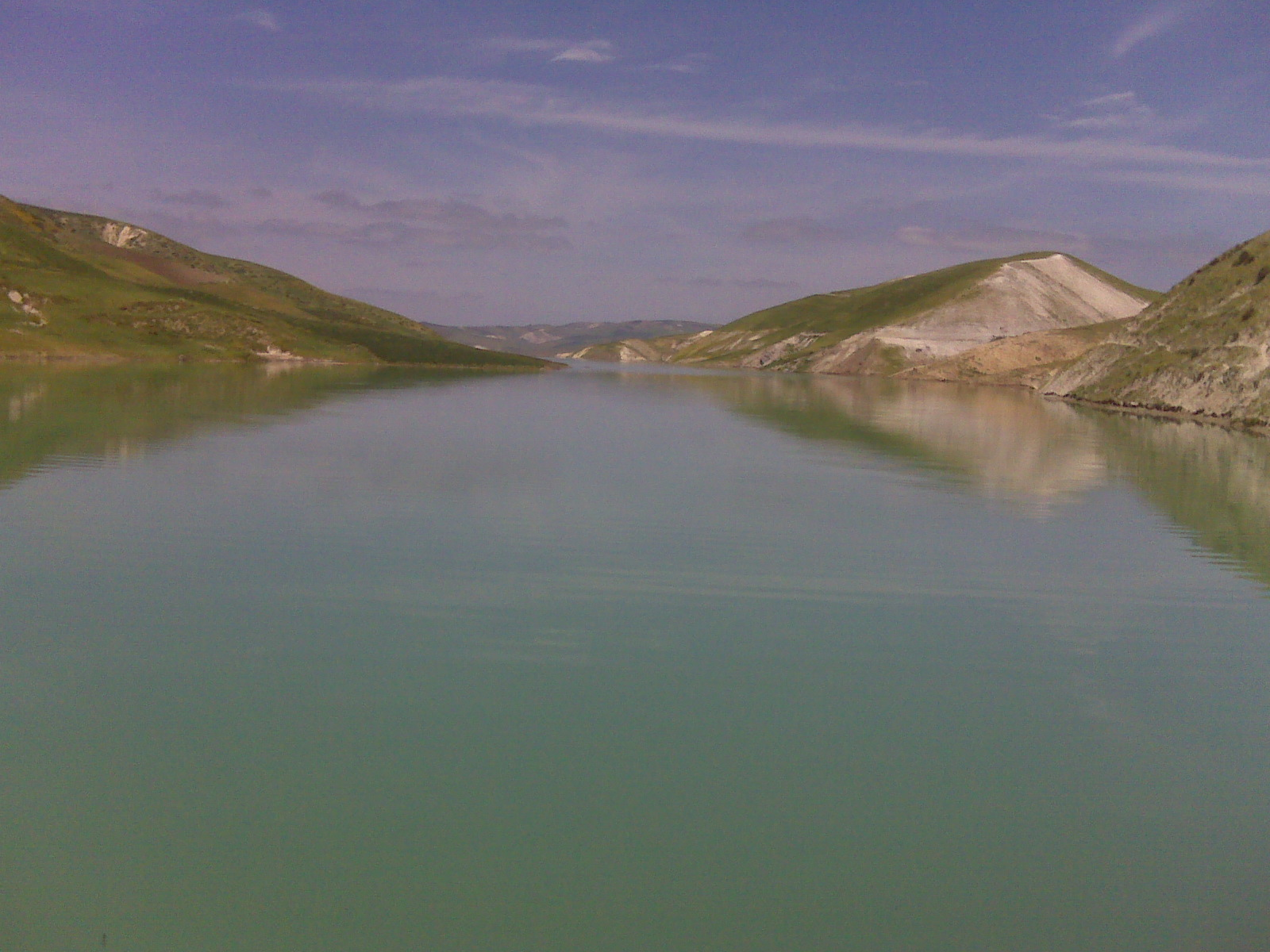
- Interactive map of Hassan II Dam
- Country: Morocco
- Location: Midelt
- Coordinates: 32°47′29″N 4°46′05″W
- Purpose: Flood control, water supply, irrigation
- Status: Operational
- Construction began: February 2001
- Opening date: March 2005

Dam and spillways
- Type of dam: Gravity, roller-compacted concrete
- Impounds: Moulouya River
- Height: 122 m (400 ft)
- Length: 577 m (1,893 ft)
- Width (crest): 7 m (23 ft)
- Dam volume: 690,000 m^{3} (902,486 cu yd)

Reservoir
- Total capacity: 400,000,000 m^{3} (324,285 acre⋅ft)
- Catchment area: 3,300 km^{2} (1,274 mi^{2})
- Surface area: 12.7 km^{2} (5 mi^{2})
- Normal elevation: 1,370 m (4,495 ft)

The Hassan II Dam, also known as the Sidi Said Dam, is a gravity dam on the Moulouya River about 13 km (8.1 mi) north of Midelt in Midelt Province, Morocco. It has a maximum storage capacity of 400 million cubic meters. The dam is used for potable water, irrigation and the protection of downstream areas and dams against floods and siltation. Construction of the dam began in February 2001 and it was completed in March 2005.
