= Sabalus =

- Rebel leader in Mauretania, possibly a king

Rebel king in Mauretania
- Reign: 42-44
- Predecessor: Aedemon
- Successor: End of the revolt (Albinus revolted in 69)
- Died: after 44 place unknown
- Military career
- Allegiance: Mauretania
- Conflicts: Aedemon's Revolt

Sabalus was a Berber warrior from Mauretania, North Africa sometimes referred to as a maurish king who lived in the 1st century. Sabalus was one of the tribal chiefs in the Roman Client Kingdom of Mauretania. Little is known of Sabalus’ origins.

In late 40, king Ptolemy of Mauretania was murdered by his unstable second cousin Roman Emperor Caligula, while on a visit to Rome. A former slave of Ptolemy's, Aedemon, from his outrage and to the loyalty and memory of his former master, wanted to avenge Ptolemy and started the revolt in the Kingdom of Mauretania against Rome. Many people from the kingdom had joined in the revolt. Sabalus became a supporter to Aedemon and was among the chief rebels.

Caligula was murdered on 24 January in the year 41, and his paternal uncle Claudius became the new Emperor. In 42, Claudius had appointed the skilled Roman Generals Gaius Suetonius Paulinus and Gnaeus Hosidius Geta to end the revolt. This was a four-year bloody and violent revolt. The revolt erupted instantly. Sabalus and his fellow rebels were hard skilled fighters. The Berbers were able to survive in the harsh Sahara conditions, while the Romans struggled.

Geta and his troops had defeated Sabalus twice after Geta gathered sufficient water to pursue him in the desert. At one point the water had begun to run out. Geta was doubtful whether to retreat or continue to pursue Sabalus, however a local Berber persuaded him to perform a local rain ritual. When Geta had completed the rain ritual, rain began to fall from the heavens. Sabalus had witnessed this, thinking that Geta had possessed supernatural powers. Sabalus and his men surrendered to Geta. Sabalus’ fate afterwards is unknown.

== Sabalus in other media ==
- Sabalus is mentioned in Claudius the God. Here Geta puts him to death without orders from the Emperor Claudius.

== See also ==
- Aedemon
- Gnaeus Hosidius Geta
- Gaius Suetonius Paulinus
- Ptolemy of Mauretania

== Sources ==
- Ancient Library
