= Aedemon =

1st century Berber freedman from Mauretania

Rebel leader in Mauretania
- Reign: 40-42
- Successor: Roman conquest (Sabalus)
- Died: 42; Mauretania
- Military career
- Allegiance: Mauretania
- Conflicts: Aedemon's Revolt

Aedemon (Greek: Αἰδήμων) was a freedman of North African origins from Mauretania who lived in the 1st century AD. Aedemon was a loyal former household slave to the client King Ptolemy of Mauretania who led an uprising against Roman rule in Mauretania in 40 AD after his former master's murder.

== Context of the revolt ==
Ptolemy was murdered in unknown circumstances while on a visit in Rome on order of his unstable second cousin, the Roman Emperor Caligula in late 40. From loyalty and memory of his former master, Aedemon wanted to avenge Ptolemy and started the revolt in the Kingdom of Mauretania against Rome. Few people from the kingdom joined in the revolt, however. One inscription from Volubilis, a major town of the kingdom, shows that at least a significant part of the town's population fought against Aedemon. The power vacuum created an opportunity for indigenous tribes to assume independence. Consequently, the Roman annexation implied the reassurance of tribal allegiance by fighting tribal chiefs like Sabalus. By then, Caligula had been murdered on January 24, 41 and his paternal uncle Claudius had become the new emperor.

== After his death ==
Aedemon ended dying after two years of revolt due to unknown causes, after his death, Mauretania was completely annnexed by Rome but he was still succeeded by Sabalus who kept fighting until 44 AD.

It is unsure whether M. Licinius Crassus Frugi had been sent to Mauretania before, but Pliny relates that the Roman generals Gaius Suetonius Paulinus and Gnaeus Hosidius Geta were appointed by Emperor Claudius in 42 to fill the power vacuum, reinstate central power and subjugate rebellious nomadic tribes. Paulinus became the first Roman to cross the Atlas Mountains during the campaign. Tingi, modern Tangier, was partially destroyed during the battles against the Romans. The revolt ended in 44, after a decisive battle in which the Romans inflicted large casualties on the Berbers and offered terms to the survivors; Sabalus and his troops subsequently surrendered to Geta. Claudius decided to divide the kingdom into two Roman provinces, Mauretania Tingitana and Mauretania Caesariensis, while Tingi was later rebuilt.

== Sources ==
- https://web.archive.org/web/20120424103223/http://www.sitedevolubilis.org/www/english/about/history.htm
- https://web.archive.org/web/20070403131736/http://www.fanaticus.org/DBA/armies/II40-57.html
- https://web.archive.org/web/20110711020708/http://silha.fortunecity.com/tingitane.htm
- Vanacker, Wouter (2013). Ties of Resistance and Cooperation. Aedemon, Lusius Quietus and the Baquates. Mnemosyne 66 (4–5), 708 – 733
