= Mastanesosus =

King of Mauretania

- King of Mauretania
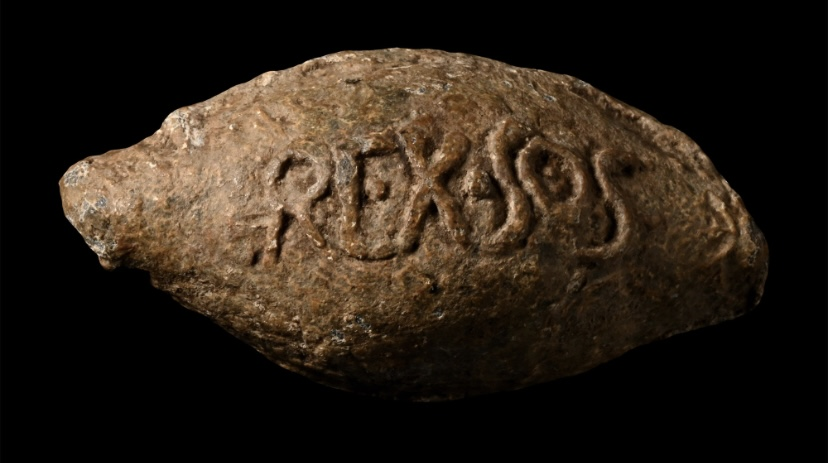
- Lead sling-bullet in the name of king Mastanesosus with the inscription "REX SOS" (King Sos)

King of Mauretania
- Reign: 80 BC–49 BC
- Predecessor: Bocchus I
- Successor: Bocchus II (east), Bogud (west)
- Rival king: Lephtasa (c. 77–74 BC)
- Died: c.49 BC; Kingdom of Mauretania
- Issue: Bocchus II; Bogud (possibly)
- Numidian: ⵙⵓⵙⵓⵙ ⵓ ⵡⴽⴽⵓⵙ
- Punic: 𐤌𐤔𐤕𐤍𐤑𐤍
- Father: Bocchus I

Mastanesosus (or Sosus or Sus, Punic: 𐤌𐤔𐤕𐤍𐤑𐤍, mštnṣn) was a Berber king of Mauretania and son of Bocchus I. He ruled from Iol from 80 BC to 49 BC.

== Name ==
The name Mastanesosus is of Libyco-Berber origin. It is formed from the element (a)mastan, meaning "protector" or "defender," which derives from the Berber verb mesten ("to protect" or "to defend"). In antiquity, this term likely served as a formal title.

The name belongs to a specific Libyco-Berber anthroponomy (often recorded in Punic or Latin inscriptions as MSTNSN or MSTNZN) that may be reconstructed as *Mastan-SĂN, meaning "Their protector." This naming convention was prevalent among the Numidian and Mauretanian kings but disappeared entirely by the Middle Ages.

== Evidence ==
The little information known about King Mastanesosus comes from coins bearing the inscription "REX BOCCHVS SOSI F" (Bocchus II son of Sosus), in addition to a reference by Cicero in his book In Vatinum, where he detailed an itinerary by Publius Vatinius through North Africa. Vatinius had allegedly met King Mastanesosus in person in 62 BC.

Some historians, such as Stéphane Gsell, have confused Mastanesosus with Massinissa II of Numidia. The archaeological evidence and Cicero's reference however leave little doubt that a king named Sosus had ruled Mauretania after Bocchus I and before Bogud and Bocchus II, as had originally been conjectured by American archaeologist Duane W. Roller.

Additional evidence of the existence of a king of Mauretania named Sos or Sosus came in 2020, when a sling-bullet was discovered bearing the Latin inscription "Rex Sos" (King Sos). The sling-bullet may have come from a battle that was fought by Sosus's army or in his name.

== Reign ==
The end of Bocchus I's reign may have been weak due to his old age, and Mastanesosus's reign probably started on shaky grounds, since at the beginning of his rule, Tingi and its region were independent and ruled as such by a princely family, namely by Iephtas, then his son Ascalis. General Sertorius helped dethrone prince Ascalis around 80–81 BC, and thereby restored King Mastanesosus as ruler over the region of Tangier. It was during this campaign that general Sertorius reported visiting the tomb of Antaeus, probably at Mzoura cromlech.

Sallustius reports that, around 77–74 BC, a certain person was sent out of Mauretania in the custody of a king named Leptasta, interpreted by Stéphane Gsell to be the same as "Iephtas". This puts a large question as to when and how Mastanesosus became king, and how much control he had over the Kingdom of Mauretania. Apart from these little snippets of events, little is known about Mauretania during the 30 years that followed the death of King Bocchus I.
