= Hiarbas (king) =

Numidian king

Hiarbas II
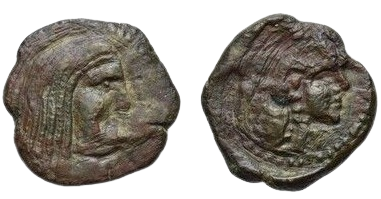
- On the left, the bust of Hiarbas, on the right, the head of Africa facing right, wearing an elephant skin headdress.

King of Numidia
- Reign: 81–79 BC
- Predecessor: Hiempsal II
- Successor: Hiempsal II
- Died: c. 79 BC
- Greek: Ἱάρβας (Hiárbas)
- Father: Gauda (uncertain)

Hiarbas (died 82/81 BC), also known as Iapon in Latin sources, (Note: According to Camps 2000, possibly related to the name Juba.) was the king of eastern Numidia from in or shortly after 81 BC until his death. His name is sometimes given as Iarbas, Hiartas or Hiarbal. Hiarbas may be the historical inspiration for the legendary figure of Iarbas, rejected suitor of Dido, described by Virgil as a Gaetulian.

== Biography ==
His origins are obscure. He may have been a Gaetulian. He was probably not related to the ruling family of Numidia, which had largely been wiped out following the Jugurthine War in 106. On the death of Gauda in 88, Numidia was divided into a smaller western and a larger eastern kingdom. Hiempsal II inherited the eastern kingdom, but was immediately confronted by a revolt led by Hiarbas. He was deposed and Hiarbas, who would have been regarded as a usurper by the Romans, seized the throne.

After their defeat in the Roman civil war of 83–82, the supporters of Marius fled or were exiled to the Roman province of Africa. Under Domitius Ahenobarbus they succeeded in taking control of the province and allied with Hiarbas. Pompey the Great was sent to Africa to restore Roman control. In a campaign that lasted a mere forty days, he defeated and killed Domitius and forced Hiarbas to flee. The latter was soon captured near Bulla Regia and executed. Hiempsal was restored to the throne and the Gaetulians were formally placed under his authority. According to Plutarch, Pompey took Numidia from Hiarbas and gave it to Massinissa II. This seems to indicates that the petty kingdom of western Numidia (which belonged to Massinissa) was also formally recognized by the Romans at this time, having perhaps been under Hiarbas' authority. These events took place either in 82 or 81 BC.

== Coinage ==
Several coin types have been tentatively attributed to Hiarbas. They lack legends and their attribution is based largely on the lack of other known coins attributable Hiarbas. These coins, if they belong to the reign of Hiarbas, contain the earliest examples of personification from Numidia. The obverse of three show a long-haired bearded man facing right with a long-haired beardless man wearing an elephant scalp facing right on the reverse. This latter image has been taken to be a personification of Africa. The other coin depicts a bridled horse on the reverse.
