= Bogud =

King of West-Mauretania, ally of Caesar, ally of Mark Anthony

- King of Mauretania
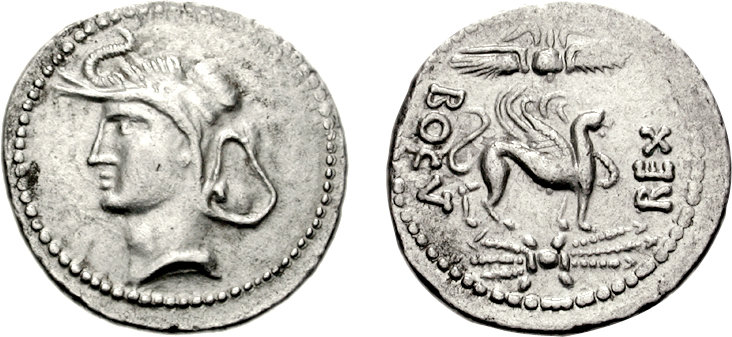
- Denarius of Bogud.

King of Mauretania
- Reign: 49 BC to 38 BC
- Predecessor: Mastanesosus (?)
- Successor: Bocchus II
- Died: 31 BC; Methoni, Pieria
- Spouses: Eunoë
- Numidian: ⴱⵓⴳⵓⴷ
- Father: Uncertain (Note: As said in the article, he might have been a son of Mastanesosus but the lineage is uncertain)
- Military career
- Conflicts: War of Actium; Siege of Methoni

Bogud (died 31 BC) was a Berber king who ruled the western part of Mauretania from 49 BC to 38 BC. He is speculated to have been either the cousin or the brother of Bocchus II, though the lineage is unknown. An important ally of Julius Caesar, Bogud later supported Mark Antony in the power struggle between Antony and Octavian. He was killed at the siege of Methone prior to the Battle of Actium and his territory was seized by Bocchus.

== Biography ==
=== Early career ===
Bogud was married to Eunoë. At an unspecified time he mounted an expedition along the Atlantic coast, seemingly venturing into the tropics. When he returned he presented his wife with gigantic reeds and asparagus he had found on the journey.

=== Support for Caesar ===
Both Bogud and Bocchus backed the Roman general Julius Caesar in his struggle against the supporters of Pompey the Great in Africa (49–45 BC). In an attempt to undermine support for Caesar, Gnaeus Pompey attacked Bogud's territory, but was driven back. This only provoked Bogud into full-scale action against the Pompeians. Caesar sent P. Sitius to aid Bogud in an attack on the territory of King Juba I of Numidia, whose army was advancing to join the Pompeians. Sitius and Bogud captured the town of Cirta, forcing Juba to return home with his army, abandoning the Pompeians.

On Caesar's victory over the Pompeian forces led by Metellus Scipio at the Battle of Thapsus (on the coast of modern Tunisia) in 46 BC, Bocchus was given control of much of Numidia taken from Juba. Bogud also participated in the Battle of Munda, launching an important attack on the rear of the Pompeian army that provoked the Pompeians in a confused reaction that soon broke their forces.

=== Spain ===
During Quintus Cassius Longinus's governorship of Hispania Ulterior, a rebellion occurred which threatened Caesar's regime, which had never been popular in Spain. Cassius asked for support, which Bogud provided. However, Marcus Aemilius Lepidus intervened on Caesar's orders to mediate. Lepidus helped to restore order, but negotiated an agreement with the rebels. A surprise attack by Bogud's auxiliaries was defeated and Cassius was forced to resign. Bogud then withdrew back to Mauretania.

=== Support for Antony ===
After Caesar was assassinated in 44 BC, the two Mauretanian rulers took opposite sides in the split that developed in the Caesarian forces. Bogud supported Mark Antony, while Bocchus stood by Octavian (later the emperor Augustus). About 38 BC, Bocchus seized Bogud's territory while Bogud was campaigning in Spain and forced him to flee to Antony in the east. Bocchus then became sole ruler of Mauretania and was so confirmed by Octavian. Bogud died in Antony's Actium campaign, during the fighting at Methone. On his own death, King Bocchus II willed Mauretania to Octavian in 33 BC.
