= Titus Sextius =

1st century BC Roman legate and governor

Titus Sextius (fl. c. 50–40 BC) was a Roman soldier and governor in Africa.

Sextius' origins are obscure. He belonged to gens Sextia and may have been an Ostian. Some of his descendants achieved consular rank and took the cognomen Africanus in honour of his service in Africa.

Sextius held a command under Julius Caesar during the Gallic Wars in 53–50 BC. He may also have served him during the Roman civil war of 49–45. In 44, he replaced Sallust as governor of the new province of Africa Nova, carved out of the defeated kingdom of Numidia. He supported Mark Antony during the Mutine War of 43, and was consequently ordered by the Senate to send two of his legions to Italy and a further one to Quintus Cornificius in the province of Africa Vetus. After the creation of the Second Triumvirate, of which Antony was a member, in November 43, he was tasked with removing Cornificius. He invaded Africa Vetus and defeated Cornificius, killing him in battle near Utica in 42.

After Utica, Sextius governed both African provinces until, at the request of Lucius Antonius, he surrendered them to Gaius Fuficius Fango in 41. When the Perusine War broke out later that year, he sided with Antony again and recovered both Africas. At the conclusion of the war, he surrendered the provinces to the triumvir Lepidus.
