= Gaius Fuficius Fango =

Ancient Roman soldier and politician (d. 40 BCE)

Gaius Fuficius Fango or Phango (died 40 BCE) was an Ancient Roman military leader and politician. Originally a common soldier, probably of African origin, he was raised to the rank of senator by Julius Caesar.

When, in 40 BCE, Octavianus annexed Numidia and part of Roman Africa to his share of the triumviral provinces, he appointed Fango his prefect. But his title in Numidia was opposed by Titus Sextius, the prefect of Mark Antony. Military conflict ensued, and after mutual defeats and victories, Fango was driven into the hills that bounded the Roman province to the north-west. There, mistaking the rushing of a troop of wild buffaloes for a night attack of Numidian horse, he killed himself.

In Cicero's letters to Atticus, Frangones is probably a misreading for Fangones, and refers to Fango.
