= Bocchus II =

- King of Mauretania
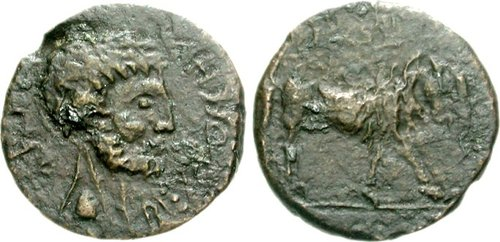
- A bronze coin depicting Bocchus II.

King of Mauretania
- Reign: 49 BC–33 BC
- Predecessor: Mastanesosus
- Successor: 8 years interregnum eventually Juba II
- Rival king: Bogud (49–38 BC)
- Died: 33 BC; Kingdom of Mauretania
- Father: Mastanesosus

Bocchus II was a king of Mauretania in the 1st century BC. He was the son of Mastanesosus, who died in 49 BC.

== Biography ==
He was the son of Mastanesosus, king of Mauretania. His father was identified from the Latin legends of the coins that give the exact lineage Rex Bocchus Sosi f or Sos fi and cannot be read other than "King Bocchus son of Sosus". By 49 BC, Mauretania seems to have been partitioned between Bocchus II and Bogud, who are speculated to have been perhaps cousins or brothers, though the lineage is unknown. Bocchus II ruled over the eastern part of Mauretania and had Iol as capital, while Bogud ruled over the western part of Mauretania and had Volubilis as capital. Only three events are known from his rule: his relations with Sittius, his part in the war against Juba I and the Pompeians, and the annexation of Western Mauretania. He was recognized as king by the Caesarean Senate in 49 BC, but he was previously hostile to Juba and it is unknown when exactly his reign began. It is certain that by this time, him and his brother Bogud, would plead in favor of Caesar against the Pompeians and their ally Juba I, king of Numidia.

=== Conquest of Numidia ===
During the Roman civil war of 49–45 BC, Bocchus and Sittius invaded Numidia, overthrowing Massinissa II, whose kingdom was easily conquered, and seized Cirta within a few days, the capital of the kingdom of Juba I, who was thus obliged to abandon the idea of joining Metellus Scipio against Caesar. Bocchus's actions stopped there, but Sittius continued the fight, beating Saburra, the lieutenant of Juba, capturing Faustus Sulla, and Afranius, leading his fleet to Hippo Regius, where he caught Metellus Scipio's ship rushing. At the end of the war, Caesar bestowed upon Bocchus part of the territory of Masinissa II, Juba's ally, which was recovered by Massinissa's son Arabio after Caesar's murder. The kingdom of Mauretania thus extended to Ampsaga. The rest of the kingdom of Massinissa II, the region near the sea north of Cirta and the territory of Cirta, which had belonged to Juba, were given to Sittius.

=== Annexation of Western Mauretania and death ===
Dio Cassius says that Bocchus sent his sons to support Sextus Pompeius in Spain, while Bogud fought on the side of Caesar, and there is no doubt that after Caesar's death Bocchus supported Octavian, and Bogud Antony.

During Bogud's absence in Spain, Bocchus II seized the whole of Mauretania, and was confirmed sole ruler by Octavian. Thus Bocchus II reconstituted a unification of a larger Mauretanian kingdom than Bocchus I and Sosus had ever known. He died without heir in 33 BC, donating his kingdom to Augustus, who, after a brief period of direct administration (33 BC - 25 BC), gave it in 25 BC to Juba II, the son of Juba I and king of Numidia. Subsequently, Numidia (except of Western Numidia) was directly annexed to the Roman Empire as the part of the Roman province of Africa Proconsularis, whereas the kingdom of Mauretania (enlarged by Western Numidia) continued as a Roman client state under kings Juba II (25 BC – AD 23) and his son and successor Ptolemy of Mauretania (20 – 40) until it was annexed to the Roman Empire during the reign of Claudius.
