= Moulouya =

River in eastern Morocco

Moulouya River
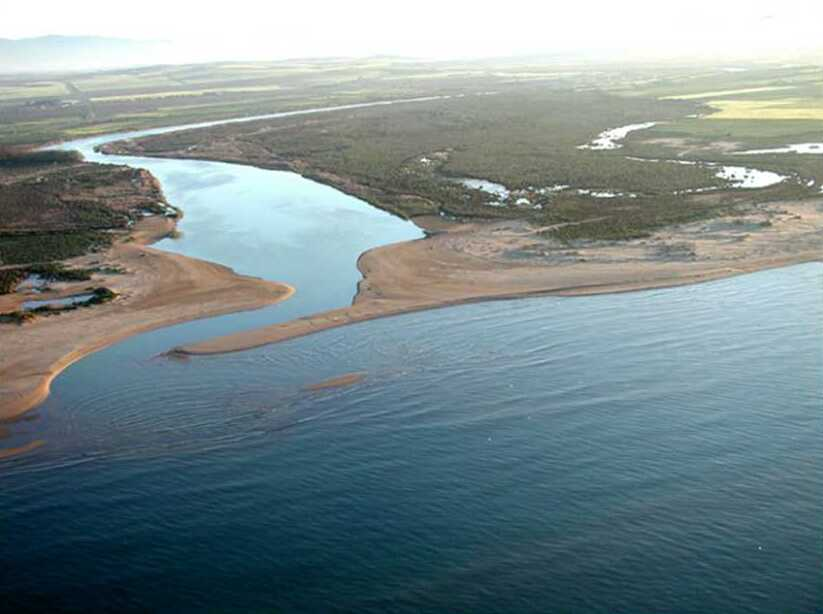
- View of the mouth of the Moulouya

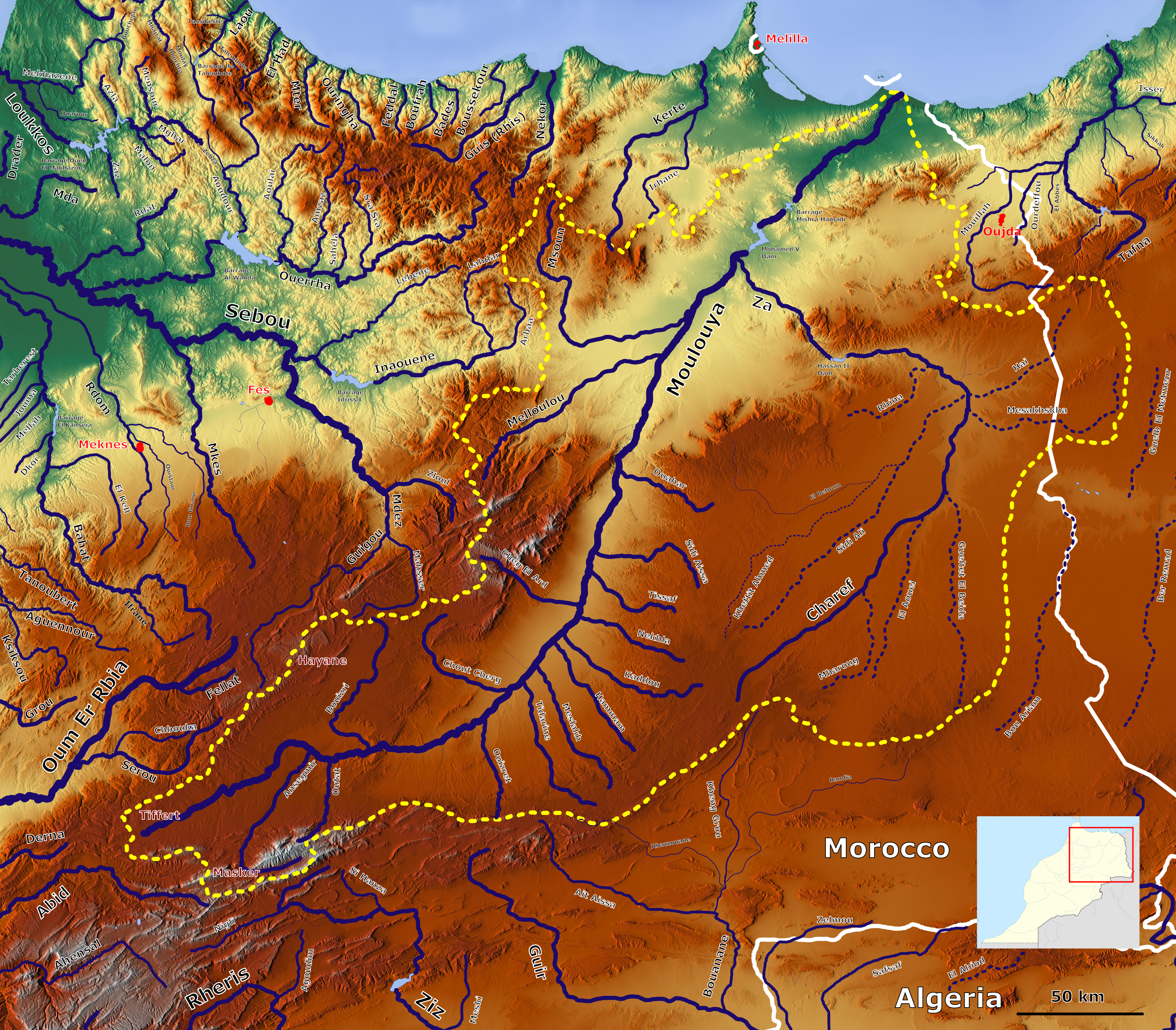
- The Moulouya River Bassin
- Native name: iɣẓer en Melwect (Berber languages); وادي ملوية (Arabic)

Location
- Country: Morocco

Physical characteristics
- Source
  - location: Jbel Ayachi
  - elevation: 3,700 m (12,100 ft)
- Mouth
  - location: Mediterranean Sea near Saïdia
  - coordinates: 35.1228°N 2.3367°W
  - elevation: 0 m (0 ft)
- Length: 520 km (323 mi)
- Discharge
  - average: varies

Basin features
- Progression: Middle Atlas - Hassan II Dam - Mohamed V Dam - Mediterranean Sea

Ramsar Wetland
- Official name: Embouchure de la Moulouya
- Designated: 15 January 2005
- Reference no.: 1478

The Moulouya River (Note: Tarifit: iɣẓer n melwect Arabic: وادي ملوية) is a 520 km-long (320 mi) river in Morocco. Its sources are located in the Ayashi mountain in the Middle Atlas. It empties into the Mediterranean Sea near Saïdia, in northeast Morocco.

Water level in the river often fluctuates. The river is used for irrigation and is dammed by the Hassan II and Mohamed V Dams.

== History ==
The river was historically known as Malva (Anglicized: Malve), Malua, Malvam, Mulva, Mulucha, or Molochath flumen, the names possibly related to the Semitic root melach or malach, meaning "salt". Maurice Besnier suggested that the lower parts of the river were used for salt production, but no material confirmation has been found.

From the end of the fourth to the beginning of the third centuries BC, the Mulucha formed the boundary between the Kingdom of the Mauri to the west and the Kingdom of the Masaesylli to the east. Mentioned as Mulucha by Titus Livius (also known as Livy).

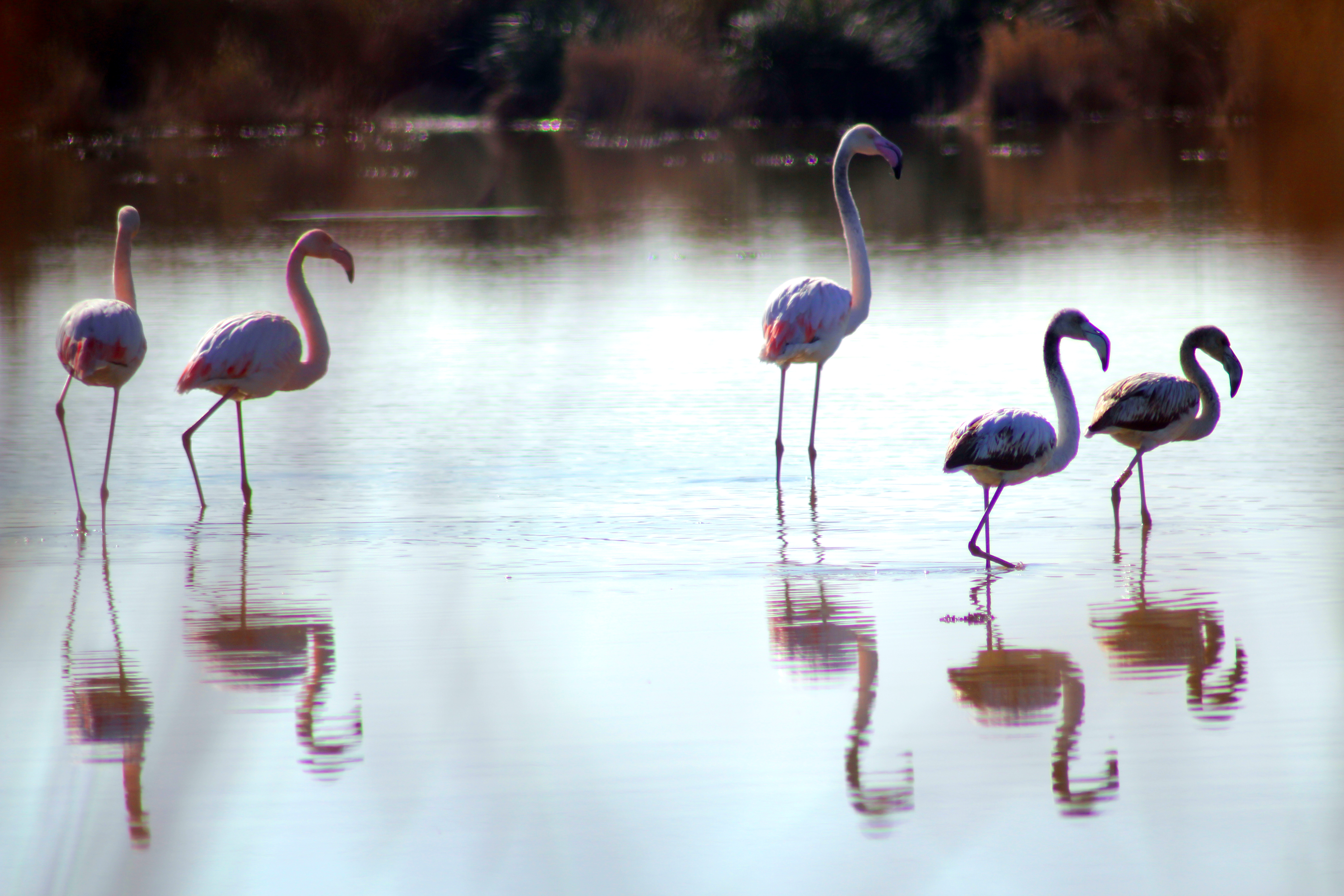
Flamingoes in the Moulouya.

In the Historia Brittonum (c. 828) it appears as the River Malvam, along the legendary route of the Scoti from Egypt to Hispania. In Geoffrey of Monmouth's Historia Regum Britanniae (c. 1136), Brutus of Troy follows a similar route from Leogecia, adding encounters with pirates, raids in Mauretania, and sirens at the Pillars of Hercules, passing the River Malvam before entering Mauretania.

The Moulouya River formed the eastern border of the Rif Republic in the 1920s, a small part of Morocco containing important cities like Saïdia and Oujda lying to the east, between the Moulouya and the border with Algeria. Until 1956 the river also formed the eastern border of the Spanish Protectorate of Morocco.

Before French colonisation, the Moulouya River was sometimes considered as the border between Regency of Algiers and the dynasties that controlled Morocco. A battle between the Algerians and the Alawites took place in 1692 at the ford of this river.

The illusionary Martian canals were given names of mythical and real rivers, including one named the "Malva" after the River Malvam.

== Ecology ==
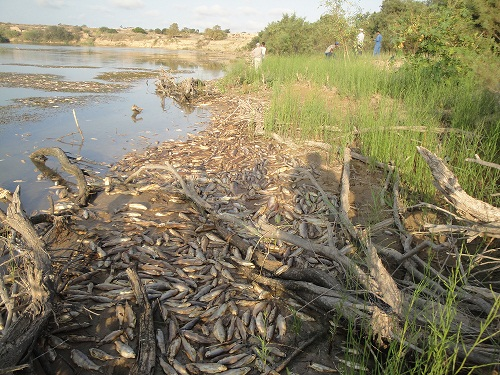
Fish killed by pollutants fill the Moulouya River in August 2011.

The Moulouya receives domestic wastewater from nearby populations and agricultural pollutants originating in the upper valley of its headwaters. In mid-2011, thousands of fish were found dead along the river, prompting environmental groups to blame pollution from the nearby Sucrafor sugar refinery, part of the Cosumar group, which had previously faced similar accusations in the 1980s and 1990s. The North Moroccan Green Platform reported black, foul-smelling water near Zaio, and farmers said livestock died after drinking from the river.

== Sources ==
- Trakadas, Athena (2016-01-22). "Oued Moulouya". Fish-Salting in the Northwest Maghreb in Antiquity: A Gazetteer of Sites and Resources. Archaeopress Publishing Ltd. ISBN 978-1-78491-242-0.
