= Gnaeus Domitius Ahenobarbus (died 81 BC) =

Gnaeus Domitius Ahenobarbus was a politician of ancient Rome in the 1st century BC. The son of Gnaeus Domitius Ahenobarbus, and brother of Lucius Domitius Ahenobarbus; his name in Latin means "brazen beard", from ahenus - "brazen, bronze-colored", and barbus, itself from barba, the Latin word for "beard". He married Cornelia, daughter of Lucius Cornelius Cinna, who was consul in 87 BC.

In the civil war between Marius and Sulla, Ahenobarbus took the side of the former. When Sulla obtained the supreme power in 82 BC, Ahenobarbus was proscribed, and fled to Africa, where he was joined by many who were in the same condition as himself. With the assistance of the Numidian king, Hiarbas, he collected an army, but was defeated in the Battle of Utica by Pompey, whom Sulla had sent against him, and was afterwards killed in the storming of his camp, in 81 BC. According to some accounts, he was executed after the battle on the orders of Pompey (who was probably acting on Sulla's orders himself).
