= Gauda (king) =

King of Numidia

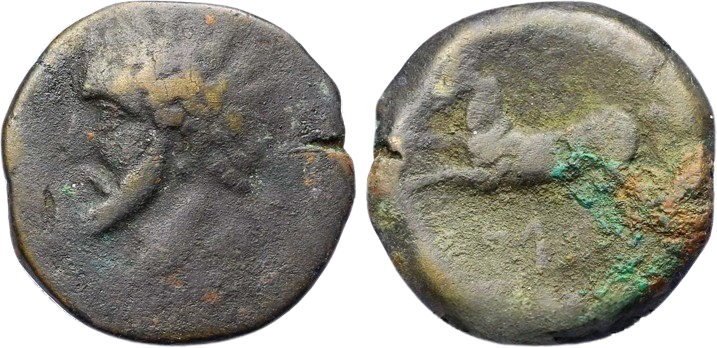
- Ancient coin of Gauda minted in Cirta.

King of Numidia
- Reign: c. 105 – c. 88 BCE
- Predecessor: Jugurtha
- Successor: Hiempsal II; Masteabar
- Died: 88 BC
- Issue: Hiempsal II; Masteabar; Adherbal
- Dynasty: Massylii
- Father: Mastanabal
- Mother: Unknown (Note: While he had the same father as Jugurtha, Gauda is mentionned as his half brother meaning that they didn’t have the same mother)

Gauda was a king of Numidia, who reigned from 105 BC to 88 BC. He was the son of Mastanabal and a grandson of Masinissa. Gauda was thus also a half-brother of Jugurtha. He was the father of Hiempsal II and the grandfather of Juba I.

According to Sallust during the Jugurthine War, Gauda had petitioned the Roman commander Q. Caecilius Metellus to allow him a seat, like a prince, next to himself, and a troop of horse for a bodyguard; but Metellus had refused both demands because such a seat was granted only to those whom the Roman people had addressed as kings, and the guard would be seen as an indignity to Romans. An offended Gauda then conspired with Gaius Marius to seek revenge for the affronts by blackening Metellus' reputation and having him stripped of his command and replaced with Marius.

Gauda became king of a much reduced Numidia after Jugurtha was defeated and captured by the Romans led by Gaius Marius.
