= Hiempsal II =

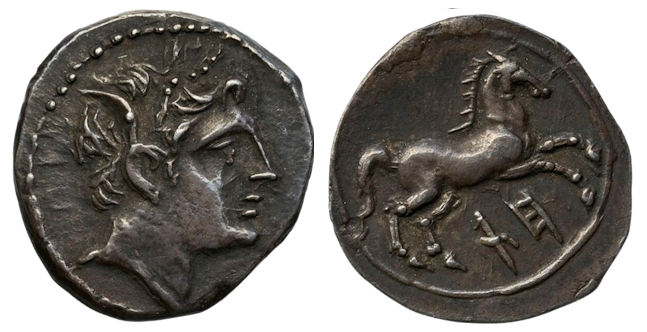
- Coin of Hiempsal II, on the obverse we can see the crowned bust of Hiempsal, on the reverse we can see a horse.

King of Numidia
- Reign: 88–81 BC (first time)
- Predecessor: Gauda
- Successor: Hiarbas II
- Reign: 79–60 BC (second time)
- Predecessor: Hiarbas II
- Successor: Juba I
- Died: c. 60 BC
- Issue: Juba I a daughter
- Dynasty: Massylii
- Father: Gauda

Hiempsal II was king of Numidia from 88 – 60 BC. He was the son of Gauda, half-brother of Jugurtha, and was the father of Juba I.

== History ==
In 88 BC, after the triumph of Lucius Cornelius Sulla, when Gaius Marius and his son fled from Rome to Africa, Hiempsal received them with apparent friendliness, his real intention being to detain them as prisoners. Marius discovered this intention in time and made good his escape with the assistance of the king's daughter.

In 81 BC, Hiempsal was driven from his throne by the Numidians themselves, or by Hiarbas, ruler of part of the kingdom, supported by Gnaeus Domitius Ahenobarbus, the leader of the Marian party in Africa. Soon afterwards Gnaeus Pompeius Magnus was sent to Africa by Sulla to reinstate Hiempsal, whose territory was subsequently increased by the addition of some land on the coast in accordance with a treaty concluded with Lucius Aurelius Cotta.

When the tribune Publius Servilius Rullus introduced his agrarian law (63 BC), these lands, which had been originally assigned to the Roman people by Publius Cornelius Scipio Africanus, were expressly exempted from sale, which roused the indignation of Marcus Tullius Cicero (De lege agraria, i. 4, ii. 22). From Suetonius (Caesar, 71) it is evident that Hiempsal was alive in 62 BC.

According to Sallust (Jugurtha, 17), he was the author of an historical work in the Punic language.
