= 46 BC =

46 BC in various calendars
- Gregorian calendar: 46 BC; XLVI BC
- Ab urbe condita: 708
- Ancient Egypt era: XXXIII dynasty, 278
- Pharaoh: Cleopatra VII, 6
- Ancient Greek Olympiad (summer): 183rd Olympiad, year 3
- Assyrian calendar: 4705
- Balinese saka calendar: N/A
- Bengali calendar: −639 – −638
- Berber calendar: 905
- Buddhist calendar: 499
- Burmese calendar: −683
- Byzantine calendar: 5463–5464
- Chinese calendar: 甲戌年 (Wood Dog); 2652 or 2445 — to — 乙亥年 (Wood Pig); 2653 or 2446
- Coptic calendar: −329 – −328
- Discordian calendar: 1121
- Ethiopian calendar: −53 – −52
- Hebrew calendar: 3715–3716
- Hindu calendars
- Vikram Samvat: 11–12
- Shaka Samvat: N/A
- Kali Yuga: 3055–3056
- Holocene calendar: 9955
- Iranian calendar: 667 BP – 666 BP
- Islamic calendar: 688 BH – 686 BH
- Javanese calendar: N/A
- Julian calendar: 46 BC; XLVI BC
- Korean calendar: 2288
- Minguo calendar: 1957 before ROC 民前1957年
- Nanakshahi calendar: −1513
- Seleucid era: 266/267 AG
- Thai solar calendar: 497–498
- Tibetan calendar: ཤིང་ཕོ་ཁྱི་ལོ་ (male Wood-Dog); 81 or −300 or −1072 — to — ཤིང་མོ་ཕག་ལོ་ (female Wood-Boar); 82 or −299 or −1071

Year 46 BC was the last year of the pre-Julian Roman calendar. At the time, it was known as the Year of the Consulship of Caesar and Lepidus (or, less frequently, year 708 Ab urbe condita). The denomination 46 BC for this year has been used since the early medieval period, when the Anno Domini calendar era became the prevalent method in Europe for naming years.

This year marks the change from the pre-Julian Roman calendar to the Julian calendar. The Romans had to periodically add a leap month every few years to keep the calendar year in sync with the solar year but had missed a few with the chaos of the civil wars of the late republic. Julius Caesar added Mercedonius (23 days) and two other intercalary months (33 and 34 days respectively) to the 355-day lunar year, to recalibrate the calendar in preparation for his calendar reform, which went into effect in 45 BC. The resulting calendar year, the longest calendar year in recorded history, lasted 445 days – nearly 80 days longer than the sidereal year (the orbit of Earth around the Sun) – and was nicknamed the annus confusionis ("Year of Confusion").

== Events ==
=== By place ===
==== Roman Republic ====
- Consuls: Gaius Julius Caesar, Marcus Aemilius Lepidus.
- Julius Caesar establishes Julia Paterna Arelate as a colony in Gaul for veterans of the Sixth Legion, at the present day site of Arles.
- Civil War:
  - January 4 – Titus Labienus fights Julius Caesar in the Battle of Ruspina.
  - April – Caesar defeats Pompey loyalists at Thapsus.
  - April 6 – Caesar defeats the combined army of Pompeian followers and Numidians under Metellus Scipio and Juba I of Numidia at Thapsus. After the battle Caesar grants Legio V Alaudae the right to bear the elephant symbol on its shields and standards, for bravery against a charge of elephants.
  - April 20 – Cicero, in Rome, writes to Varro "If our voices are no longer heard in the Senate and in the Forum, let us follow the example of the ancient sages and serve our country through our writings, concentrating on questions of ethics and constitutional law."
  - Caesar's erstwhile mistress, Queen Cleopatra VII of Egypt, and his son by her, Caesarion, take up residence in one of the dictator's estates on the Tiber.
  - September 26 – Julius Caesar dedicates a temple to his mythical ancestor Venus Genetrix in fulfillment of a vow he made at the battle of Pharsalus.
  - November – Caesar leaves for Hispania to deal with a fresh outbreak of resistance.
  - Caesar reforms the Roman calendar to create the Julian calendar. The transitional year is extended to 445 days to synchronize the new calendar and the seasonal cycle. The Julian Calendar would remain the standard in the western world for over 1600 years, until superseded by the Gregorian Calendar in 1582.
  - Caesar appoints his nephew Octavian his heir.
  - Caesar subdues a mutiny of his Tenth Legion.
  - Caesar celebrates his Gallic Triumph, after which Vercingetorix is executed. The celebrations run for forty days in Rome, and include public banquets, plays and gladiatorial games.

== Births ==
- Imhotep-Pedubast, High Priest of Ptah (d. 30 BC)
- Antipater, son of Herod the Great (d. 4 BC)
- Lucius Seius Strabo, Roman prefect of the Praetorian Guard (d. 16 AD)
- Publius Quinctilius Varus, Roman politician and general (d. 9 AD)

== Deaths ==
- April 12 - Marcus Porcius Cato (the Younger), Roman politician (b. 95 BC) (commits suicide)
- Faustus Cornelius Sulla, Roman politician and quaestor
- Juba I, king of Numidia (killed after the Battle of Thapsus)
- Saburra, General of Juba I (killed in battle by Publius Sittius)
- Lucius Afranius, Roman consul and governor (b. 112 BC)
- Lucius Manlius Torquatus, Roman politician and general
- Marcus Petreius, Roman politician and general (b. 110 BC) (commits suicide)
- Quintus Caecilius Metellus Scipio, Roman consul and general (commits suicide)
- Vercingetorix, Gaulish king and chieftain of the Arverni tribe (executed at the end of a triumph)
