= Saburra =

Numidian General

- Born: c. ? Numidia
- Died: 46 BC
- Cause of death: Killed in action
- Military career
- Allegiance: Juba I of Numidia
- Branch: Numidian army
- Rank: General
- Wars: Caesar's Civil War †; Battle of the Bagradas

Saburra was a Numidian general who served the king of Numidia, Juba I, and fought Julius Caesar during Caesar's Civil War. He managed to defeat one of Caesar's lieutenant, Gaius Scribonius Curio at the Battle of the Bagradas before eventually being killed in battle by a mercenary commander Publius Sittius, who was loyal to Caesar.

== Biography ==
Virtually nothing is known of Saburra's early life, and the only main source of information about him is from Caesar himself. We first hear of Saburra in 49 BC, where Caesar's civil war had recently broke out in that same year. Caesar had already conquered Italy and Spain from his ally turned rival Pompey the Great. Caesar wanted to control the three main grain hubs of the republic, Sardinia, Sicily, and Africa, so he dispatched two of his legates, 1 legion under Quintus Valerius Orca to Sardinia and another 2 under Gaius Scribonius Curio to Sicily. From there Curio would push into Africa to attack Pompey's governor of Africa, Publius Attius Varus. Upon news of Caesar's victory at the Battle of Ilerda, Curio crossed into Africa and defeated Varus at the Battle of Utica. Juba I of Numidia, meanwhile who had supported Varus with soldiers during the defeat at Utica began to assemble a large army that included Saburra, and marched towards Curio. Juba then pulled a clever trick, by spreading false rumors in Curio's camp that he had been forced to deal with a rebellion and had left the area, leaving only a small force led by Saburra. Curio, who was over confident following the victory at Utica, marched towards the Bagradas river and met the Numidian force commanded by Saburra, which was now reinforced by Juba's army and he used his Numidian light cavalry to skirmish and surround Curio's army at the Battle of the Bagradas. The Romans were defeated, Curio was killed, and the expedition failed.

Africa would remain in Pompeian hands until Caesar himself would arrive in 47 BC following defeating Pompey at the Battle of Pharsalus. Pompey would be assassinated in Egypt and once Caesar had settled affairs in the east he could now take the last bastion of resistance to his forces. Juba then answered a call to arms from Metellus Scipio and Cato the Younger, who were the leaders of the Pompeians faction against Caesar. However this would initially prove pointless as Gnaeus Pompey had wanted to prove himself and led a 2000 strong force against the kingdom of West Mauretania led by their king, Bogud. However the Mauretanians defeated the younger Pompey at the Battle of Ascurum. The defeat began to have great consequences for the Pompeians, as Bogud's brother the king of East Mauretania, Bocchus II dispatched an army against Numidia led by the Roman Mercenary Commander Publius Sittius. Sittius began raiding Numidian territory before capturing and sacking the Numidian capital of Cirta. Juba was forced to return to defend his kingdom. Juba would then leave Saburra in charge of a small army to defend Numidia from Sittius. Sittius once again invaded shortly after Juba left to join Scipio, and although little is known of Sittius's campaign, he defeated Saburra in a pitched battle, where he was killed.

Caesar would go onto to crush the Pompeians at the Battle of Thapsus. Juba, along with Marcus Petreius attempted to flee back to Numidia, however Sittius campaign convinced the locals the close the gates of Cirta to him. Juba and Petreius then decided upon fighting a duel, so one of them could be honorably killed. Juba won the duel killing Petreius, who then killed himself with the help of a slave.

== See also ==
- Battle of the Bagradas (49 BC)
- Juba I of Numidia
- Caesar's Civil War
- Julius Caesar

== Notes ==
- Holland, pp. 316–317
- Holland, pg. 318
- Holmes, pg. 104
- Holmes, pg. 105
- Holmes, pg. 106
- Holmes, pg. 107
- Roller, pg. 33
- Holmes, pg. 108
- Goldsworthy, pg. 23
- Roller, pg. 34

=== Citations ===
- Estarán Tolosa, María José (22 November 2016). Epigrafía bilingüe del Occidente romano: El latín y las lenguas locales en las inscripciones bilingües y mixtas. Prensas de la Universidad de Zaragoza. p. 486. ISBN 978-84-16515-63-9.
- Huss (1985), p. 568
- Mohand Akli, Haddadou. RECUEIL DE PRENOMS BERBERES (in French). Haut commissariat à l'amazighité. p. 41.
- Goldsworthy, Adrian (2006). "XXI". Caesar: Life of a Colossus. New Haven: Yale Press. p. 466.
- C. Michael Hogan (2008) Chilean Wine Palm: Jubaea chilensis, GlobalTwitcher.com, ed. Nicklas Stromberg Archived 2012-10-17 at the Wayback Machine
- Tucker, Spencer C. (16 February 2017). T he Roots and Consequences of Civil Wars and Revolutions: Conflicts that Changed World History. ABC-CLIO. p. 29. ISBN 9781440842948. Retrieved 22 August 2018.
- Gardner (translator), Jane F (1967). Julius Caesar – The Civil War. Penguin Books. p. 104.

=== Sources ===
- Julius Caesar, Commentarii de Bello Civili 2.40
- Cassius Dio's Roman History
- Suetonius, The Twelve Caesars - Caesar.
- Appian, B.C. i. 80.
- Marcus Velleius Paterculus ii. 54.
- Huss, Werner (1985), Geschichte der Karthager, Munich: C.H. Beck, ISBN 9783406306549. (in German)
- Goldsworthy, Adrian Keith, Caesar's Civil War, 49–44 BC, Osprey Publishing, 2002
- Holland, Tom, Rubicon: The Triumph and Tragedy of the Roman Republic, Abacus, 2004
- Holmes, T. Rice, The Roman Republic and the Founder of the Empire, Vol III, Oxford University Press, 1923
- Roller, Duane W., The World of Juba II and Kleopatra Selene: royal scholarship on Rome's African frontier, Taylor & *Francis e-Library, 2004
- Gardner, Jane F (translator), Julius Caesar – The Civil War Penguin Books 1967
