= 49 BC =

49 BC in various calendars
- Gregorian calendar: 49 BC; XLIX BC
- Ab urbe condita: 705
- Ancient Egypt era: XXXIII dynasty, 275
- Pharaoh: Cleopatra VII, 3
- Ancient Greek Olympiad (summer): 182nd Olympiad, year 4
- Assyrian calendar: 4702
- Balinese saka calendar: N/A
- Bengali calendar: −642 – −641
- Berber calendar: 902
- Buddhist calendar: 496
- Burmese calendar: −686
- Byzantine calendar: 5460–5461
- Chinese calendar: 辛未年 (Metal Goat); 2649 or 2442 — to — 壬申年 (Water Monkey); 2650 or 2443
- Coptic calendar: −332 – −331
- Discordian calendar: 1118
- Ethiopian calendar: −56 – −55
- Hebrew calendar: 3712–3713
- Hindu calendars
- Vikram Samvat: 8–9
- Shaka Samvat: N/A
- Kali Yuga: 3052–3053
- Holocene calendar: 9952
- Iranian calendar: 670 BP – 669 BP
- Islamic calendar: 691 BH – 690 BH
- Javanese calendar: N/A
- Julian calendar: N/A
- Korean calendar: 2285
- Minguo calendar: 1960 before ROC 民前1960年
- Nanakshahi calendar: −1516
- Seleucid era: 263/264 AG
- Thai solar calendar: 494–495
- Tibetan calendar: ལྕགས་མོ་ལུག་ལོ་ (female Iron-Sheep); 78 or −303 or −1075 — to — ཆུ་ཕོ་སྤྲེ་ལོ་ (male Water-Monkey); 79 or −302 or −1074

Year 49 BC was a year of the pre-Julian Roman calendar. At the time, it was known as the Year of the Consulship of Lentulus and Marcellus (or, less frequently, year 705 Ab urbe condita). The denomination 49 BC for this year has been used since the early medieval period, when the Anno Domini calendar era became the prevalent method in Europe for naming years.

== Events ==
=== By place and Date ===
==== Roman Republic ====
- Consuls: Lucius Cornelius Lentulus Crus, Gaius Claudius Marcellus.
- Caesar's Civil War commences:
  - January 1 – The Roman Senate receives a proposal from Julius Caesar that he and Pompey should lay down their commands simultaneously. The Senate responds that Caesar must immediately surrender his command.
  - January – Caesar leads his army across the Rubicon, which separates his jurisdiction in Cisalpine Gaul from that of the Senate in Rome, and thus initiates a civil war.
  - February – Pompey's flight to Epirus (in Western Greece) with most of the Senate.
  - March 9 – Caesar advances against Pompeian forces in Spain.
  - April 19 – Siege of Massilia: Caesar commences a siege at Massilia against the Pompeian Lucius Domitius Ahenobarbus. He leaves the newly raised legions XVII, XVIII and XIX to conduct the siege. Decimus Brutus – victor over the Veneti (see 56 BC) – is in charge of the fleet to blockade the harbor.
  - June – Caesar arrives in Spain; seizes the Pyrenees passes against the Pompeians L. Afranius and Marcus Petreius.
  - June 7 – Cicero slips out of Italy and goes to Thessaloniki.
  - July 30 – Caesar surrounds Afranius and Petreius's army in Ilerda.
  - August 2 – Pompeians in Ilerda surrender to Caesar and are granted pardon.
  - August 24 – Caesar's general Gaius Scribonius Curio is defeated in North Africa by the Pompeians under Attius Varus and King Juba I of Numidia (whom he defeated earlier in the Battle of Utica) in the Battle of the Bagradas, after which he commits suicide.
  - September – Brutus defeats the combined Pompeian-Massilian naval forces of the siege of Massilia, while the Caesarian fleet in the Adriatic Sea is defeated near Curicta (Krk).
  - September 6 – Massilia surrenders to Caesar, as he is coming back from Spain.
  - October – Caesar is appointed Dictator in Rome.

== Births ==
- Lucius Domitius Ahenobarbus, Roman consul (d. 25 AD)

== Deaths ==
- January 10 – Xuan of Han, emperor of the Han dynasty (b. 91 BC)
- Aristobulus II, king and high priest of Judea
- Gaius Memmius, Roman orator and poet (presumed).
- Gaius Scribonius Curio, Roman politician
- Jieyou, princess of the Han dynasty (b. 121 BC)
- Marcus Perperna, Roman politician
- Zheng Ji, general of the Han dynasty
