= Battle of Carteia (46 BC) =

Ancient Roman battle

- Part of Caesar's civil war
Date	46 BC
Location	Carteia
Result	Caesarian Victory

Belligerents
Caesarians	Pompeians

Commanders and leaders
Gaius Didius	Publius Attius Varus

Strength
Small fleet of Ships	Small fleet of Ships

Casualties and losses
Light	Light

The Battle of Carteia was a minor naval battle during the latter stages of Caesar's civil war won by the Caesarians led by Caesar's legate Gaius Didius against the Pompeians led by Publius Attius Varus.

== Background ==
Caesar's Civil War had begun in 49 BC due to the escalating tensions over the previous decade between Gaius Julius Caesar and the Roman Senate, who turned to his old ally Gnaeus Pompeius Magnus. Caesar famously crossed the Rubicon river in January, being labeled as "enemy of the people" by the senate. Caesar would go on to conquer Italy, Spain, Sardinia, and Sicily. Caesar would next invade Greece and although suffering a setback at Dyrrhachium, he eventually crushed Pompey at the Battle of Pharsalus. Pompey fled to Egypt, where he was assassinated by the Egyptians in an attempt to appease Caesar. Caesar then intervened in the Alexandrian Civil War to avenge Pompey as well as fighting the king of Pontus, Pharnaces II as well as performing other affairs in the east. Caesar would return to Italy and set upon conquering the last of Pompey's supporters in the province of Africa. Caesar would carry out his plan, succeeding in 46 BC when he crushed a Pompeian army at the Battle of Thapsus. Many Pompeian's were killed in the aftermath including Cato the Younger, Metellus Scipio, Lucius Afranius, Marcus Petreius, Faustus Cornelius Sulla, and the king of Numidia, Juba I. Others had fled to Hispania, modern day Spain to continue the fight including Gnaeus Pompeius Magnus, his brother Sextus, Titus Labienus, and the commander of the Pompeian fleet at Thapsus, Publius Attius Varus.

== Prelude ==
The Sons of Pompey, Labienus, and Varus then started a rebellion together with Veterans of the Battle of Ilerda and set upon taking and besieging several towns belong to the Caesarians. Caesar was in Rome, so two of his subordinates Quintus Fabius Maximus and Quintus Pedius were assigned to deal with the situation, however it was clear the situation was out of hand, and so awaited Caesar's arrival. Caesar immediately set to campaigning against the Pompeians.

Prior to the Battle of Munda, Publius Attius Varus had fled to the southern Spanish port of Carteia, taking the entire fleet of Thapsus with him. Meanwhile, Caesar's dispatched one his legates Gaius Didius with a small fleet from Sardania, and ordered him to travel to Hispania.

== Battle ==
Little is known or recorded about the actual battle itself, Didius arrived at Carteia and probably attempted to blockade the town rather than risk attacking the harbor of Carteia itself as such was folly during this era. Varus then responded by moving out of the harbor and engaging in combat, Didius. The Caesarians managed to gain the best of the fighting, destroying and capturing several Pompeians ships, and began to purse into the harbor, Cassius Dio states that the Pompeians ships were only able to escape due to Varus quick thinking by having anchors to be sunk side by side across the mouth of the harbor. The pursuing ships ran into these anchors, 'as on a reef', and had to abandon the pursuit.

== Aftermath ==
Varus would then join up with the rest of the Pompeians at Munda to meet Caesar. Despite fierce resistance the Pompeians were defeated by Caesar and both Labienus and Varus were killed. Gnaeus Pompey reached Carteia after the defeat at Munda, but was briefly captured by pro-Caesarians in the city, however the pro-pompeians then attacked and killed the leaders of pro-Caesarians and freed Gnaeus. This caused a fight between the two factions in which Gnaeus was wounded. He and his men then boarded 20 ships and although lacking supplies traveled along the coast north. However Didius, who had remained near by following the victory got wind of this and set to pursue, stationing sentries along the coast to watch for the fleet and keep eyes upon it. Gnaeus lacking supplies was forced to make landfall, while burning most of ships, the rest captured by Didius. Gnaeus Pompeius Magnus would eventually make his last stand against Lucius Caesennius Lento at the Battle of Lauro, in which he and most of his remaining supporters were killed. Sextus would Flee Corduba and become a pirate prior to the Bellum Siculum. Casear had won the civil war.

Didius was unable to enjoy his victory as following Gnaeus's death, he would be killed by the Lusitanians in an ambush shortly afterwards.
