= Battle of Hippo Regius =

Sea battle in 46 BC

- Part of Caesar's Civil War
Date	46 BC
Location	Off Hippo Regius, Africa, Roman Republic 36°52′57″N 07°45′00″E
Result	Caesarian victory

Belligerents
Populares; Eastern Mauritania	Optimates

Commanders and leaders
Publius Sittius	Metellus Scipio (executed); L. Manlius Torquatus †; Publius Damasippus †; Plaetorius Rustianus †

Casualties and losses
Low	Very High

The Battle of Hippo Regius was a naval encounter during Caesar's Civil War which occurred off the coast of the African city of Hippo Regius in 46 BC. Metellus Scipio and a number of influential senators from the Optimate faction were fleeing the disastrous Battle of Thapsus when their fleet was intercepted and destroyed by Publius Sittius, a mercenary commander in the employ of the Mauretanian king Bocchus, an ally of Gaius Julius Caesar's. Scipio committed suicide and all of the other senators were killed during the battle.

== Background ==
Escalating tensions over the previous decade between Gaius Julius Caesar and the Roman Senate, rallying around Gnaeus Pompeius Magnus ("Pompey the Great"), culminated in Caesar crossing the Rubicon river in January 49 BC and thus being labelled as an enemy of the people. With civil war ignited Caesar quickly gained control of the Italian Peninsula before eventually pursuing Pompey to Greece and defeating him in the Battle of Pharsalus. Pompey was assassinated as he attempted to flee to Ptolemaic Egypt precipitating Caesar's intervention in an ongoing civil war. After a year spent in Alexandria, Caesar began to coordinate his efforts against the remaining Optimate forces concentrated in the north of Africa.

After landing in Africa, the Optimates gathered to confront Caesar as he besieged the city of Thapsus. The force arrayed against Caesar was commanded primarily by Metellus Scipio, who had taken this eminent position following the death of Pompey the Great. The ensuing battle was a disaster for Scipio and his numerically superior army was completely routed by Caesar.

== Prelude ==
Publius Sittius became a mercenary in Northern Africa after being implicated in the Second Catilinarian Conspiracy of 63 BC. He had become involved in the civil war while in the employ of Bocchus II of eastern Mauretania together they had organised an invasion into the lands of Massinissa II and quickly captured his kingdom. This kingdom was an ally of Juba I of Numidia who was in turn an ally of Scipio. At this time Juba was moving to rendezvous with Scipio and confront Caesar at Thapsus but upon learning that Sittius' was moving against Massinissa's capital of Cirta the king was compelled to return and defend his own kingdom thus allowing Caesar more time to prepare and lending to his upcoming victory. Sittius continued to win victories over Juba, and his subordinate Saburra after the king returned east, independently of Bocchus.

Despite playing such a key role in the civil war by ensuring that Scipio and Juba were unable to concentrate their forces at the opportune moment, the degree of coordination that existed between Sittius and Caesar is unclear. Cassius Dio states that, in at least the early stages of his campaign, Sittius owed no loyalty to Caesar and that the latter had no knowledge of the former.

Following Caesar's victory at the Battle of Thapsus, Sittius managed to capture the retreating Optimate commanders Lucius Afranius and Faustus Cornelius Sulla after thoroughly defeating their 1000 strong cavalry force. These men were then either sent along to Caesar where they were either promptly executed at the demands of his men or murdered in Sittius' captivity by mutinous men.

Many of the Optimate commanders who survived the Battle of Thapsus, including Caesar's one time lieutenant Titus Labienus, managed to successfully flee from the scene and headed towards Hispania to regroup. Scipio boarded a ship with a number of prominent men and attempted to do the same. Among those present with Scipio as he set sail were the senators Lucius Manlius Torquatus, Publius Damasippus and Plaetorius Rustianus.

== Battle ==
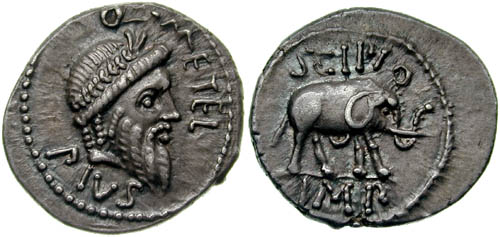
Denarius issued by Metellus Scipio while Imperator in Africa.

Scipio's fleet was sailing west when a strong headwind forced them to attempt to make port at the city of Hippo Regius on the north African coast. It was here that Sittius' now large mercenary fleet chanced upon them and chose to attack. The larger and more numerous ships under the command of Sittius swiftly surrounded their much smaller counterparts and in the resulting battle all of the senators perished. Upon being confronted by Sittius' men, and the outcome of the battle becoming clear, Scipio took his own life with his sword so as to avoid falling into enemy hands. His final words are said to have been Imperator se bene habet ("Your general is just fine").

== Aftermath ==
The loss of so many notable senatorial supporters was a further blow to the Optimate cause following the devastating defeat at Thapsus. Cato the Younger, another very prominent leader of the faction, had also committed suicide at Utica around this time. The remaining Optimate forces regrouped in Hispania under the leadership of Titus Labienus, Publius Attius Varus, Gnaeus Pompeius ("Pompey the Younger") and Sextus Pompeius where they would face eventual defeat to Caesar at the Battle of Munda effectively bringing an end to the civil war.

Scipio's dignity in death was greatly admired by many including the Stoic philosopher Seneca the Younger who likened Scipio's decision to "conquer death" to the conquests of his famous ancestor Scipio Africanus against Carthage in the Punic Wars.

The lands in eastern Numidia conquered by Sittius were reorganised by Caesar into the new province of Africa Nova. For his part in the civil war, Sittius was rewarded by Caesar with control of a semi-autonomous region within the new province called the Confederatio Cirtense as part of his veteran resettlement programme and the first romanisation efforts in Africa. Sittius succeeded in settling the area with 5000 legionaries primarily from Campania who were split between the cities of Cirta, Milevum, Chullu and Rusicade. Within 20 years over 20,000 people had migrated from Italy and colonised the area. The settlement was later referred to as Cirta Sittianorum and the legionaries who controlled the region came to be known as "Sittians" (Sittiani).
