= Numidian army =

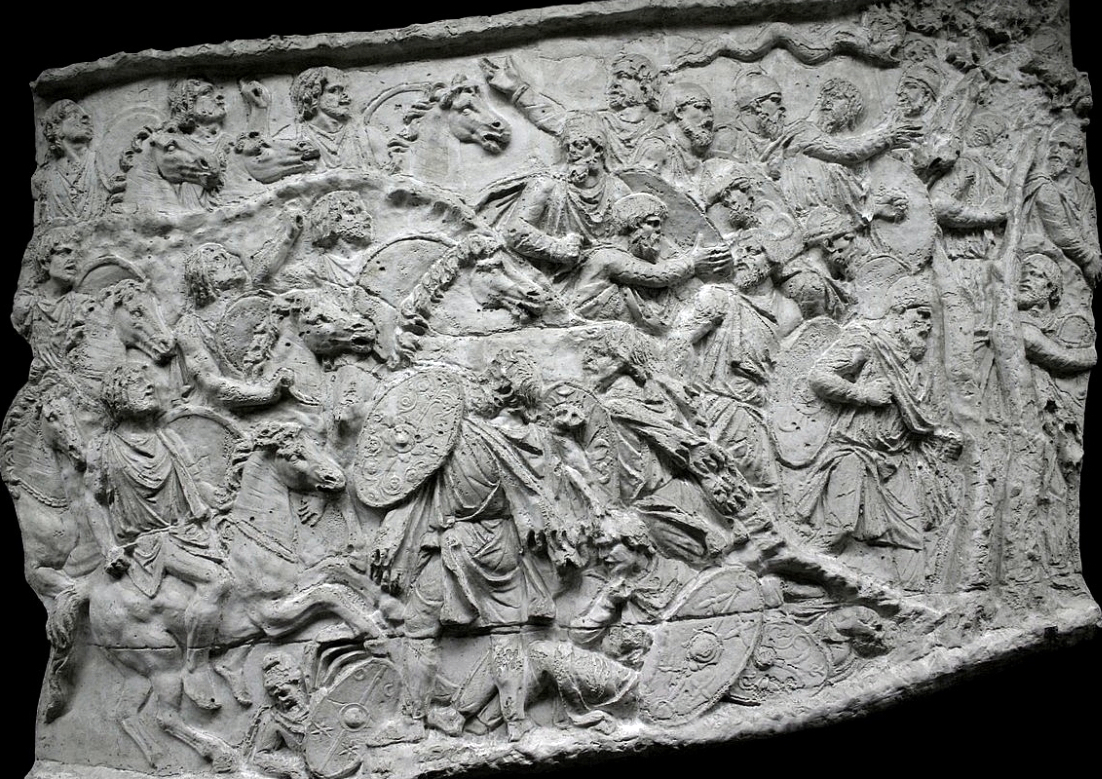
- Numidian cavalry from Trajan’s Column, on display at the Museum of Roman Civilization in Rome.
- Active: 1274 BC–46 BC (1,228 years)
- Country: Ancient Numidia; Kingdom of Massylii; Kingdom of Masaesyli; Kingdom of Numidia
- Headquarters: Hippo Regius; Cirta; Siga; Zama Regia
- Engagements: Punic Wars; Jugurthine War; Battle of Kadesh; Numidian–Carthaginian War; Mercenary War; Second Punic War; Sicilian Wars; Caesar's Civil War; Numantine War

Commanders
- Commander-in-chief: King. Prince. General (1274 BC–46 BC)
- Notable commanders: Meryey; Iarbas; Aylimas; Naravas; Maharbal; Syphax; Masinissa; Jugurtha; Juba I Gulussa; Bomilcar; Saburra

The Numidian army was the military force established by the Kings of Numidia in North Africa during the Ancient ages, and it was a major power in the Mediterranean. The name of the Numidians emerged in warfare as early as 1274 BC during the Battle of Kadesh, where Numidian cavalry fought as allies of the Egyptian Pharaoh Ramesses II against the Hittites. The second mention of the Numidians, according to Ovid Fasti and Virgil in his epic The Aeneid, comes during the reign of King Iarbas I in the 9th or 8th century BC, when he launched a military campaign against Carthage and laid siege to it. The Numidian Army ruled North Africa from the Atlantic Ocean to Cyrenaica on the borders of the Ptolemaic Kingdom.

== Organization ==
The command structure of the Numidian army was characterized by its adherence to a strict military hierarchy stemming from a top-down pyramidal organization; military directives and orders flowed from the apex of the command pyramid to its base, forming the fundamental pillar that guaranteed organizational discipline and operational effectiveness within the army, It is structured into 6 official ranks:

=== King ===
King (Agellid) occupied the apex of the Numidian army's command hierarchy, serving as chief of staff and commander-in-chief of the armed forces. Numidian monarchs, such as Syphax, Masinissa, Jugurtha, and Juba I, were characterized by their direct supervision of military operations and on-field battle leadership.

Historical sources, particularly the African War (Bellum Africum), indicate that King Juba I wore a purple cloak on the battlefield as a sign of absolute leadership. When he saw Metellus Scipio wearing a purple cloak, he ordered him to remove it immediately and replace it with a white one out of respect for the sovereignty of the King of Numidia; Scipio complied with the orders immediately. This purple cloak worn by senior officers, fastened on the right shoulder with a special buckle, constituted the distinctive mark of supreme command.

=== General ===
Military tradition dictated the permanent royal leadership of the armies. Numidian policy excepted certain specific cases; monarchs resorted to delegating supreme command to an elite group of close generals, or wealthy, socially influential figures. This organizational behavior is evident in King Juba I entrusting the supreme command of the army to General Saburra to confront the Roman general Curio and killed him in the battle of Bagradas.

=== Officer ===
The rank of officer with the grade of legate deputy came directly next in command after the King. These officers possessed the authority to deputy for the King in general command when he was occupied with political affairs, or as a strategic measure to ensure the stability of the military administration and prevent the confusion of the troops in the event that the King was captured.

The military officer elite stationed in the capital, Cirta, and its neighboring cities formed the essential backbone of the regular royal army. This army was established by King Masinissa as a tool to align the military institution with the sociological structure; thus, it became the central core around which tribal military units were mobilized to serve the throne during wartime.

In this context, Stéphane Gsell indicates that the Numidian regular forces were organized into military corps overseen by professional officers with extensive warfare experience. These commanders were known in Latin sources by the term (Praefecti equitatus) or (equitum praefecti) a rank that reflects their vast field experience and high capability to maintain troop discipline and enforce administrative and military order.

=== Centurion ===
This officer was responsible for leading a division consisting of 100 soldiers. this rank was designated by the title (RBTMT).

=== Pentecostarch ===
This commander was in charge of a detachment comprising 50 soldiers. Known by the title (AHDMS).

=== Private ===
The Private or Common Soldier, this category represents the rank-and-file soldier who held no military title or command responsibilities within the Numidian army. Serving exclusively as a combatant under the authority of the higher command, this soldier could be deployed within either the infantry or the cavalry. In the Libyc Numidian language, this rank was recorded in the form (MSWH).

== Numidian war elephant ==
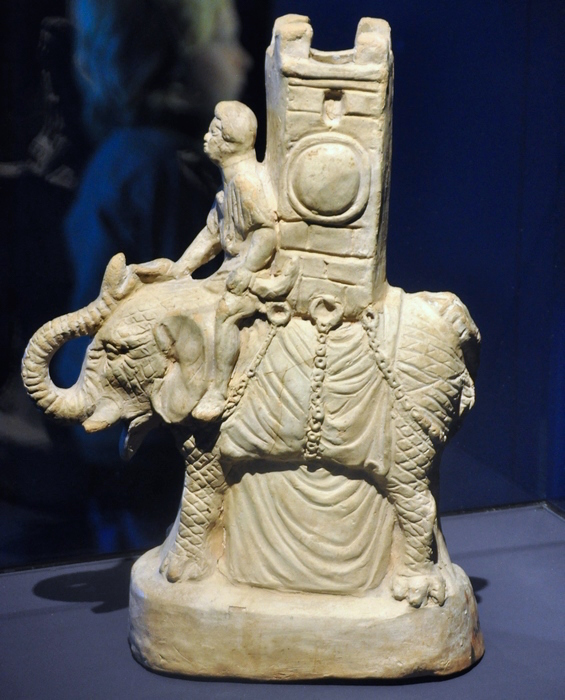
Statuette of a war elephant from Pompeii, illustrating ancient military use of elephants.

The Numidian army was renowned for its use of war elephants, as Numidia was the primary supplier of elephants to Rome. During the Battle of the Muthul in 109 BC, the Numidians, under Jugurtha, utilized 44 war elephants, whose command was handed over to General Bomilcar, who was ordered to open a second battle front on the other bank of the river to cut off the water supply to the Roman army encamped there. While Sallust did not specify the physical characteristics or type of these elephants mentioning only their role as a shock weapon, he noted that the Numidians employed specific strategies: extending their military lines to close off the passes, preventing the secondary forces from reinforcing the main army, and deploying the elephants to destabilize the enemy's ranks.

According to Michael B. Charles, historical evidence confirms the superiority of Numidian bush elephants (Loxodonta africana) in size and physical capability compared to their Indian counterparts. When at a battle-ready age, these giant mammals are at least as large as Indian elephants, while the males can grow significantly larger and more massive. This structural superiority corroborates the account in the historical treatise The African War (Bellum Africanum), which documents the Roman General Metellus Scipio’s use of Numidian elephants in his battles. These elephants were large and strong enough to carry combat turrets on their backs, thereby reinforcing the accuracy of classical reports regarding the exceptional military efficiency of Numidian elephants in antiquity.

Furthermore, Numidia was home to another distinct type, The African forest elephant (Loxodonta africana cyclotis), which reaches a height of 2.45 meters at the shoulder and was strong enough to carry the weight of towers, crews, and armor. The elephants of King Juba I were equipped with towers and armor. He commanded an army of 60 war elephants at the Battle of the Bagradas River where he defeated Julius Caesar’s forces. This elite unit remained in service with the same number until the Battle of Thapsus.

== Numidian war chariot ==
Diodorus Siculus mentions that the Numidian King Ailymas allied with Agathocles of Syracuse during the Sicilian Wars, the Numidian participation consisted of 50 war chariots, along with a group of cavalry and infantry. The ancient Greeks utilized the skills of the Numidians in chariot driving; much of this mobility stemmed from the war chariots, which were deployed much like the Numidians used their cavalry alongside the infantry, Typically each chariot carried both a warrior and a driver, the warrior would engage in combat on foot, while it was the driver’s duty to keep the chariot as close to him as his own skill permitted.

G. Charles Picard identified another type of Numidian chariot, the desert chariot prevalent south of Numidia. These chariots are characterized by a low platform mounted directly onto the axle, restricting their capacity to a single driver wielding a short whip instead of a weapon. They were drawn by Barbary breed horses, harnessed using a neck collar rather than a yoke. The horses are depicted in the "flying gallop" pose a posture uncommon for war chariots in Aegean documentation that these vehicles were not intended for combat, but were rather used for ceremonial or sporting purposes. Herodotus also mentioned that the Garamantes used them to presue the Ethiopian troglodytes.

War chariots were common in North Africa and were utilized by Numidians, Over time, they were replaced by cavalry for military purposes; the last recorded use of chariots was with the allies of Agathocles in 307 BC, the use of chariots may have persisted until the 1st century BC, according to Strabo.

== The Numidian Army's Role in Warfare ==
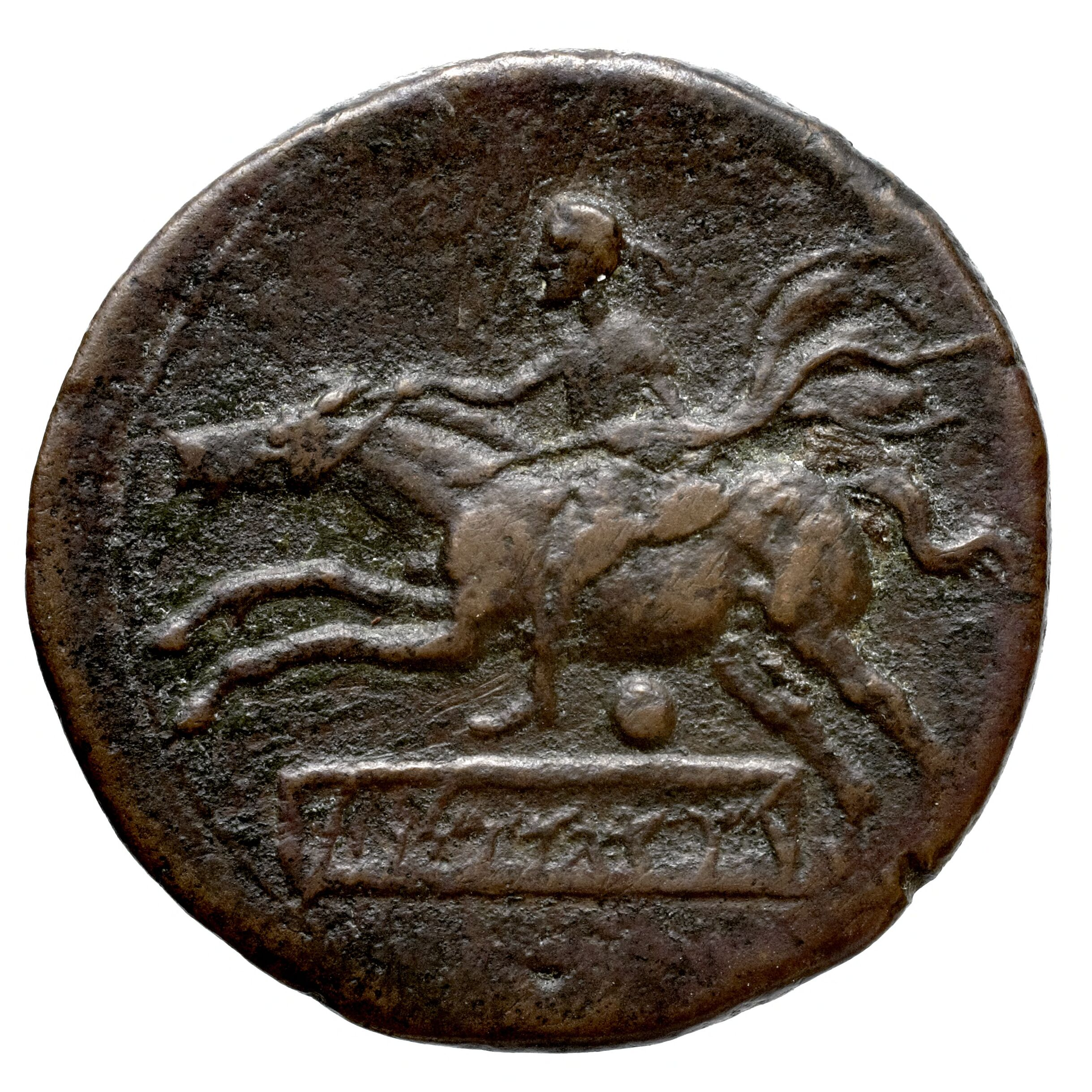
Depiction of Syphax (Scefax), King of the Masaesyli (Western Numidia, c. 238–202 BC). This coin illustrates symbols associated with his reign.

The Numidian armies played a decisive role in the Punic Wars, particularly the Numidian cavalry under the command of the Numidian leader Maharbal, whom the Carthaginian general Mago Barca considered the strongest element in Hannibal’s army during his campaign in Italy. The Numidian army reached its peak under King Masinissa after defeating Syphax and uniting Numidia, forming a massive and well-organized force that he led in the Numidian–Carthaginian Wars (201–146 BC).

== See also ==
- Ancient Numidia
- Massylii
- Masaesyli
- Iarbas
- Jugurthine War
- Punic Wars
- Jugurtha
- Numidans
