= Petreia gens =

Ancient Roman family

The gens Petreia was a minor plebeian family at ancient Rome. Members of this gens are first mentioned toward the end of the second century BC, and several were distinguished as soldiers, but none of them ever attained the consulship.

== Origin ==
The nomen Petreius belongs to a large class of gentilicia ending in -eius, many of which were Oscan or Umbrian, and derived from place names and cognomina originally ending in -as or -aes. However, in this instance it seems more likely that Petreius is a patronymic surname, derived from the Oscan praenomen Petrus or Petro. Since the first of the Petreii mentioned came from Atina, in Samnium, it seems likely that the family was of Samnite origin.

== Praenomina ==
The only praenomina used by the Petreii appearing in history are Gnaeus and Marcus. In inscriptions, Marcus, Gaius, Lucius, and Quintus are regularly found, while other names are hardly used.

== Branches and cognomina ==
None of the Petreii mentioned under the Republic bore any surname. Numerous cognomina appear in inscriptions, most of which are from imperial times, but none of them seem to represent distinct families.

== Members ==
This list includes abbreviated praenomina. For an explanation of this practice, see filiation.

- Gnaeus Petreius, a native of Atina, was a senior centurion serving in the army of the consul Quintus Lutatius Catulus during the Cimbrian War in 102 BC. He was decorated with the Grass Crown, the highest honor able to be bestowed upon a Roman soldier, for his skill and bravery, which saved his legion from destruction.
- Marcus Petreius, praetor in an uncertain year, commanded the Republican forces during the decisive battle against Catiline in 62 BC. He was legate under Pompeius in Hispania from 55 until defeated and captured by Caesar during the Civil War. He fought in the subsequent campaigns until after the Battle of Thapsus, when he and Juba slew one another.
- Marcus Petreius, a centurion who served under Caesar during the Gallic Wars. He was slain in battle at Gergovia in 52 BC.
- (Marcus) Petreius M. f., son of Marcus Petreius, the legate of Pompeius, is reported by Orosius to have been captured after the Battle of Thapsus, and put to death at Caesar's orders; however, Orosius wrongly ascribes a similar fate to the family of Faustus Cornelius Sulla, so this account of Petreius' fate is highly suspect.

=== Petreii from inscriptions ===
- Petreia, buried at Milevum in Numidia, aged twenty-five.
- Petreia Hospitis f., buried at Castellum Tidditanorum in Numidia, aged twenty-five.
- Quintus Petreius, named in an inscription from Nemus Dianae in Latium.
- Petreia Bonifatia, buried at the present site of Borj El Amri, formerly in Africa Proconsularis, aged sixty-five.
- Marcus Petreius S. f. Callisto, buried at Rome, in a tomb dating to the first century AD, aged fifteen years, thirty-five days.
- Petreia C. f. Celerina, the sister of Gaius Petreius Rufinus, together with whom she dedicated a monument to their mother, Floria Rufina, at Terventum in Samnium.
- Petreia M. f. Clara(?), wife of Marcus Asinius Triarius, buried at Nertobriga Concordia Julia in Hispania Baetica.
- Petreia C. f. Faustina, buried at Sicca Veneria in Africa Proconsularis, aged thirty-nine.
- Petreia Extricata, buried at Castellum Elefantum in Numidia, aged eighty.
- Petreia Felicitas, buried at Carthage in Africa Proconsularis, aged thirty eight years, ten months, and twelve days.
- Lucius Petreius L. l. Felix, a freedman named in an inscription from Brixia.
- Gaius Petreius Fortunatus, buried at Mustis in Africa Proconsularis, aged seventy-one.
- Lucius Petreius Gentianus, buried at Rome with a monument from his brother, Lucius Petreius Saturninus.
- Petreia Iacchi f. Helis Maxima, buried near the present site of Zahlé, formerly in Syria, aged twenty-five.
- Petreia Januaria, buried at Castellum Elefantum, aged ninety.
- Petreia P. f. Januaria, buried at Mustis, aged seventy-five.
- Petreia Kasta, buried at Castellum Elefantum, aged ninety-five.
- Petreia Laeta, buried at Castellum Elefantum, aged ninety-five.
- Petreia Marcella, dedicated a monument to her husband, Martialis Cobelcus, at Emerita in Lusitania.
- Petreia Marisa, buried at Castellum Elefantum, aged one hundred and five.
- Marcus Petreius L. f. Mustulus, buried at Mustis, aged, forty-eight.
- Lucius Petreius L. f. Octavianus, buried at Mustis, aged eighty-five.
- Petreia Paula, buried at Castellum Tidditanorum, aged one hundred and five.
- Petreia M. l. Prota, a freedwoman buried at Rome.
- Quintus Petreius Quietus, buried at Castellum Celtianum in Numidia, aged fifty-five.
- Gaius Petreius C. f. Rufinus, together with his sister, Petreia Celerina, dedicated a monument to their mother, Floria Rufina at Terventum.
- Petreia Rustica, buried at Castellum Elefantum, aged ninety-five.
- Lucius Petreius Saturninus, built a monument at Rome for his brother, Lucius Petreius Gentianus.
- Gaius Petreius Sodalis, buried at Castellum Elefantum, aged seventy.
- Quintus Petreius Q. l. Stabilio, a freedman buried at Venusia in Samnium.
- Marcus Petreius Statius, named in an inscription from Rome.
- Quintus Petreius Q. l. Strenuus, a freedman buried at Venusia, aged twenty.
- Petreia Turpa, a freedwoman buried at Aesernia in Samnium.
- Lucius Petreius Victor, named in a libationary inscription found near the present site of Mataró, formerly part of Hispania Tarraconensis.
- Marcus Petreius Victor, buried at Castellum Tidditanorum in Numidia, aged fourteen.

== See also ==
- List of Roman gentes

== Bibliography ==
- Marcus Tullius Cicero, Epistulae ad Atticum, Pro Sestio.
- Gaius Julius Caesar, Commentarii de Bello Gallico (Commentaries on the Gallic War), Commentarii de Bello Civili (Commentaries on the Civil War).
- Aulus Hirtius (attributed), De Bello Africo (On the African War).
- Gaius Sallustius Crispus (Sallust), Bellum Catilinae (The Conspiracy of Catiline).
- Titus Livius (Livy), History of Rome.
- Marcus Velleius Paterculus, Compendium of Roman History.
- Marcus Annaeus Lucanus (Lucan), Pharsalia.
- Gaius Plinius Secundus (Pliny the Elder), Historia Naturalis (Natural History).
- Gaius Suetonius Tranquillus, De Vita Caesarum (Lives of the Caesars, or The Twelve Caesars).
- Appianus Alexandrinus (Appian), Bellum Civile (The Civil War).
- Lucius Cassius Dio Cocceianus (Cassius Dio), Roman History.
- Paulus Orosius, Historiarum Adversum Paganos (History Against the Pagans).
- Dictionary of Greek and Roman Biography and Mythology, William Smith, ed., Little, Brown and Company, Boston (1849).
- Theodor Mommsen et alii, Corpus Inscriptionum Latinarum (The Body of Latin Inscriptions, abbreviated CIL), Berlin-Brandenburgische Akademie der Wissenschaften (1853–present).
- Bulletin Archéologique du Comité des Travaux Historiques et Scientifiques (Archaeological Bulletin of the Committee on Historic and Scientific Works, abbreviated BCTH), Imprimerie Nationale, Paris (1885–1973).
- René Cagnat et alii, L'Année épigraphique (The Year in Epigraphy, abbreviated AE), Presses Universitaires de France (1888–present).
- August Pauly, Georg Wissowa, et alii, Realencyclopädie der Classischen Altertumswissenschaft (Scientific Encyclopedia of the Knowledge of Classical Antiquities, abbreviated RE or PW), J. B. Metzler, Stuttgart (1894–1980).
- George Davis Chase, "The Origin of Roman Praenomina", in Harvard Studies in Classical Philology, vol. VIII (1897).
- Stéphane Gsell, Inscriptions Latines de L'Algérie (Latin Inscriptions from Algeria, abbreviated ILAlg), Edouard Champion, Paris (1922–present).
- Inscriptions grecques et latines de la Syrie (Greek and Latin Inscriptions of Syria, abbreviated IGLS), Paris (1929–present).
- T. Robert S. Broughton, The Magistrates of the Roman Republic, American Philological Association (1952–1986).
