= Lucius Manlius Torquatus (praetor 49 BC) =

Roman general and consul (died 46 BC)

Praetor
- In office January – December 49 BC

Propraetor
- In office January 48 – April 46 BC

Personal details
- Born: Unknown
- Died: 46 BC Hippo Regius, Africa
- Occupation: Politician, general

Military service
- Allegiance: Roman Republic
- Battles/wars: Caesar's Civil War: Oricum; Dyrrhachium; Thapsus; Hippo Regius †

Lucius Manlius Torquatus (died 46 BC) was a Roman politician and military commander. He was active during the Crisis of the Roman Republic and Caesar's Civil War. He commanded troops at the battles of Oricum, Dyrrhachium and Thapsus. The last of these ended the war, in a defeat for the faction Torquatus supported; he escaped the field, but was captured and killed shortly after. He is portrayed by Cicero in De Finibus as a spokesman advocating Epicurean ethics.

== Biography ==
=== Early life ===
Torquatus was the son of Lucius Manlius Torquatus, and belonged to the patrician Manlia gens, one of the oldest Roman houses. In 69 BC he was elected a member of the Quindecimviri sacris faciundis, a senior religious collegium. In 66 BC he was the first to accuse newly elected consuls Publius Cornelius Sulla and Publius Autronius Paetus, the consul designates for the following year, of bribery in connection with the elections, thereby securing the election of his father in 65.

Torquatus was closely aligned with Cicero, both strong supporters of the self described boni (good men). The boni were the traditionalist senatorial majority of the Roman Republic, politicians who believed that the role of the Senate was being usurped by the legislative people's assemblies for the benefit of a few power hungry individuals. The boni were against anyone who attempted to use these legislative assemblies to reform the state. As a fellow senator Torquatus supported Cicero during his praetorship in 66 BC and his tumultuous consulship in 63. After Cicero had beaten him to the consulship, the distinguished ex-general and military governor Lucius Sergius Catilina led a conspiracy centered on assassinating Cicero and overthrowing the Republic with the help of foreign armed forces. Three years earlier, Torquatus' father and Cicero had publicly supported Catilina when he was unsuccessfully prosecuted for corruption and abuse of office. Despite this, Torquatus vigorously supported the Senate's efforts, which resulted in them unmasking the conspirators, capturing and executing several. The following year Catilina, with what was left of his army, was cornered by three legions and killed.

By this time, Torquatus and Cicero were on opposite sides. Torquatus accused Publius Cornelius Sulla of being a part of Catilina's conspiracies. Sulla had been an enemy for the four years since Torquatus had accused him of bribery, resulting in his being tried, convicted and, under the Lex Acilia Calpurnia, deprived of the consulship, being replaced by Torquatus' father, and expelled from the Senate. Torquatus prosecuted Sulla for plotting the revenge killing of his father, while Cicero defended the accused. Torquatus accused Sulla of raising a force of armed men in 66 to secure the consulship for Catilina and murder the ruling consuls Lucius Manlius Torquatus, Torquatus' father, and Lucius Aurelius Cotta. He also accused Cicero of manufacturing evidence. This was the occasion for Cicero delivering his Pro Sulla speech. Sulla was acquitted, almost certainly due to Cicero's oratory skills. Sulla's cousins, Publius and Servius, were not so fortunate, as Cicero refused to consider defending them.

=== Military career ===
In 50 the Senate, led by Pompey, ordered populist politician and general Julius Caesar to disband his army and return to Rome because his term as governor had ended. Caesar thought he would be prosecuted if he entered Rome without the immunity enjoyed by a magistrate. Torquatus was elected praetor (commander of a field army) for 49 and given command of six cohorts. On 10 January 49 Caesar crossed the Rubicon river, the boundary of Italy, and ignited Caesar's Civil War. He marched rapidly on Rome and captured it. Pompey, the boni and most of the Senate fled to Greece. Torquatus' soldiers went over to Caesar, but he decided to oppose Caesar and joined Pompey. The following year was appointed propraetor (military governor).

Pompey put him in charge of the defence of Oricum. In January 48 Caesar landed nearby with six legions and marched on the port, which he urgently needed in order to supply his troops and to land reinforcements. Torquatus manned the walls with locally raised Illyrian soldiers and the town's Greek civilians. The locals and the garrison, afraid of the legions, opened the town's gate and allowed Caesar entry. Two of Pompey's lieutenants who were guarding merchant ships loaded with grain for Pompey's troops sank them with their warships to prevent them from falling into Caesar's hands. Torquatus surrendered to Caesar, who released him unharmed.

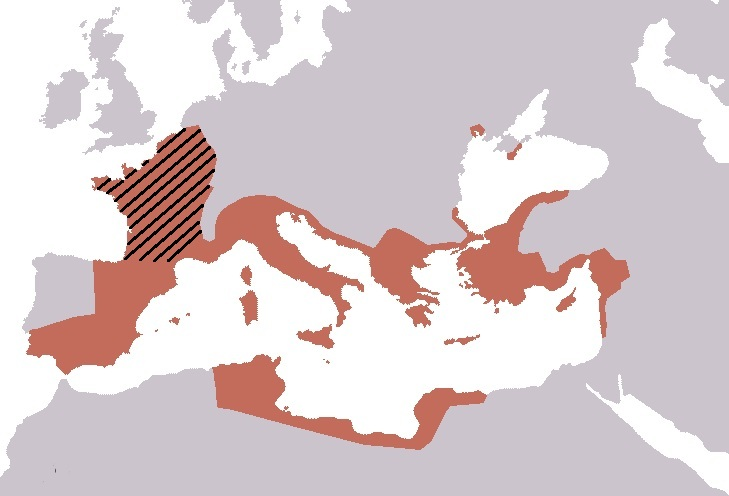
Roman-controlled territory during Caesar's Civil War

Caesar moved on Dyrrachium (modern Durrës, Albania), where Pompey had an arsenal. Pompey hurried to defend Dyrrachium and arrived first. He built a fortified camp south of the city, so Caesar started to build a circumvallation to besiege it. Six attempts to break through by Pompey were repulsed. Caesar's troops suffered food shortages while Pompey's were supplied by sea. However, Pompey held a limited amount of land and this created shortages of fodder for his animals. Water was also scarce because Caesar had diverted the local streams. Pompey needed to break the siege. Torquatus led part of Pompey's army in an attack on a weak spot in Caesar's fortifications and broke through. Mark Antony and Caesar rushed up reinforcements and pushed him back. However, this weakened other parts of Caesar's line and after heavy fighting his troops fled. Pompey did not pursue, but Caesar broke off the siege. After much manoeuvring the two armies clashed at Pharsalus where Pompey was decisively defeated. Torquatus' role, if any, in this defeat is not known.

Retaining his imperium, or power to command, Torquatus was in Africa in 47. There the surviving boni raised an army which included 40,000 men (about 8 legions), a powerful cavalry force led by Caesar's former right-hand man, the talented Titus Labienus, forces of allied local kings and 60 war elephants. The two armies engaged in small skirmishes to gauge the strength of the opposing force, during which two legions switched to Caesar's side. Meanwhile, Caesar expected reinforcements from Sicily. In the beginning of February 46, Caesar arrived in Thapsus and besieged the city. The boni, led by Metellus Scipio, could not risk the loss of this position and were forced to accept battle. Scipio commanded "without skill or success", and Caesar won a crushing victory which ended the war. Torquatus fled the field along with Scipio, attempting to escape to Hispania, but was trapped at Hippo Regius by the fleet of Publius Sittius. Scipio committed suicide on board a ship and Torquatus either committed suicide with him or was captured and executed.

=== Epicurean ===
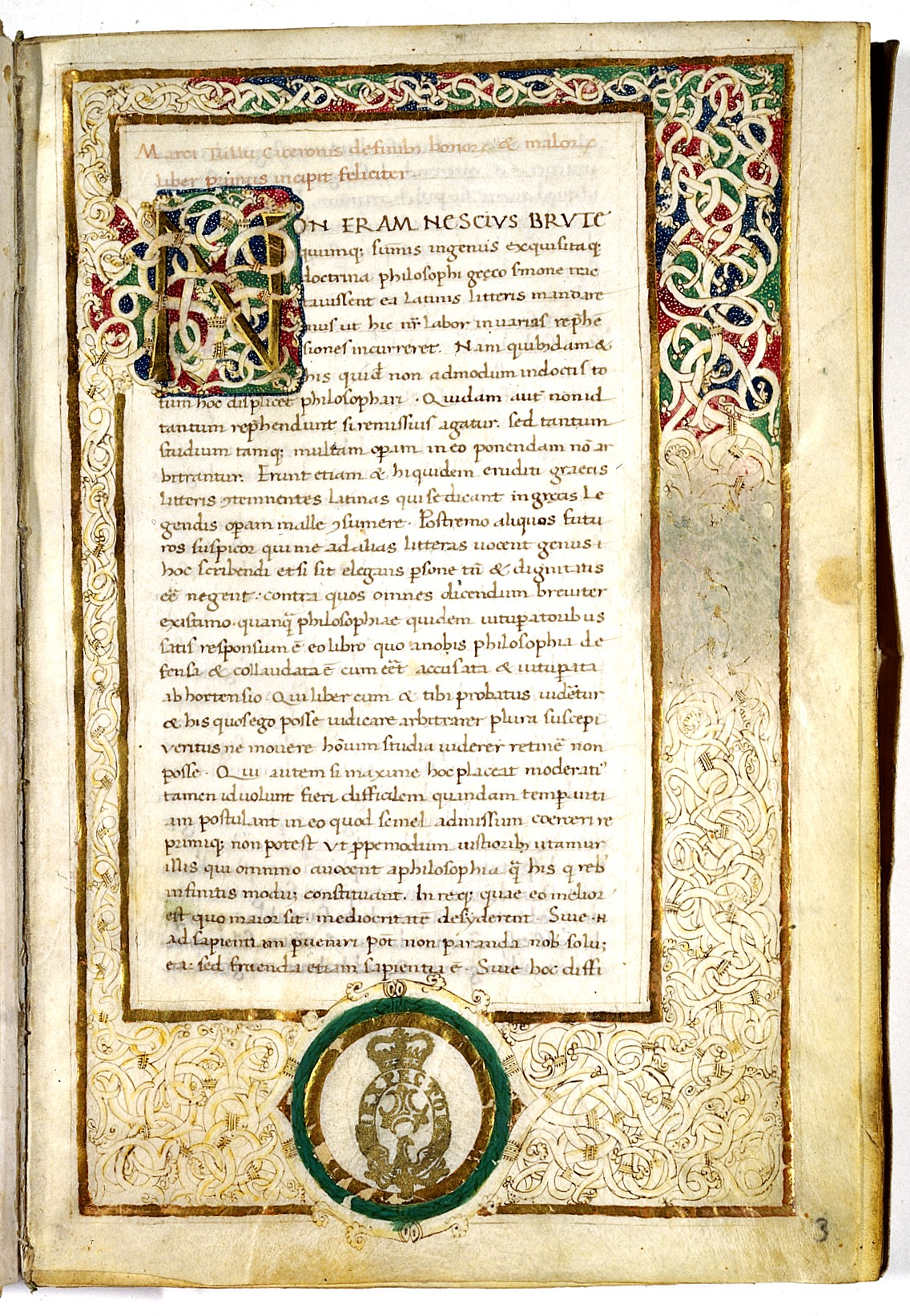
De finibus bonorum et malorum

I have finished the five books De Finibus Bonorum et Malorum, so as to give the Epicurean doctrine to Lucius Torquatus.

— Cicero

De finibus bonorum et malorum (On the ends of good and evil – De Finibus) is a philosophical work by the Roman orator, politician and philosopher Marcus Tullius Cicero. It consists of five books, in which Cicero explains the philosophical views of Epicureanism, Stoicism, and Platonism. Torquatus was a leading epicurean and was noted by Cicero for his knowledge of Greek literature and his breadth of learning. He was also a friend of Marcus Junius Brutus to whom the book was dedicated. (And who was shortly to be one of the assassins of Julius Caesar.) He was portrayed by Cicero in the first two books of De Finibus as a spokesman advocating Epicurean ethics.

In the first book he [Cicero] attacks the doctrines of the Epicurean school, and Torquatus defends them, alleging that they had been generally misunderstood; and in the second book Cicero enumerates the chief arguments with which the Stoics assailed them.

The work was written in 45, after Torquatus' death, but the debate is set in 50.

== Sources ==
- Anthon, Charles & Smith, William. (1850) A New Classical Dictionary of Greek and Roman Biography, Mythology and Geography. London. OCLC 66925767
- Broughton, T. Robert S., The Magistrates of the Roman Republic, Vol II (1952) New York: American Philological Association. OCLC 868514975
- Holland, Tom (2004). Rubicon: The Triumph and Tragedy of the Roman Republic. London: Abacus. ISBN 978-0-349-11563-4.
- Holmes, T. Rice, The Roman Republic and the Founder of the Empire, Vol. I (1923) Cambridge: The Clarendon Press. OCLC 2845034
- Holmes, T. Rice, The Roman Republic and the Founder of the Empire, Vol. II (1923) Cambridge: The Clarendon Press. OCLC 163400823
- Holmes, T. Rice, The Roman Republic and the Founder of the Empire, Vol. III (1923) Cambridge: The Clarendon Press. OCLC 889250448
- Smith, William (2005). A Dictionary of Greek and Roman Biography and Mythology. Ann Arbor, Michigan: University of Michigan Library.
- Sheppard, Simon, (2006) Pharsalus 48 B.C.: Caesar and Pompey – Clash of the Titans. Oxford; New York: Osprey. ISBN 978-1-84603-814-3
- Syme, Ronald, (1958) "Imperator Caesar: A Study in Nomenclature", Historia: Zeitschrift für Alte Geschichte, v7 n2 (19580401): 172–188. ISSN 0018-2311
- Yonge, Charles Duke, (2016) "An Introduction to Treatise de Finibus"
