= Battle of the Bagradas River =

The Battle of Bagradas, the Bagradas, or the Bagradas River (the ancient name of the Medjerda) may refer to:

- Battle of the Bagradas River (255 BC), also known as the Battle of Tunis, during the First Punic War
- Battle of the Bagradas River (240 BC), also known as the Battle of the Macar, during the Mercenary War
- Battle of the Bagradas River (203 BC), usually known as the Battle of the Great Plains, during the Second Punic War
- Battle of the Bagradas River (49 BC), a battle during the Roman civil war between Caesar and Pompey
- Battle of the Bagradas River (536), a battle between the rebel leader Stotzas and Byzantine commander Belisarius
