= Battle of the Bagradas (49 BC) =

North African battle of Caesar's civil war

Battle of the Bagradas River
- Part of Caesar's Civil War
Date	24 August 49 BC
Location	Medjerda River, Tunisia 36°52′48″N 9°57′54″E
Result	Optimates victory

Belligerents
Populares	Optimates; Numidia; Garamantes

Commanders and leaders
Gaius Scribonius Curio †; Gaius Caninius Rebilus	Saburra; Juba I of Numidia

Units involved
Legio XV; Legio XVI; Gallic auxiliary cavalry	Saburra's vanguard Army of Juba I of Numidia: Iberian and Gallic cavalry; Numidian light cavalry; Numidian light infantry

Strength
7,500 infantry (15 cohorts of legionaries); 500 cavalry	Juba's army with 60 elephants

Casualties and losses
Heavy – 2 legions destroyed	Minimal
- Location within Tunisia Battle of the Bagradas (49 BC) (Mediterranean)

The Battle of the Bagradas (49 BC) occurred near the Bagradas River (the classical name of the Medjerda) in what is now Tunisia on 24 August and was fought between Julius Caesar's general Gaius Scribonius Curio and the Pompeian Republicans under Publius Attius Varus and King Juba I of Numidia. The result was a crushing defeat for the Caesarean forces and the death of Curio.

== Background ==
Engaged in a civil war with the Roman general Gnaeus Pompeius Magnus and a hostile group of Republican senators, in 49 BC Julius Caesar sent a force to North Africa under the command of Gaius Scribonius Curio to deal with the Pompeian forces there. Overconfident and holding the usurping governor of Africa, Publius Attius Varus, in low esteem, Curio took fewer of his legions than were available to him, leaving two behind in Sicily. After getting the better of Varus's Numidian allies in a number of skirmishes, he defeated Varus at the Battle of Utica, who fled into the town of Utica. In the confusion of the battle, Curio was urged to take the town before Varus could regroup, but he held himself back, as he did not have the means at hand to undertake an assault of the town. The next day however, he began to form a contravallation of Utica, with the intent of starving the town into submission. Varus was approached by the leading citizens of the town, who begged him to surrender and spare the town the horrors of a siege. Varus, however, had just learned that King Juba was on his way with a large force, and so reassured them that with Juba's assistance, Curio would soon be defeated. Curio, also hearing that Juba's army was less than 23 miles from Utica, abandoned the siege, making his way to his base on the Castra Cornelia.

== Preliminary operations ==
Quickly entrenching himself in the Castra Cornelia, he sent an urgent message to Sicily, requesting that his officers immediately send the two legions and the cavalry he had left behind. His initial plan was to defend his position until the reinforcements arrived, as he had access to the sea, allowing easy resupply and communications with Sicily, and locally there was sufficient water, food, and timber to meet his needs.

He quickly changed his mind, however, when some apparent deserters from Utica appeared with information about the approaching Numidian forces. They insisted that King Juba was nowhere in the vicinity, that in fact he was some 120 miles away near Leptis, dealing with an uprising there. They informed Curio that the approaching 'army' was in fact only a small body of troops under Juba's military commander, Saburra. Relieved by this news, Curio sent his cavalry out after sunset with orders to locate Saburra's camp and then to wait for Curio and the rest of the army. Leaving a quarter of his forces guarding his own camp under the command of Marcius Rufus, Curio began his march to the Bagradas River about two hours before dawn.

Saburra had his camp some 10 miles away from the Bagradas, but his advance party had already reached the river. Curio's cavalry stumbled upon them in the early hours of the morning as they slept in their tents and, taking advantage of their confusion, proceeded to attack. The Numidians were unable to mount any resistance; the majority were either killed or captured and the rest of the advance scouting party fled. Flushed with success, the cavalry did not wait by the river, but rather rode back to find Curio, meeting him about six miles south of the Castra Cornelia. Curio questioned the prisoners, who informed him that Saburra was in command of the forces on the Bagradas. Proposing to attack Saburra whilst his forces were in disarray, Curio ordered a forced march towards the river; he was unconcerned having to leave the majority of his cavalry behind due to the exhausted state of the horses, and proceeded with his reduced legions and 200 cavalry.

In the meantime, Juba, whose camp was further down and on the other side of the Bagradas and about six miles to the rear of Saburra, heard word of the skirmish by the river. He immediately dispatched his Spanish and Gallic mercenary bodyguard, comprising some 2,000 cavalry, together with a hand picked body of infantry to reinforce Saburra. Juba then forded the river with the remainder of his troops and proceeded northward. Saburra, who was convinced that Curio would attack swiftly, gave orders to feign a retreat as soon as the Romans came into view, warning his men to be ready for a signal to turn around and attack.

== Battle ==
Moving away from the river, Curio eventually saw the army of Saburra. When Curio saw the retreating backs of the Numidians, he believed his tactics were playing out as expected. Descending from the heights that bordered a sandy and waterless plain, he and his men moved to engage the Numidians. Due to the heat, his soldiers were soon both tired and thirsty. Saburra gave the signal, and his forces turned around and engaged the flagging Romans. Relying solely on his cavalry, he kept his infantry in reserve and a good distance from the fighting. The open and level plain was perfect for the Numidian horsemen, who continually harassed the Roman legionaries. Nevertheless, the Romans fought well under the circumstances, and initially forced Saburra to give ground as they moved inexorably forward.

However, their fatigue began to tell against Curio's troops, and they were too tired to pursue the Numidians who were steadily falling back, and Curio's cavalry were too few and too tired to take advantage of the break in the attack. Soon the Numidian cavalry had returned and began to envelop the Roman line, pushing in to attack the Roman rear. Each time a cohort attempted to engage the enemy, the Numidians would disengage and swing away, before wheeling around and close around the legionaries, preventing them from rejoining the line and cutting them down where they stood. Even worse for the Romans was that Juba was continually reinforcing Saburra with fresh reserves, while the Romans continued to weaken as the battle went on. With Roman resolve weakening, Curio tried to bolster their spirits, calling on them to stand firm. But he soon realized that his forces were beginning to crack, so he ordered his army to retreat northward to some low hills that bordered the plain. Saburra saw what was happening and had his cavalry cut off Curio's retreat. The Romans began to scatter, cut down as they ran, while others simply lay down on the ground exhausted, waiting for death.

One of Curio's legates, Gnaeus Domitius, rode up to Curio with a handful of men, and urged him to flee and make it back to the camp. Curio queried how he could ever look Caesar in the face after he had lost him his army, and turning to face the oncoming Numidians, fought on until he was killed. Only a few soldiers managed to escape the bloodbath that followed, while the three hundred cavalry that had not followed Curio into battle returned to the camp at Castra Cornelia, bearing the bad news.

== Aftermath ==
Marcius Rufus, left in charge of the detachment at Castra Cornelia, attempted to hold discipline after news of the disaster reached the camp. He ordered the captains of the transports and the other ships to have their boats ready to transport the troops back onto the ships. But with Juba's army rapidly approaching, and Varus's legions positioning themselves to attack, discipline rapidly broke down. The majority of the galleys and transports fled without waiting to collect the stranded soldiers, while the few who sent boats to ferry the soldiers back were quickly swamped by terrified soldiers, and many sank in the process. The soldiers fought with each other to get a place on the boats, and many of the boats, having seen what had happened to the first ones to shore, held back. The sailors on the boats finally agreed to take a few of the married soldiers who had families back home, while others swam out to the ships and were pulled aboard. Among the handful that escaped were Gaius Caninius Rebilus and Gaius Asinius Pollio.

The remaining soldiers sent their centurions as delegates to Varus, seeking assurances that they would not be harmed; Varus gave his word. However, when Juba arrived he decided to make an example of them, and apart from a handful of senators, executed Curio's remaining soldiers. Juba, riding into Utica and escorted by a group of armed senators loyal to Pompey, met with Varus and took control of the city. Juba sent a message to Pompey and the Republican senators in Macedonia, who responded by granting him the title of King of Numidia. Caesar and the remains of the Roman Senate proclaimed him a public enemy. Juba then returned to Numidia, along with the captured senators for display and execution.

== See also ==
- Other Battles of the Bagradas in antiquity

== Sources ==
- Goldsworthy, Adrian Keith, Caesar's Civil War, 49–44 BC, Osprey Publishing, 2002
- Holland, Tom, Rubicon: The Triumph and Tragedy of the Roman Republic, Abacus, 2004
- Holmes, T. Rice, The Roman Republic and the Founder of the Empire, Vol III, Oxford University Press, 1923
- Roller, Duane W., The World of Juba II and Kleopatra Selene: royal scholarship on Rome's African frontier, Taylor & Francis e-Library, 2004
- Gardner, Jane F (translator), Julius Caesar – The Civil War Penguin Books 1967
