= Publius Cornelius Scipio Nasica (praetor 93 BC) =

Publius Cornelius Scipio Nasica was a Roman patrician and politician of the Roman Republic in the early 1st century BC. He was the biological father of Metellus Scipio.

== Family ==
Publius Cornelius Scipio Nasica was born into the illustrious patrician gens Cornelia. He was the son of Publius Cornelius Scipio Nasica, consul in 111 BC. His grandfather was Publius Cornelius Scipio Serapio, consul in 133 BC, Pontifex maximus, and the man responsible for the murder of Tiberius Gracchus.

== Career ==
Scipio Nasica served as praetor in 93 BC. During his tenure he suppressed a rebellion in Hispania. For whatever reason, this well placed patrician never held the consulship.

His last attestation is in 80 BC as a defense lawyer of Sextus Roscius, alongside the young Marcus Tullius Cicero.

== Marriage ==
Scipio Nasica married Licinia, daughter of Lucius Licinius Crassus, consul in 95 BC and a famed orator. They had two children:

- Quintus Caecilius Metellus Pius Scipio (born Publius Cornelius Scipio Nasica and later adopted by Quintus Caecilius Metellus Pius consul in 80 BC).
- Lucius Licinius Crassus Scipio (adopted by his maternal grandfather, whom was without sons.)
