= Publius Sittius =

1st century BC Roman mercenary commander

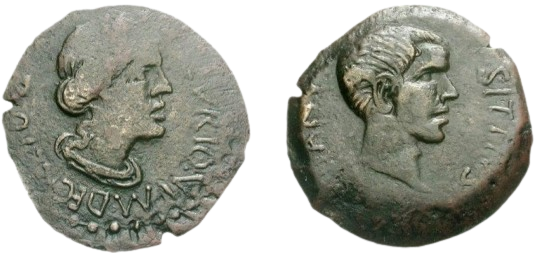
- Bronze coin minted in Cirta by Publius Sittius.

Ruler of western Numidia
- Reign: 46–44 BC
- Predecessor: Massinissa II
- Successor: Arabio
- Born: c.88 BC; Nuceria Alfaterna
- Died: c. spring 44 BC; Numidia
- Issue: Publius Sittius
- Father: Publius Sittius

Publius Sittius (died 44 BC) was a Roman eques and mercenary commander who as a mercenary was employed by king Bocchus II of East-Mauretania.

Sittius fought for Bocchus against king Juba I of Numidia, capturing Juba's capital of Cirta and defeating the Numidian army under general Saburra (the victor of the Battle of the Bagradas).

He also supported Julius Caesar in the civil war between Caesar and the Optimates, ultimately catching and killing Faustus Cornelius Sulla and Lucius Afranius as well as destroying Scipio's fleet off Hippo Regius. He was a personal friend of Marcus Tullius Cicero.

== Biography ==
=== Life ===
Publius Sittius hailed from Nuceria in Campania. His father, also called Publius Sittius, supported Rome during the War of the Allies.

Sittius, who hailed from the local elite of his city, first established himself as a "financial operator" a figure distinct from a professional banker, who typically conducts business locally within the city where he operates; rather, he belonged to an intermediate stratum of major businessmen. He appears to have been quite astute, as according to Cicero, who claimed his friendship, he was owed enormous sums "across the provinces and kingdoms." In 64 BC, he had his affairs in Italy liquidated by Publius Cornelius Sulla, a nephew of Sulla, in order to settle his debts in Rome, and then departed to "settle a major account" with the king of Mauretania. Following his departure, he was suspected of sedition in support of P. Sulla, an allegation that Cicero refutes in his "Pro Sulla". The precise reasons and motivations for his departure remain unclear, however, with some authors suggesting it may have been linked to a proscription. According to Sallust, he was associated with Catiline, who claimed to his fellow conspirators that P. Publius Sittius Nucerinus was in Mauretania with an army, "aware of his plan."

After Catiline was defeated; Sittius sold his Spanish and Italian holdings and remained in Mauretania with his men. With that, he asembled a mercenary army in Africa, composed primarily of Italians who had been proscribed, left discontented, or ruined by the civil wars, and who remained loyal to him. He placed these troops at the disposal of various North African potentates, a region then beset by numerous conflicts and did not hesitate to switch sides whenever a better offer arose. In the process, he amassed a fortune and earned a reputation as a skilled strategist.

When the Great Civil War between Caesar and the Optimates started Publius Sittius was still in Mauretania. His mercenary company was in the employ of king Bocchus II of Eastern Mauretania.

Publius Sittius is mentioned in De Bello Africo, the history of the civil war in Africa, seen by a supporter of Caesar (Chs. 25, 36, 48, 93, 95 & 96; the author is unknown). It is not clear from this text how Sittius came to be in Africa or why he had allied himself with Caesar and not Metellus Scipio. His first recorded action (Ch. 25) in the history joins forces with King Bogus of Mauritanea (or Bocchus II), attacking and forcing the surrender of Cirta, the richest town within the Kingdom of King Juba I, an enemy of Caesar who had already begun to send his army to support Scipio. This event forced King Juba to adjust his plans and return part of his army to defend his territory thereby diminishing Scipio's available manning.

It is recorded that Sittius enjoyed several successes against the enemies of Caesar (Ch. 36), including later the defeat of Juba's forces under Saburra, and the successful ambush of Faustus Cornelius and Lucius Afranius as they attempted to flee to Spain following their defeat by Caesar at Thapsus (Ch. 95). He is also credited with the sinking of Scipio's fleet (Ch. 96) at Hippo Regius where Scipio perished having also taken flight from Caesar after Thapsus. He notably assists Caesar through the campaign by diverting the attention and full strength of King Juba's forces (Ch. 48), preventing him from focusing his resolve entirely on the annihilation of Caesar.

While it is clear his efforts support Caesar, and he is in the service of Caesar, at no point in the text does it mention that Sittius is commanded by Caesar although it could be expected that communications existed between them or their subordinates. After the end of the campaign Caesar grants him lands at Cirta, within Western Numidia where he founded a colony with his followers the Colonia Cirta Sittianorum cognomine and settled there. He was killed by Arabio, a son of the Numidian king Masinissa II in 44 BC.

=== Legacy ===
Although the territory of Sittius did not remain independent following the death of Julius Caesar, being instead annexed to the province of Africa Nova, the colonies established by his mercenaries retained the privileges granted to them in the wake of their campaigns. Based on names found on epitaphs in this region, it appears that at least some of Sittius’s mercenaries originated from Campania like their leader while others came from Spain. Furthermore, the nomen (family name) "Sittius" became very common in this part of the empire.
