= Battle of Utica (49 BC) =

49 BC battle, part of Caesar's civil war

- Part of Caesar's Civil War
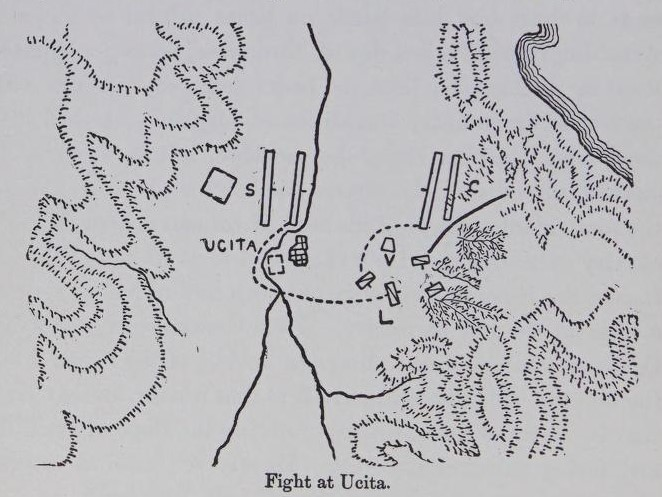
- The first phase of the battle
Date	49 BC
Location	Utica, North Africa 37°03′28.6″N 10°03′45.35″E
Result	Caesarian victory

Belligerents
Caesarians	Pompeians; Numidia

Commanders and leaders
Gaius Scribonius Curio; Gaius Caninius Rebilus	Publius Attius Varus

Units involved
Legio XV; Legio XVI; Gallic auxiliary cavalry	3 unknown Optimates' legions Numidian light infantry and cavalry

Strength
10,000+ (2 legions + 500 Gallic cavalry)	15,000+ (3 legions + unknown number of Numidian allies)

Casualties and losses
100	1,600
- Location within modern Tunisia

The Battle of Utica (49 BC) in Caesar's Civil War was fought between Julius Caesar's general Gaius Scribonius Curio and Pompeian legionaries commanded by Publius Attius Varus supported by Numidian cavalry and foot soldiers sent by King Juba I of Numidia. Curio defeated the Pompeians and Numidians and drove Varus back into the town of Utica.

== Background ==
With Caesar's crossing of the Rubicon in January 49 BC, he plunged the Roman Republic into civil war with a clique of Roman senators who were determined to destroy him, under the military leadership of Pompey. Having pushed through Italy in an attempt to reach Pompey and detach him from the Republican leadership, he was unable to prevent them taking ship at Brundisium and fleeing to Epirus. Instead of pursuing them, Caesar decided to deal with the Pompeian forces holding important western provinces. So in March 49 BC, while he himself marched to Hispania, he sent thirty-one cohorts (the optimate army that had surrendered and switched sides to him at Corfinium) to Africa under the command of Gaius Scribonius Curio to deal with the Pompeian forces there. Prior to Curio's departure, this force was supplemented by an additional legion and 1,000 Gallic cavalry. As Curio had little experience in war, he appointed a trusted military subordinate, Gaius Caninius Rebilus, as Curio's legate.

By this point Africa was held by Attius Varus, who, after fleeing from Auximum during Caesar's march through Italy, had made his way to Utica. He found the province in a state of limbo, as the propraetor, Considius Longus, had finished his term as governor and had returned to Italy, and his designated successor, Aelius Tubero, had not yet arrived. Varus had previously been the Propraetor of Africa some years before, and now decided to take possession of the province in Pompey's name. Using his local knowledge, and the local connections built up through his clientela, he managed to raise two legions. When Tubero finally appeared off Utica to take up his post, Varus drove him off and forced him to leave. To further cement his position in Africa, Varus relied on the support of King Juba of Numidia, a client state, whose father owed his position to Pompey, while Juba himself had a personal grudge against Curio, because, as plebeian tribune, Curio had once proposed a law that would have converted Numidia into a Roman province.

In the interim, Curio had crossed into Sicily, forcing out a leading Republican senator, Marcus Porcius Cato, who fled Syracuse on April 23, 49 BC to join Pompey in the east. With the opposition in Sicily suppressed with no fighting, Curio decided to remain there, wanting to hear of developments in Spain before committing himself to the African campaign. It was not until early August that Curio, leaving half his forces in Sicily, embarked from Lilybaeum, and a fleet of one hundred transports and twelve galleys transported two legions and 500 cavalry, and, chasing off the patrolling ships of Lucius Caesar, disembarked at Thonara Bay at Cape Bon.

== Preliminary operations ==
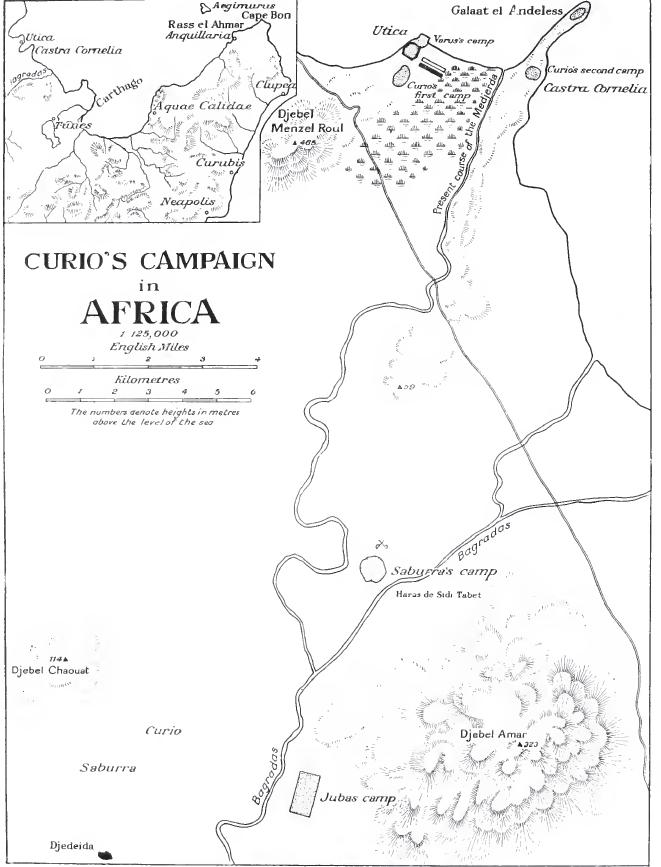
Map showing Curio's campaign in Africa

After ordering his fleet to sail to Utica, Curio began his march there around the gulf. Within three days he had reached the southern bank of the Bagradas river. Leaving the infantry there with Rebilus, he took his cavalry and rode northward to scout out a camp near Utica, the Castra Cornelia, situated on a hill to the west of the town. From that position he was able to assess Varus's camp, which was situated next to the town, with his further side protected by Utica's north-eastern wall, while his nearer side was protected by the sea and an outdoor theatre, ensuring that his camp could only be approached by a narrow passage. Turning south, he noticed a stream of fugitives fleeing to the safety of Utica's walls, and he decided to attack the crowds to instil panic. This forced Varus to send 1,000 Numidian troops (600 cavalry and 400 soldiers) to their rescue. The two forces clashed and the Numidians, unused to close quarters fighting, were repulsed, losing 120 men in the process, as the remainder of the troops retreated to the town.

Next, Curio, observing that some 200 ships containing the supplies for Varus's army lay unprotected in Utica's harbour, and that his fleet was already in position, decided to take possession of the supplies. He ordered the captains of the vessels to remove their cargoes and place them on the shore, next to where Curio was planning to make his camp. After threatening to kill them, they complied and promptly set sail after they had emptied their holds.

Returning victorious to his camp on the Bagradas, the legions acclaimed him as Imperator. The next day he ordered his forces to march towards Utica, but instead of heading towards the Castra Cornelia which he had spied out for his camp, he decided to take the offensive and placed himself on a ridge to the south-west of the town. His soldiers were still preparing their camp when patrols reported seeing large Numidian reinforcements on their way, King Juba having sent them to reinforce Varus's position. When they came into view, Curio, who had not bothered to send out scouts, started showing signs of nervousness. He urgently sent out his cavalry to impede the Numidian advance, while he impatiently recalled his legionaries from the trenches and began to line them up in battle formation. His cavalry engaged the Numidians who, approaching in a disorganized fashion, were caught unawares and were dispersed with heavy losses. Before Curio could send his legions in, the Numidian cavalry had escaped from the slaughter, and quickly made their way into the town.

The following night, two centurions, accompanied by twenty-two men, deserted Curio's camp and made their way to Varus. They told him that Curio's troops were deeply unhappy with their commander, and that he should attempt to win them over prior to battle. Varus agreed with this strategy and the following morning, he assembled his troops and led them out of their camp. Curio followed suit. The two armies were separated by a valley some 70 metres (230 ft) in width, between the town and a morass, with Curio's right flank and Varus's left touching by the morass. Varus's brother, Sextus Quintilius Varus, a senator, emerged from Varus's troops and urged Curio's troops not to fight for their commander, but to join their own side. The troops listened in silence, and Varus returned to his camp, with Curio again doing the same. That day, with Curio's men contemplating abandoning their commander, Curio summoned his officers to seek their advice. Some counselled Curio to attack immediately, before mutiny could break out. Others suggested that he wait and let Varus come to him, giving his soldiers time to calm themselves down. Curio rejected both sets of advice and decided to talk to the men directly. Ordering his troops to line up, he reminded them of their oaths to Caesar, and that they had acclaimed him Imperator. By the time he was done, his troops had been brought around to supporting him, and all mutterings subsided.

== Battle ==
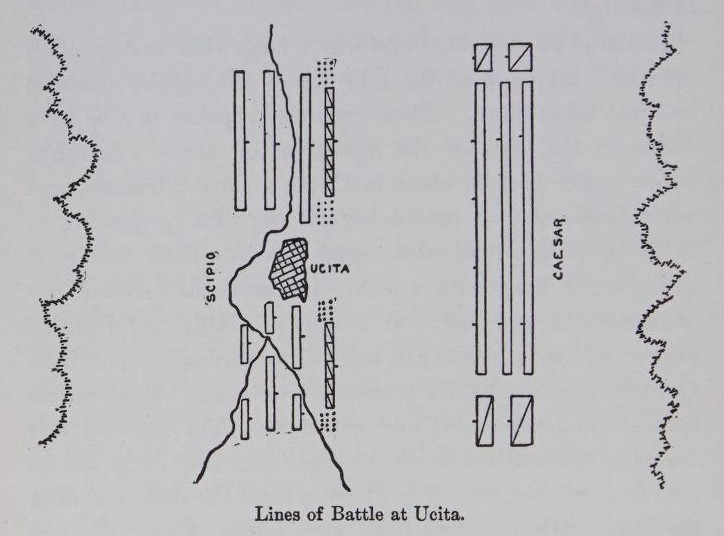
The second phase of the battle

The next day it was Curio who led his men out for battle, with Varus following. They lined up their troops as they had the day before, on either side of the valley. Although the sides of the valley were only about seven feet high, they were quite steep, so each army waited for the other to commence operations and start crossing the valley. Eventually Varus ordered the Numidian cavalry, with support from lightly armed auxiliaries, to cross the valley. As they proceeded, Curio sent in his cavalry, supported by two cohorts, and they launched themselves at Varus's advancing troops. The Numidian cavalry, already having been beaten two days before, turned around and fled. The auxiliaries in turn were surrounded and slaughtered where they stood. At this point Curio's legate, Gaius Caninius Rebilus, turned to Curio and urged him to take the opportunity and press his advantage. Reminding his men of the oaths they had taken the day before, Curio led the charge. Crossing the valley and scrambling up the enemy embankment, Curio discovered that Varus's men had broken and run. Chasing after them, many of Varus's troops were trampled to death by their own men in their haste to flee, while others were killed by Curio's men. Many never stopped until they reached the town of Utica. Varus was so completely demoralised that he withdrew almost his entire army into the town, leaving only a trumpeter and a few tents behind to keep up appearances. The end result was Varus lost some 600 men, while another 1,000 were wounded; Curio's own tally of injured came to 100.

== Aftermath ==
In the confusion of the battle, Curio was urged to take the town before Varus could regroup, but he held himself back, as he did not have the means at hand to undertake an assault of the town. The next day however, he began to form a contravallation of Utica, with the intent of starving the town into submission. Varus was approached by the leading citizens of the town, who begged him to surrender and spare the town the horrors of a siege. Varus, however, had just learned that King Juba was on his way with a large force, and so reassured them that with Juba's assistance, Curio would soon be defeated. Curio heard similar reports and abandoned the siege, making his way to the Castra Cornelia. False reports from Utica about Juba's strength caused him to drop his guard, leading to the Battle of the Bagradas River.

== Sources ==
- Goldsworthy, Adrian Keith, Caesar’s Civil War, 49 – 44 BC, Osprey Publishing, 2002
- Holland, Tom, Rubicon: The Triumph and Tragedy of the Roman Republic, Abacus, 2004
- Holmes, T. Rice, The Roman Republic and the Founder of the Empire, Vol III, Oxford University Press, 1923
- Syme, Ronald, The Roman Revolution, Clarendon Press, Oxford, 1939
