= Numidian cavalry =

Ancient North African light cavalry

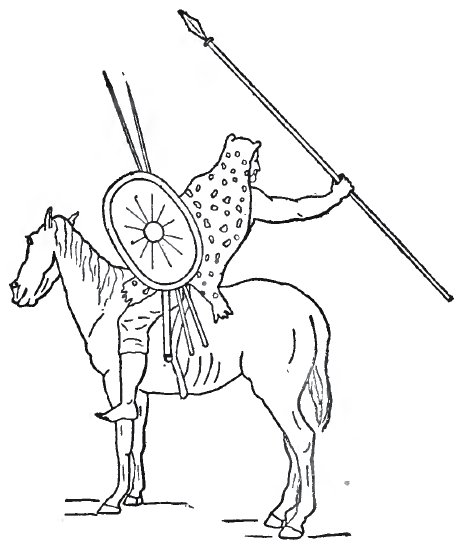
A Numidian Cavalryman

Numidian cavalry was a branch of the Numidian army and a type of light cavalry developed by the Numidians. They were utilized by Hannibal during the Punic Wars, and later became commonplace in the Roman army of the late Republic.

== History ==
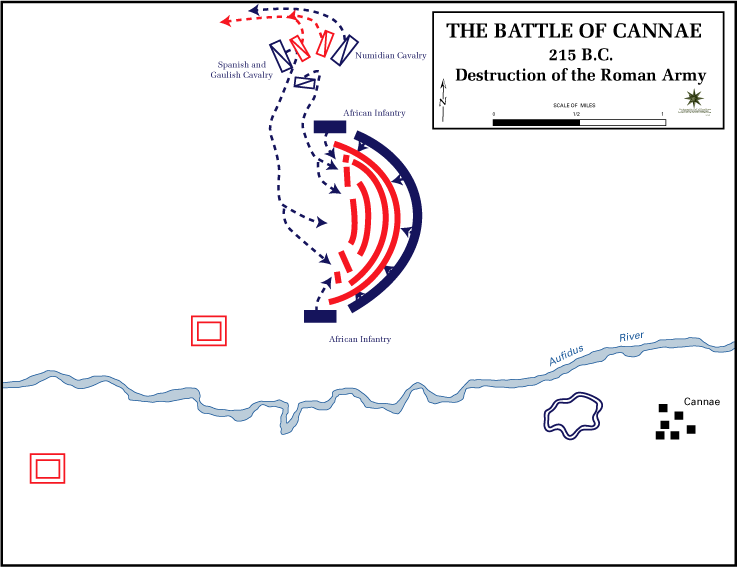
The battle of Cannae, where the Numidian cavalry helped to defeat the Roman cavalry, allowing the Carthaginians (blue) to encircle and defeat the Roman army (red)

Numidian cavalry is first mentioned by Polybius as part of the Carthaginian army during the First Punic War.

The Numidian cavalry's horses, ancestors of the Berber horse, were small compared with other horses of the era, and were well adapted for faster movement over long distances. Numidian horsemen rode without saddles or bridles, controlling their mounts with a simple rope around their horse's neck and a small riding stick. They had no form of bodily protection except for a round leather shield or a leopard skin, and their main weapons were javelins in addition to a short sword. Due to their expert horsemanship and agility, as well as their lack of armor or heavy weaponry, they were most suitable for harassing tactics, charging in loose formation and lobbing their javelins before wheeling off to escape the enemy's counterattack. This harassing tactic, while rarely decisive, could be extremely frustrating to a less mobile enemy, as experienced by Julius Caesar's soldiers during the latter's invasion of Africa.

The Numidians were extremely useful during small wars, and their presence certainly contributed greatly to the effectiveness of Hannibal's reconnaissance and intelligence. Hannibal's invasion of Rome during the Second Punic War is best known for his extremely limited use of slow-moving war elephants, but he also employed Numidian cavalry where faster movement was needed, such as luring the Romans into a trap at the Battle of Trebia and for fighting on his right flank.

Numidian cavalry were widely known and not only fought in the Carthaginian army, but in other armies of the time as well. Again during the Second Punic War, the Romans allied with the Numidian king Masinissa who led 6000 horsemen against Hannibal's own in the battle of Zama, where the "Numidian Cavalry turned the scales".

For centuries thereafter, the Roman army employed Numidian light cavalry in separate units (equites Numidarum or Maurorum).

The Numidian cavalry were also used in Caesar's civil war on the side of Pompey and were used in Battle of Utica.

== See also ==
- Military of Carthage
- Jinete, a similar medieval military unit in Al Andalus that originated from the Zenata Imazighen
