= The World of Juba II and Kleopatra Selene =

2003 book by Duane W. Roller

- Author: Duane W. Roller
- Genre: Nonfiction
- Publisher: Routledge
- Publication date: 2003

The World of Juba II and Kleopatra Selene is a 2003 history book by Duane W. Roller. It was published by Routledge.

== Reception ==
Josephine Crawley Quinn, in a review in Bryn Mawr Classical Review, praised the book's "its judicious combination of material and literary evidence".

David Cherry, in The Classical Review, wrote that he was "disappointed" by the absence of a clear argument about the character and significance of Juba II and Cleopatra Selene II, but noted that Roller approached the historical evidence in a "cautious and meticulous" manner.
