= Lucius Afranius (consul) =

Roman consul in 60 BC (died 46 BC)

- Born: Cossignano, Picenum, Italy
- Died: 46 BC; Mauretania
- Cause of death: Killed in prisoner mutiny
- Occupations: General and Politician
- Office: Consul (60 BC); Legate

Military service
- Allegiance: Roman Republic; Sulla; Pompey
- Rank: Legate
- Battles/wars: Social War; Sulla's civil war; Sertorian War; Battle of Sucro; Third Mithridatic War; Caesar's Civil War †; Battle of Ilerda; Siege of Dyrrhachium; Battle of Pharsalus; Battle of Thapsus

Lucius Afranius (died 46 BC) was an ancient Roman plebeian and a client of Pompey the Great. He served Pompey as a legate during his Iberian campaigns, his eastern campaigns and remained in his service right through to the Civil War. He died in Africa right after the Battle of Thapsus in 46 BC.

== Early career ==
Lucius Afranius was born into a humble family in Picenum. As a Picentine, he was favoured during his career by Pompey, who was a scion of Picenum's most distinguished family. Afranius probably served under Pompey's father Gnaeus Pompeius Strabo during the Social War and under Pompey himself during the Civil War.

=== Sertorian War ===
Afranius served as a legate under Pompey during his campaigns against Marian supporter Quintus Sertorius in Spain. He played a pivotal role at the battle of Sucro in 75 BC. Sertorius attacked Pompey's left wing, which was under Afranius' command. Afranius held until Sertorius' attention was drawn away by Pompey's attack into Sertorius' own left. When Sertorius moved his forces to counter this, Afranius led an attack against the Sertorian right. This attack routed the enemy and Afranius pursued them into their camp. Afranius' soldiers caused a great many casualties and began looting the enemy camp and supply train. Meanwhile, Pompey had been routed by Sertorius, and the looting forces of Afranius were attacked by the victorious Sertorians. It was only the timely arrival of Quintus Caecilius Metellus Pius which turned the tide in Pompey's favour.

=== Mithridates ===
Despite the unprecedented size of Pompey's corps of legates—he received the right to appoint 24 of these senior adjutants—for his scourge of the pirates from the Mediterranean, Afranius did not number amongst them, as his patron chose to cultivate his links with the Roman aristocracy by appointing only men of distinguished family. After the success of this campaign, however, Pompey was given the command in the east and appointed Afranius as his legate for this new campaign. After the initial successes against Mithradates VI of Pontus and Tigranes the Great of the Kingdom of Armenia, Pompey began to pursue the defeated enemy northwards.

Pompey left Armenia under the military supervision of Afranius. Looking to take advantage of a defeated neighbour, Phraates III of Parthia invaded Armenia at Corduene and began pillaging. According to historian Cassius Dio (XXXVII, 5), Afranius retook the district without a conflict with Phraates' forces. However, Plutarch (Pompey 36) asserts that Afranius marched against the Parthians, drove them out of Armenia, and pursued them as far as the district of Arbela (modern Erbil, Iraq) within the borders of the Parthian Empire.

After his second victory over Mithridates, Pompey realised that pursuing him was futile and instead invested forces to defend Pontus from Mithridates' return. Afranius was given command against the Arabians of Amanus, and his victory against them cleared the way for Pompey's advance into Syria.

== Return to Rome and consulship ==
After his victorious campaign in the East, Pompey returned to Rome, and Afranius followed. Wishing to have his loyal legate elected as consul, Pompey began bribing the electors lavishly. Despite public knowledge and disapproval of this, Afranius was elected consul in 60, his consular colleague being Quintus Caecilius Metellus Celer. During this year, his actions showed a lack of understanding and ability in the management of the civil matters demanded by the office.

== Civil War ==
=== Legate in Hispania ===
When Pompey was granted Hispania (Iberia, comprising modern Spain and Portugal) as a proconsular province, Afranius, together with Marcus Petreius and Marcus Terentius Varro, governed in his stead, Pompey remaining in Rome to manage affairs there.

When Julius Caesar marched on Rome with legio XIII, he ordered his legate Gaius Fabius to march on Iberia and to secure the passes through the Pyrenees. Fabius was given command of three legions.

Afranius, with his three legions, was in possession of the passes. Afranius ordered Petreius, in command of two legions in Lusitania, to march for the Pyrenees to combine their forces. Varro was to remain in further Iberia with his two legions.

Fabius, reinforced with three additional veteran legions, advanced to the River Segre, where Afranius' force, now joined with Petreius' legions, was encamped. When two of Fabius' legions marched out to protect foragers and crossed the Segre, the bridge gave way, cutting off the small force. Afranius marched out to engage this smaller force, but Lucius Munatius Plancus, the Caesarian commander, formed up his legions on a rise with a good defence. Despite the size of Afranius' force, Plancus held. The approach of Caesarian reinforcements commanded by Fabius ended the engagement.

=== Ilerda ===
Caesar himself arrived to take command of Fabius' force. He left six cohorts to command the bridge and marched with the rest of his force for Ilerda. Afranius followed. Both forces encamped, but Afranius declined Caesar's challenge to battle. Caesar encamped his forces less than half a mile from Afranius' camp, which was constructed on a hill.

During his time in Iberia, Afranius had trained his legions to use a loose order formation, similar to that used so successfully by the Celtiberians and Lusitani. Caesar mentions the effectiveness of this formation in his Civil War Commentaries (I. XLIV).

Caesar attempted to build a wall separating Afranius' camp from the town of Ilerda. Afranius, seeing this, sent his army out to deploy on a small hill near the construction area. Caesar's men attacked, but Afranius' tactics almost led to their defeat, with Afranius being pushed back only when Caesar personally led legio IX in an attack. Afranius' soldiers retreated inside the town. There followed a see-saw battle lasting several hours, with neither side gaining advantage. The battle ended with roughly equal casualties, with both Afranius and Caesar counting the battle as a victory. The armies returned to their respective camps.

=== Stalemate and defeat ===
Afranius ordered the fortification of the small hill which the battle had been fought over. Over the next few days the river flooded, destroying the bridges and leaving Caesar stranded without food on the opposite side of the river from Afranius, who had a large stockpile of food and supplies. Afranius found out that a large supply convoy was approaching Caesar from Gaul, and he set out to attack and capture it. Though he failed to capture it, he did force the convoy to retreat. Afranius and Petreius sent dispatches to Rome claiming victory, and announcing that the war was all but over.

Despite this, Caesar constructed boats and transported a part of his cavalry force over to Afranius' side of the river. The cavalry set about harassing Afranius' supply lines, even annihilating a unit of republican reinforcements. Caesar constructed a bridge and began to harass Afranius' forces with his whole army. At the same time, several Iberian rulers pledged their support to Caesar's cause.

Over the next weeks, Afranius attempted unsuccessfully to deal with the Caesarian harassment. Several siegeworks were begun by both Caesarian and Republican troops. Caesar states that during this time, the adversaries were so close that they could talk to each other. The republican troops were convinced to surrender, with even Afranius' own son attempting to negotiate a surrender. Soon after this, several Caesarian troops were found to have wandered into the Republican camp. Afranius and Petreius ordered their execution. At the same time, several Republican troops had been seen wandering about in Caesar's camp. Caesar ordered these men treated with respect and sent back to Afranius.

When Afranius' men saw Caesar's clemency, their mind was made up. Caesar's forces stepped up the harassment of Afranius' troops, and soon food levels were low. Afranius, realising the situation, surrendered to Caesar. According to Caesar's commentaries, these were his words:

Caesar ought not to be displeased either with me or my soldiers, for wishing to preserve our attachment to our general, Gnaeus Pompey. We have now sufficiently discharged our duty to him, and have suffered punishment enough, in having endured the want of every necessity: but now, pent up almost like wild beasts, we are prevented from procuring water, and prevented from walking abroad; and are not able to bear the bodily pain or the mental disgrace: we confess ourselves vanquished: and beg and entreat, if there is any room left for mercy, that we should not be necessitated to suffer the most severe penalties.

Caesar pardoned all the Republicans, Afranius included—on the proviso that they did not join up with the Republicans still at large.

== Road to Thapsus ==
=== Disgrace and return ===
In the Republican camp, Atius Rufus charged Afranius with betraying his army. Despite this, Afranius, along with Petreius, broke his word to Caesar, embarked with as many loyal troops as he could gather and sailed for Epirus and Pompey. His Hispanian Cohorts were greatly appreciated by the Republicans, and he was welcomed back into the Republican fold. Afranius took no active command at Dyrrachium or Pharsalus, though he was no doubt there. After the Republican defeat at Pharsalus, Afranius, like most Republicans, fled to Africa.

=== Thapsus ===
After Caesar landed in Africa Province, his forces were harassed by Numidian light troops commanded by Afranius and his fellow Picentine, Titus Labienus. Upon seeing the treason of Afranius, Caesar ordered his execution upon sight. Afranius then fought under Metellus Scipio at the Battle of Thapsus. After the defeat, Afranius and Faustus Cornelius Sulla, son of Sulla the dictator, gathered some of the survivors of Thapsus and started to pillage eastern Mauretania (its king, Bocchus II, was allied to Caesar). They were ambushed and captured by Publius Sittius (a Roman mercenary commander working for Bocchus). After holding them for several days, the troops guarding them mutinied and killed all the leading Republican prisoners, including Afranius.

Political offices
Preceded by Marcus Pupius Piso Frugi Calpurnianus; Marcus Valerius Messalla Niger	Roman consul 60 BC with Quintus Caecilius Metellus Celer	Succeeded by Julius Caesar; Marcus Calpurnius Bibulus
