= Battle of Thapsus =

Battle of Caesar's civil war (46 BCE)

- Part of Caesar's Civil War
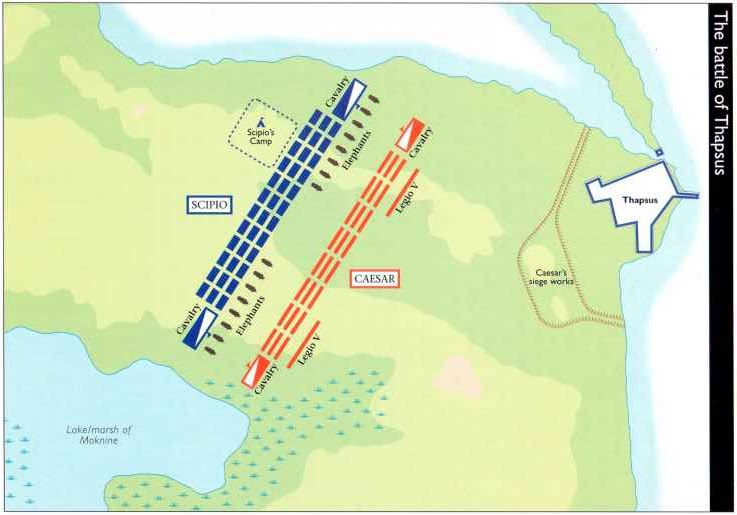
- Initial troop deployment of the battle
Date	April 6, 46 BC (Julian calendar)
Location	Thapsus (Tunisia), modern Ras Dimas 35.6244°N 11.0478°E
Result	Caesarian victory

Belligerents
Populares	Optimates; Numidia

Commanders and leaders
Gaius Julius Caesar	Metellus Scipio; Marcus Petreius; Juba I of Numidia; Titus Labienus; Lucius Afranius; Publius Attius Varus (fleet commander); Vergilius (garrison commander of Thapsus)

Units involved
Legio V (the fifth legion); Legio VII (the seventh legion); Legio VIII (the eighth legion); Legio IX (the ninth legion); Legio X (the tenth legion); Legio XIII (the thirteenth legion); Legio XIV (the fourteenth legion); Legio XXV (the twenty-fifth legion); Legio XXVI (the twenty-sixth legion); Legio XXVIII (the twenty-eighth legion); Legio XXIX (the twenty-ninth legion); Legio XXX (the thirtieth legion); Auxiliary Gallic cavalry; Auxiliary Germanic cavalry; Auxiliary Gaetulian cavalry	Optimates' army Juba's army

Strength
50,000−70,000 (at least 12 legions), 5,000 cavalry	70,000−90,000 (at least 12 legions), 14,500 cavalry Juba's allied troops with 60 elephants

Casualties and losses
Nearly 1,000	About 10,000

The Battle of Thapsus was a military engagement that took place on April 6, 46 BC near Thapsus (in modern Tunisia). The forces of the Optimates, led by Quintus Caecilius Metellus Scipio, were defeated by the forces of Julius Caesar. It was followed shortly by the suicides of Scipio and his ally, Marcus Porcius Cato Uticensis (Cato the Younger), the Numidian king Juba, and his Roman peer Marcus Petreius.

== Prelude ==
In 49 BC, the last civil war of the Roman Republic was initiated after Julius Caesar, who saw that his political enemies in Rome were looking to arrest and prosecute him, defied senatorial orders to disband his army following the conclusion of hostilities in Gaul. He crossed over the Rubicon river with the 13th Legion, a clear violation of Roman Law, and marched to Rome. The Optimates fled to Greece under the command of Pompey since they had not organised an army and were incapable of defending the city of Rome itself against Caesar. Led by Caesar, the Populares followed, but were greatly outnumbered and defeated in the Battle of Dyrrhachium. Still outnumbered, Caesar recovered and went on to decisively defeat the Optimates under Pompey at Pharsalus. Pompey then fled to Egypt, where to Caesar's consternation, Pompey was assassinated. The remaining Optimates, not ready to give up fighting, regrouped in the African provinces of Mauretania. Their leaders were Marcus Cato (the younger) and Caecilius Metellus Scipio. Other key figures from the nobility in the resistance were Titus Labienus, Publius Attius Varus, Lucius Afranius, Marcus Petreius and the brothers Sextus and Gnaeus Pompeius (Pompey's sons). King Juba I of Numidia was a valuable local ally. After the pacification of the Eastern provinces, and a short visit to Rome, Caesar followed his opponents to Africa.

== African campaign leading up to Thapsus ==
Caesar had gathered six legions around Lilybaeum in Sicily. Four more legions were on their way from Rome. Despite the weather being far from optimal, Caesar embarked his six legions and sailed for Africa. He reached the African coast on 28 December, landing near Hadrumetum. However, a storm had scattered his transports, leaving him with just 3000 infantry and 150 cavalry. Hadrumetum was held by a strong Optimate garrison under Gaius Considius Longus and Gnaeus Calpurnius Piso. Caesar made camp south of the city and tried to negotiate with Considius, but the Optimate commander refused to read his message. Caesar launched several probing attacks on the city, but found out he had neither the men nor the materiel to take it. When his scouts reported that a large force of enemy cavalry was en route he decided to march south. The enemy cavalry force, mainly Numidian light cavalry, harassed his army all the way to Ruspina; they tried to pin Caesar's army in place, surround him, and then wear down his men and destroy his army just like they had done to Curio. Caesar was a much better and far more experienced commander than Curio and kept his forces moving using his cavalry to keep the Numidians at bay while his legionaries marched on to Ruspina. On 29 December Caesar reached Ruspina.

=== Ruspina ===
Caesar made Ruspina his base of operations. On January 1, he took some of his men and moved on to Leptis where he was joined by some of his scattered transports bringing much needed reinforcements. On January 4, Caesar marched out from Ruspina on a foraging expedition. He marched out with half his force; 9000 legionaries in 30 understrength cohorts. When his scouts reported the enemy was nearby he ordered his cavalry and archers to join him from Ruspina. Caesar then awaited the Optimate forces. A battle was fought; the Optimates, led by Petreius and Labienus, almost overcame Caesar's force, but in the end Caesar was able to extract his men and return to Ruspina.

Caesar decided to stay in camp around Ruspina, improve its defences and wait for more troops to arrive. The Optimates were gathering their forces near Hadrumetum; Scipio and the main army arrived bringing up their forces to 40,000 heavy infantry (about eight legions), a powerful cavalry force and many thousands of light infantry. Meanwhile, one of Caesar's admirals, Sallust, had captured a large Optimate grain supply on the Cercina islands and the XIII and XIV legions had arrived in Ruspina. With these reinforcements Caesar went on the offensive. He defeated the Optimates' Gallic and Germanic auxiliary cavalry in a skirmish near Ruspina; Labienus and the Optimates' right wing cavalry had charged some of Caesar's Spanish auxiliaries, but he had advanced too far from the main army. Caesar sent his left wing cavalry round to Labienus' rear catching him in a pincer. Labienus' Numidian cavalry was able to extract themselves, but his Gallic and Germanic horsemen were surrounded and slaughtered. In response the Optimates called on king Juba I of Numidia to join them with his army.

=== Uzitta ===
Caesar kept the initiative by marching on Uzitta, a major water source for the Optimates, and tried to force his enemy to do battle. Despite Juba's arrival, bringing his forces up to thirteen legions, Scipio refused to attack Caesar's positions. He tried to lure Caesar from his camp by torturing some of his captives, including the commander of the XIV legion, in front of Caesar's camp, but Caesar did not fall for the ruse. Two more veteran legions, the IX and X, arrived, bolstering Caesar's numbers. Caesar started building two long lines of fortifications from his camp to Uzitta. When they were finished he constructed a number of catapults and scorpions and started bombarding Uzitta. This caused some of the Optimates, mainly Gaetulians but also some legionaries from the Optimates' IV and VI legion, to change sides. Still the Optimates refused to do battle on Caesar's terms so he retreated back to Ruspina. Two more legions, the VII and VIII, arrived, bringing up his numbers to twelve legions. Supply problems forced Caesar to march his entire army south-west foraging. He sent his fleet under Cispius and Aquila to blockade Hadrumetum and Thapsus. Caesar foraged the area around Aggar and Zeta. The Optimates shadowed him with their army using their superior cavalry numbers to harass Caesar while foraging.

== Preliminary operations ==
In the beginning of February, Caesar arrived at Thapsus and besieged the city, surrounding it with a double line of circumvallation. His fleet had already arrived and was blockading Thapsus from the sea. Outside of the city was the Marsh of Moknine; leaving only two landward approaches to the city. Caesar blocked the southern approach with fortifications and defended these with three cohorts of troops. This forced his opponents to either attack the fortifications or march round the Marsh of Moknine and advance at his army via the eastern approach. The Optimates, led by Metellus Scipio, decided not to attack Caesar's southern fortifications, but march to the eastern approach. Scipio ordered Afranius and a few soldiers to take up positions opposite the fortifications and further ordered Juba and Labienus to camp their Numidian cavalry to the south of the marshes. The main army marched all the way to the eastern approach and started building a camp opposite Caesar's. To cover his workforce Scipio drew up the rest of his army in battle formation. Caesar knew that the Optimates' soldiers were tired from marching all day and drew up his well rested army to face them.

== Opposing forces ==
Caesar had twelve legions at Thapsus: five newly raised legions; Legio XXV, XXVI, XXVIII, XXIX and XXX, and seven veteran legions; Legio V, VII, VIII, IX, X, XIII and XIV. Caesar's veteran legions had been campaigning for many years and all of them were understrength. He also had a large number of archers, slingers and 3000–5000 cavalry. All in all Caesar had around 60,000–70,000 soldiers when he arrived at Thapsus.

The Optimates had eight Roman and three Numidian legions; around 55,000 legionaries. They also had 14,000–16,000 cavalry, c. 20,000 light infantry and 60 elephants. Their army totaled around 90,000 soldiers.

== Battle ==
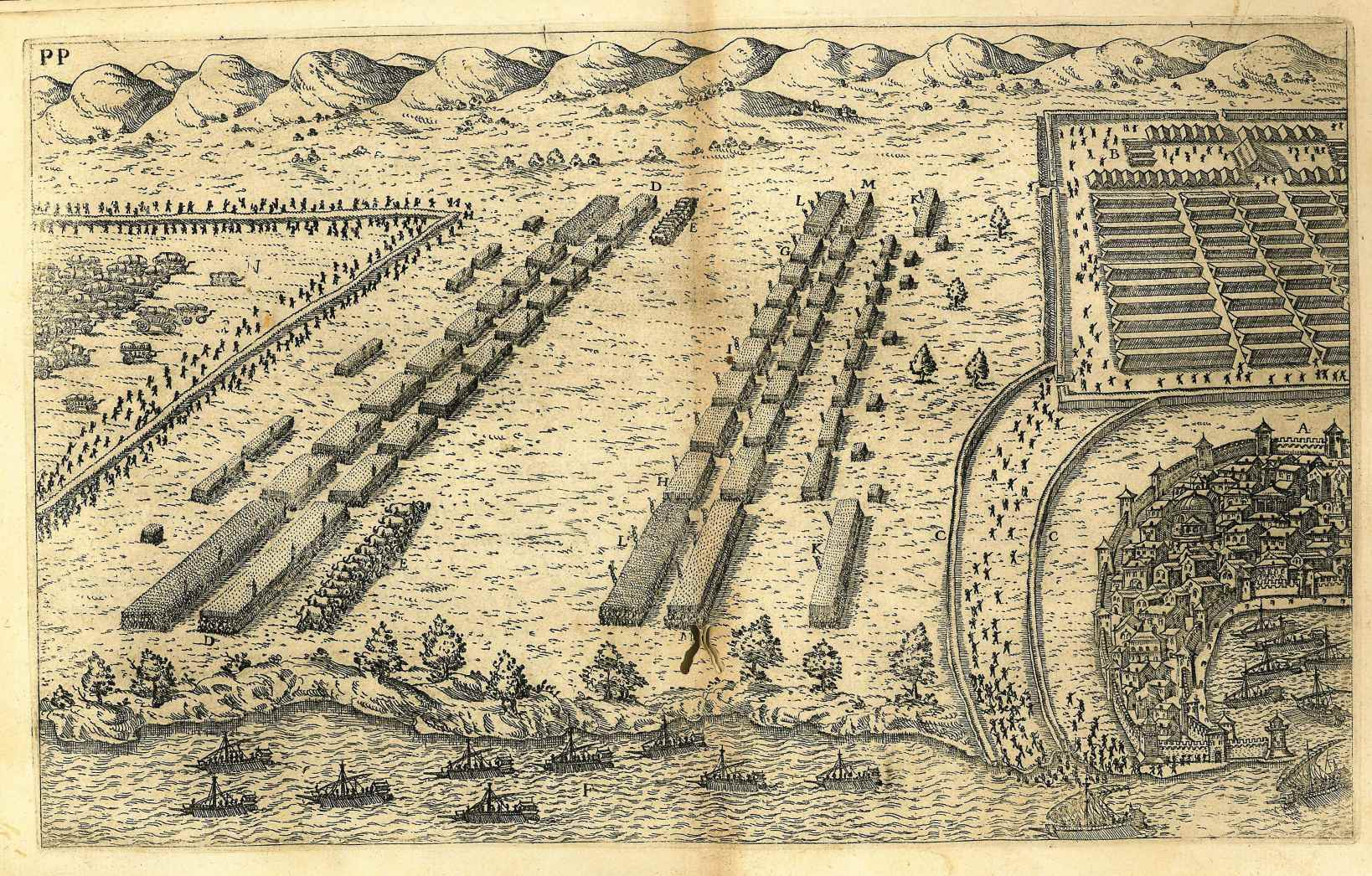
Scheme of the battle: 17th-century engraving after Palladio. The elephants are individually depicted.

Scipio had drawn up his legions in three lines in the centre with his cavalry and light infantry on the flanks. He put his elephants in front of the flanks. Caesar had left two recently recruited legions to continue the siege of the city. He had also drawn up his legions in three lines; Legio VII and X on the right, VIII and IX on the left, the XIII and XIV with three newly recruited legions in the centre (he had placed a recruit legion on either side of the XIII and XIV – mixing recruit and veteran legion was one of Caesar's trademarks), he had put his slingers, archers and the cavalry on the flanks, the V legion was split in two and kept as a reserve behind the flanks to counter the elephants. Caesar's position was typical of his style, with him commanding the right. The two armies faced each other waiting for one to move with neither side committing to battle for some time, Caesar's soldiers noticed something odd in the line up of the opposing legions, shifting nervously as troops moved out of the fortifications.

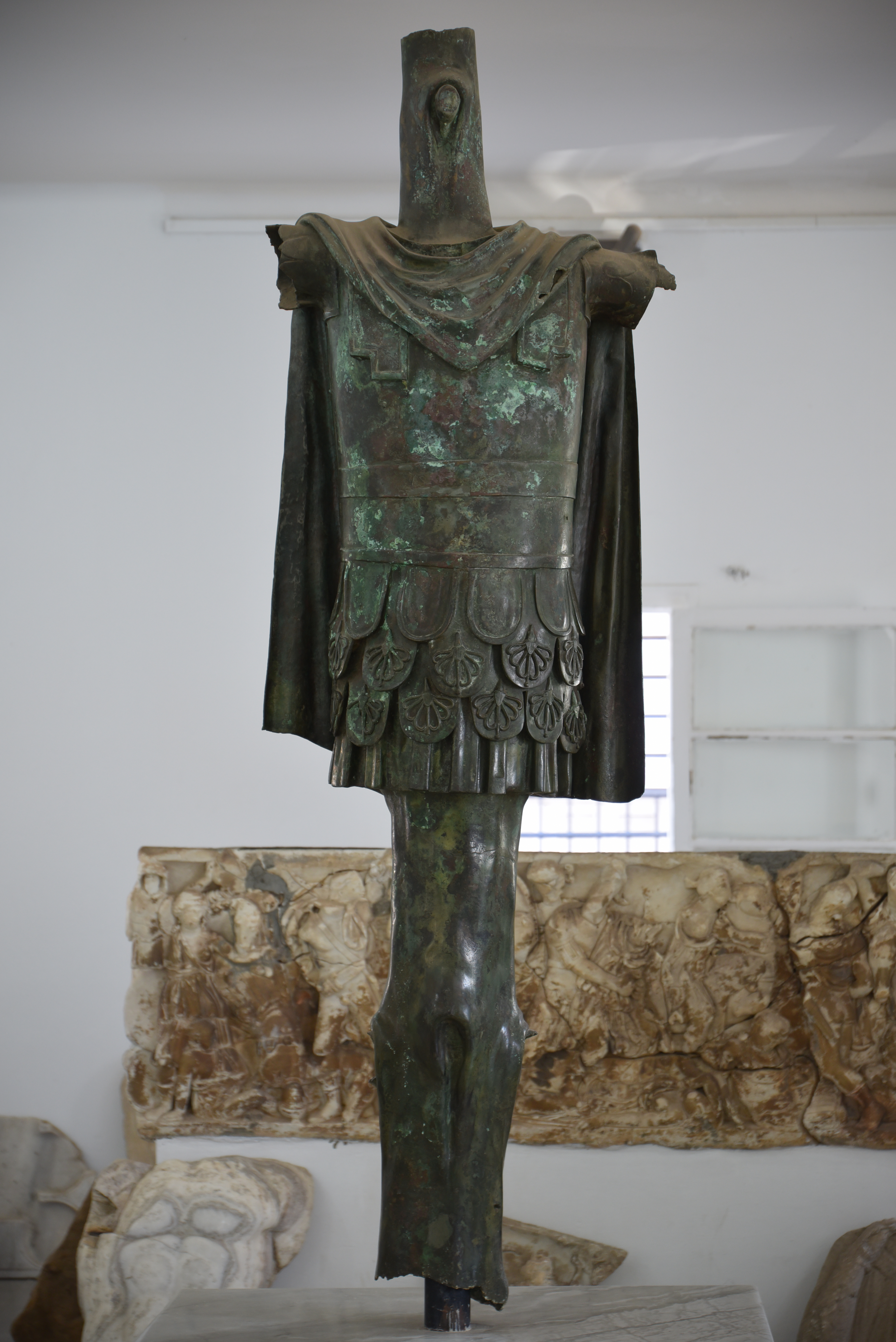
A Tropaion that may commemorate Caesar's victory over Juba I (Hippo Regius Museum).

A trumpeter of the VII sounded the attack and Caesar, seeing his right surge forward, ordered a general advance. Caesar's archers on the right flank attacked the elephants opposing them, causing them to panic and turn and trample their own men. The elephants on the other flank charged against Caesar's left flank. Caesar's light infantry and cavalry moved out of the elephants' path clearing their way to the detachment (five cohorts) of Legio V Alaudae which was placed behind the flank. The five cohorts sustained the charge with such bravery that afterwards the legion was awarded an elephant as a symbol. The legionaries of the fifth stabbed their pila at the elephants eyes and weak spots and blasted away on their trumpets frightening the beasts, causing them to turn back and run towards their own lines. They crashed into their own right flank. After the loss of the elephants, Metellus Scipio started to lose ground, his left broke first the rest followed. Caesar's cavalry outmaneuvered its enemy, destroyed the fortified camp, and forced its enemy into retreat. During the battle the garrison of Thapsus sallied out, attacking Caesar's siege works, but they were forced back by the two legions Caesar had left to continue the siege. Having done so these legionaries marched south to reinforce the troops fortified opposite Afranius and Juba's camp and together they attacked and overran Afranius' camp. They then prepared to attack the Numidians. Before they could do so Juba's allied troops abandoned the site and the battle was decided. Caesar proceeded to the Optimates' camp and found it already stormed. Here he lost control of his own men who started slaughtering their opponents.

Around ten thousand enemies were killed, those surviving the battle being put to the sword by the furious soldiers in spite of Caesar's repeated orders to spare them, which were ignored. Plutarch reports that according to some sources Caesar had an epileptic seizure just before he ordered his lines forward, causing confusion and orders to be disobeyed.

== Aftermath ==
Scipio, Labienus, Juba, Afranius and Petreius managed to escape from their defeat at the Battle of Thapsus. Labienus, with Sextus Pompeius and Varus, fled to Gnaeus Pompeius who was raising forces on the Iberian Peninsula. Afranius and Faustus Cornelius Sulla (Sulla's surviving son) collected several survivors and started to pillage eastern Mauretania (its king had sided with Caesar). They were caught by Publius Sittius (a Roman mercenary commander working for king Bocchus II, the king of eastern Mauretania, and an ally of Caesar) and were executed a few days later. Juba and Petreius fled to Numidia, but with Sittius closing in on them (Sittius had defeated the Numidian army under Suburra) they decided to commit suicide by dueling each other so they could die in an honorable way; Juba managed to kill Petreius in the duel and then had a slave kill him according to De Bello Africo, which is a Latin work continuing Julius Caesar's accounts of his campaigns against his Republican enemies in the province of Africa. Following the battle, Caesar renewed the siege of Thapsus, which eventually fell. He then proceeded to Utica, where Cato was garrisoned. On news of the defeat of his allies, Cato committed suicide. Caesar was upset by this and is reported by Plutarch to have said: "Cato, I must grudge you your death, as you grudged me the honour of saving your life." Scipio also tried to escape to Roman Hispania; he gathered a small fleet and the remaining Optimate leadership around him and set sail for the Iberian Peninsula. Bad weather forced them to return to the African coast, where they were caught off Hippo Regius by Sittius and his fleet. After losing the subsequent naval engagement Scipio also committed suicide by stabbing himself with his sword.

The battle preceded peace in Africa—Caesar pulled out and returned to Rome on July 25 of the same year. However, Caesar's opposition was not done yet; Titus Labienus, the sons of Pompey, Varus and several others managed to gather another army in Baetica in Hispania Ulterior. The civil war was not finished, and the Battle of Munda would soon follow. The Battle of Thapsus is generally regarded as marking the last large scale use of war elephants in the West.
