= Publius Attius Varus =

Roman politician and general (died 45 BC)

Publius Varus
- Died: 17 March 45 BC; Battle of Munda
- Cause of death: Killed in battle
- Occupations: Soldier and politician
- Office: Praetor (53 BC); Promagistrate; Propraetor (52 BC)
- Military career
- Allegiance: Pompey (49–45 BC)
- Branch: Roman army
- Rank: Propraetor
- Wars: Caesar's Civil War †; Battle of Utica; Battle of Thapsus; Battle of Carteia; Battle of Munda †

Publius Attius Varus (died 17 March 45 BC) was the Roman governor of Africa during the civil war between Julius Caesar and Pompey. He declared against Caesar, and initially fought Gaius Scribonius Curio, who was sent against him in 49 BC.

== Political career ==
Varus held the office of praetor no later than 53 BC. No record of his earlier political career survives. He was promagistrate, and likely propraetor, in Africa in 52 and possibly earlier.

== Role in civil war ==
On the outbreak of the civil war, Varus, an adherent of the optimates, was stationed in Picenum at the head of a considerable force. Upon the approach of Caesar, he was forced to evacuate the area. He and his levies joined Pompey in Apulia.

When Pompey left Italy for Greece, Varus crossed over into Africa, and took possession of his former province, which had been allotted to Q. Aelius Tubero for the purpose of obtaining grain. Excluded from his province by Varus, Tubero then went to join Pompey. Varus was well known in Africa from his earlier propraetorship, and was thus able to raise two legions.

=== The battle for Africa ===
Caesar sent Curio to Africa to take it away from the Pompeians. Curio was given command as a reward for his political support, but he had only limited military experience, and none at high command. He commanded legions that were initially recruited by the Pompeians but had switched allegiance at the surrender at Corfinium.

Curio successfully landed his forces near Utica, surprising Varus' army. One of Varus' officers, Sextus Quinctilius Varus, who had been at Corfinium, appealed to Curio's legions to desert and return to their original loyalty. The troops refused and, after a success in a cavalry skirmish, Curio led them in a bold, uphill attack which swiftly routed Varus's army. Encouraged by this success, Curio acted on what proved to be faulty intelligence, and attacked what he believed to be a detachment of Juba's army. In fact, the bulk of the king's forces were there and, after an initial success, Curio's forces were ambushed and virtually annihilated. Curio was surrounded with the remnants of his troops on a hilltop and died in the fighting. Only a small fraction of his army, including the historian Asinius Pollio and the later consul Gaius Caninius Rebilus, escaped to Sicily.

=== Aftermath ===
After the Battle of Pharsalus, the remaining Pompeians, including Cato, fled to Africa to continue the struggle. At Cato's insistence, Varus resigned the supreme command to the consular Metellus Scipio. The official rank of Varus from 48 BC was legatus pro praetore, as attested by inscriptional evidence.

In 46 BC, Varus was one of the commanders of the Pompeian fleet. After the defeat at the Battle of Thapsus, Varus fled to Hispania (Spain). There he was defeated at Carteia in a naval battle by Gaius Didius, who commanded Caesar's fleet, and forced to join the army on shore. He fell at the Battle of Munda. His head, together with that of Titus Labienus, was presented to Caesar.

== Sources ==
- Cicero, ad Att. viii. 13, b, 15, 20; pro Ligar. I.
- Julius Caesar, Commentarii de Bello Civili i. 12, 13, 31; ii. 23–44.
- Dion Cassius xli. 41, 42; xlii. 57, xliii. 30, 31.
- Appian, Bellum civile ii. 44–46; ii. 105.
- Lucan, Bellum civile (aka Pharsalia) iv. 713, foll.
- Aulus Hirtius, Bellum Afr. 62, 63.
