= Marcus Petreius =

Roman senator and general (110 BC – 46 BC)

- Born: 110 BC; Picenum, Italy
- Died: April 46 BC (aged 64); Numidia, near Cirta (modern Constantine, Algeria)
- Cause of death: Killed in duel
- Occupation: General
- Office: Praetor (64 BC); Military Tribune; Prefect; Legate
- Father: Gaius Petreius

Military service
- Allegiance: Roman Republic; Sulla; Pompey
- Rank: Legate
- Battles/wars: Social War; Sulla's civil war; Sertorian War; Second Catilinarian Conspiracy; Battle of Pistoia; Caesar's Civil War †; Battle of Ilerda; Siege of Dyrrhachium; Battle of Pharsalus; Battle of Ruspina (WIA); Battle of Thapsus

Marcus Petreius (110 BC – April 46 BC) was a Roman politician and general. He was a client of Pompey and like Pompey he came from Picenum a region in eastern Italy. He cornered and killed the notorious rebel Catiline at Pistoia.

== Career ==
The chronology of the early stages of Petreius’ career is unclear. He was in any case the first in his family line to enter into the Senate. Sallust describes him as a military man, who in 62 BC already had a thirty-year-long career in the army as Military tribune, Prefect and Legate behind him. Petreius served at the latest in 64 BC as Praetor, although the exact year he took on this position is unknown.

Petreius first served under Pompeius Strabo during the Social War (91-87 BC). In 76–71 BC he served Pompey as a Legate in Spain fighting Sertorius. In 63/62 BC he served as Legate under the Consul Gaius Antonius Hybrida. He led the Senatorial forces in the victory over the revolutionary Lucius Sergius Catilina at Pistoria in early 62 BC, while Hybrida remained away from the battle with a foot ache. During Gaius Julius Caesar's Consulship of 59 BC, Marcus Petreius allied himself with Caesar's bitter opponent Marcus Porcius Cato (the Younger).

From 55 BC, Petreius and Lucius Afranius administered the Spanish provinces as Legates, while the official governor Gnaeus Pompeius Magnus remained in Rome. After the outbreak of the Civil War in 49 BC, Petreius and Afranius marched against Caesar, who for his part wished to secure Spain before moving against Pompey in Greece. The two Legates suffered defeat after initial successes, and were forced to capitulate and disband their army on August 2 at Ilerda. Caesar allowed Petreius and Afranius their freedom, and the two travelled to Greece to join Pompey's forces. After Pompey's defeat in the Battle of Pharsalus, Petreius and Cato fled from the Peloponnese to North Africa, where the former continued to serve as Legate in the resistance to Caesar. Together with Titus Labienus, Petreius again achieved several successes against Caesar. After the defeat of the Pompeians at Thapsus, Petreius fled with the Numidian King, Juba. As they realized the hopelessness of their situation, Petreius and Juba resolved to take their lives on an estate near Zama: Petreius and Juba decided upon a duel. The accounts of their deaths differ, though according to the most likely version, one of the two killed the other; the survivor tried to stab himself with his sword and, failing to do so, had himself killed by a slave.
