= Juba I of Numidia =

King of Numidia (85–46 BC)

Juba I
- Agellid
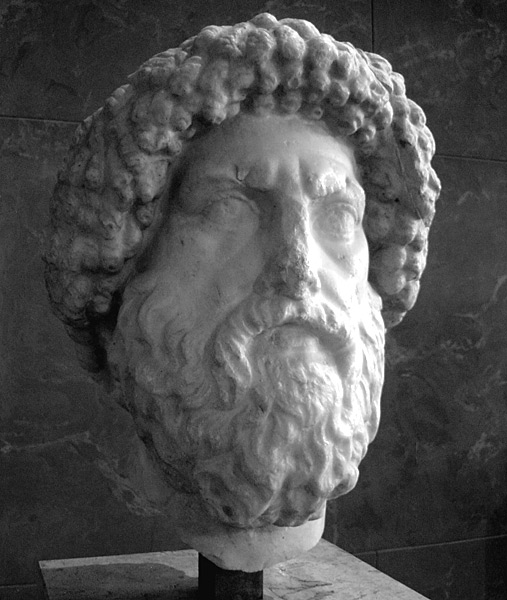
- Roman marble bust of Juba I from Cherchell, Algeria. Louvre Museum

King of Numidia
- Reign: 60–46 BC
- Predecessor: Hiempsal II
- Successor: Interregnum; Eventually Juba II
- Born: c. 85 BC; Hippone, Annaba (Algeria)
- Died: 46 BC (aged 39); Numidia
- Issue: King Juba II
- Berber: ⵢⵓⴱⴰ (Yuba)
- Father: Hiempsal II

Juba I of Numidia (Latin: Iuba, Punic: ywbʿy; c. 85–46 BC) was a king of Numidia (present-day Algeria) who reigned from 60 to 46 BC. He was the son and successor to Hiempsal II.

== Biography ==
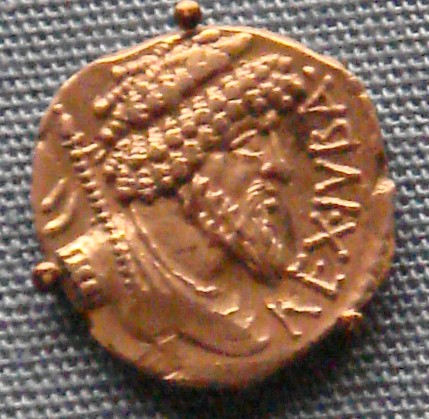
Juba I's denarius in support of Pompey against Julius Caesar, 60-46 BC. The legend reads REX.IVBA "King Juba". British Museum

Juba I was an Amazigh prince from Numidia, born in Hippone (modern-day Annaba, Algeria). In 81 BC, Hiempsal had been driven from his throne; soon afterwards, Pompey was sent to Africa by Sulla to reinstate him as king in Numidia, and because of this Hiempsal and later Juba became Pompey's allies. This alliance was strengthened during a visit by Juba to Rome when Julius Caesar insulted him by pulling on his beard during a trial wherein Caesar was defending his client against Juba's father and still further in 50 BC when the tribune Gaius Scribonius Curio openly proposed that Numidia should be sold privately.

In August 49 BC, Caesar sent Curio to take Africa from the Republicans. Curio was overconfident and held Publius Attius Varus (Varus), the governor of Africa, in low esteem. Curio took fewer legions than he had been given. In the Battle of the Bagradas the same year, Curio led his army in a bold, uphill attack which swiftly routed Varus's army and wounded Varus. Encouraged by this success, Curio acted on what proved to be faulty intelligence and attacked what he believed to be a detachment of Juba's army. In fact, the bulk of the king's forces were there and, after an initial success, Curio's forces were ambushed and virtually annihilated by Saburra (Juba's military commander). Curio was surrounded with the remnants of his troops on a hilltop and died in the fighting. Only a few escaped on their ships, and King Juba took several senators captive back to Numidia for display and execution.

With the arrival of Caesar in Africa, Juba originally planned to join Quintus Caecilius Metellus Pius Scipio Nasica, but his kingdom was invaded from the west by Caesar's ally Bocchus II and an Italian adventurer, Publius Sittius. He therefore left only 30 elephants behind and marched home to save his country.

Scipio knew he could not fight without more troops and sent a desperate message to Juba for assistance. Juba immediately left the command of his kingdom's defence with Saburra and joined Scipio with three legions, approximately 15,000 light infantry, 1,000 cavalry, and 30 elephants for the Battle of Thapsus. However, he camped away from Scipio's main lines. Seeing the certain defeat of Scipio's army, Juba did not take part in the battle and fled with his 30,000 men. Having fled with the Roman general Marcus Petreius and finding their retreat cut off, they made a suicide pact and engaged in one on one combat. The idea was that one would meet an honourable death. The accounts of their deaths differ, though according to the most likely version, one of the two killed the other; the survivor tried to stab himself with his sword and, failing to do so, had himself killed by a slave.

== Family ==
Juba I was the father of King of Numidia and later Mauretania, Juba II (50/52 BC – AD 23), father-in-law of Juba II's wives Greek Ptolemaic princess Cleopatra Selene II (40 BC – 6 BC) and Cappadocian princess Glaphyra, and paternal grandfather to King Ptolemy of Mauretania.

Coin of Juba I.
