= Quintus Caecilius Metellus Pius Scipio =

1st century BC Roman politician and general

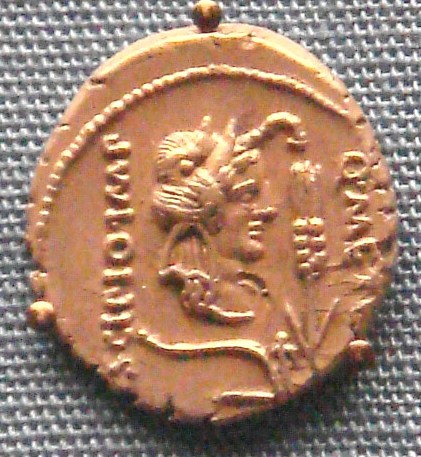
- Denarius of Metellus Scipio with elephant-skin headgear to represent African imperium (47-46 BC)
- Born: Publius Cornelius Scipio Nasica c. 95 BC
- Died: 46 BC; Hippo Regius, Numidia
- Cause of death: Suicide
- Occupations: Politician and General
- Office: Tribune of the Plebs (59 BC); Curule Aedile(57 BC); Praetor (55 BC); Interrex (53 BC); Consul (52 BC)
- Spouse: Aemilia Lepida
- Children: Metellus Scipio; Cornelia Metella
- Parent: Publius Cornelius Scipio Nasica (praetor 93 BC)
- Military career
- Allegiance: Roman Republic; Pompey (49–46 BC)
- Branch: Roman army
- Rank: Legate
- Wars: Caesar's civil war; Battle of Pharsalus; Battle of Thapsus; Battle of Hippo Regius †

Quintus Caecilius Metellus Pius Scipio (c. 95 – 46 BC), often referred to as Metellus Scipio, was a Roman politician and military commander. Ronald Syme called him "the last Scipio of any consequence in Roman history."

He was born a member of the patrician Cornelii Scipiones family and initially named Publius Cornelius Scipio Nasica after his father. After reaching adulthood, he was adopted into the plebeian Caecilii Metelli family, taking his unusually complex final name.

He was a member of the Roman Senate and held the series of increasingly powerful offices that formed the cursus honorum, culminating in the consulship of 52 BC. As an aristocratic and conservative politician, he opposed the populist policies of the First Triumvirate.

During Caesar's civil war, he supported the senatorial faction led by Pompey against Julius Caesar. He used his position as proconsul of the province of Syria to raise troops for the war, then commanded them in subsequent actions. Metellus Scipio led the centre at the Battle of Pharsalus and was overall commander at the Battle of Thapsus, both defeats. Fleeing across the sea after Thapsus, he was caught at the naval Battle of Hippo Regius. Facing imminent capture, he killed himself with a stoicism that was later commended by Seneca the Younger.

== Family connections and name ==
The son of Publius Cornelius Scipio Nasica, praetor about 93 BC, and Licinia, Scipio was the grandson of Publius Cornelius Scipio Nasica, consul in 111, and Lucius Licinius Crassus, consul in 95. His great-grandfather was Scipio Nasica Serapio, the man who murdered Tiberius Gracchus in 133 BC. Through his mother Cornelia, Serapio was also the grandson of Scipio Africanus. Scipio's father died not long after his praetorship, and was survived by two sons and two daughters. The brother was adopted by their grandfather Crassus, but left little mark on history.

Publius Scipio, as he was referred to in contemporary sources early in his life, was adopted in adulthood through the testament of Quintus Caecilius Metellus Pius, consul in 80 BC and pontifex maximus. He retained his patrician status: "Scipio's ancestry," notes Syme, "was unmatched for splendour." As Jerzy Linderski has shown at length, this legal process constitutes adoption only in a loose sense; Scipio becomes a Caecilius Metellus in name while inheriting the estate of Metellus Pius, but was never his "son" while the pontifex maximus was alive. He was sometimes called "Metellus Scipio", or just "Scipio", after his adoption. A decree of the senate gave his official name as "Q. Caecilius Q. f. Fab. Metellus Scipio."

Scipio married Aemilia Lepida, daughter of Mamercus Aemilius Lepidus Livianus, consul in 77 BC, but was not without rival in seeking to marry Aemilia Lepida. The virginal Cato had also wanted to marry Aemilia but lost out:

When [Cato] thought that he was old enough to marry, and up to that time he had consorted with no woman, he engaged himself to Lepida, who had formerly been betrothed to Metellus Scipio, but was now free, since Scipio had rejected her and the betrothal had been broken. However, before the marriage Scipio changed his mind again, and by dint of every effort got the maid. Cato was greatly exasperated and inflamed by this, and attempted to go to law about it; but his friends prevented this, and so, in his rage and youthful fervour, he betook himself to iambic verse, and heaped much scornful abuse upon Scipio … .

The couple had one son, a Metellus Scipio who seems to have died when he was only 18. Another son may have been born around 70 BC, or a son may have been adopted. The couple's much more famous daughter was born around that time as well. Scipio first married off the celebrated Cornelia Metella to Publius Crassus, the son of Marcus Licinius Crassus. After Publius's death at Carrhae, Scipio decided to succeed Caesar as the father-in-law of Pompey, and approached Pompey with an offer to marry him to Cornelia, which Pompey accepted. Pompey was at least thirty years older than Cornelia. This marriage was one of the acts by which Pompey severed his alliance to Caesar and declared himself the champion of the optimates. He and Scipio were consuls together in 52.

== Political career ==
Cicero names "P. Scipio" among the young nobiles on his defence team when Sextus Roscius was prosecuted in 80 BC. He is placed in the company of Marcus Messalla and Metellus Celer, both future consuls.

Metellus Scipio was probably tribune of the plebs in 59 BC, but this office was usually forbidden to those with patrician status. It is possible that Scipio's adoption into a plebeian gens may have qualified him for a tribunate on a technicality. He may have been aedile in 57 BC though this is not certain; one of the responsibilities of the aediles was organising games and he is known to have presented funeral games that year, in honour of his adopted father (who had died six years earlier).

He was praetor, most likely in 55 BC during the second consulship of Pompey and Marcus Crassus. In 53 BC, Scipio was briefly interrex with Marcus Valerius Messalla. Because only a patrician could be interrex, the holding of this office is incompatible with him having been a plebeian tribune. He became consul with Pompeius in 52 BC, the year he arranged the marriage of his newly widowed daughter to him.

Indisputably aristocratic and conservative, Metellus Scipio had been at least a symbolic counterweight to the power of the so-called triumvirate before the death of Crassus in 53 BC. "Opportune deaths," notes Syme, "had enhanced his value, none remaining now of the Metellan consuls."

He is known to have been a member of the College of Pontiffs by 57 BC, and was probably nominated upon the death of his adoptive father in 63, and subsequently elected.

== Role in civil war ==
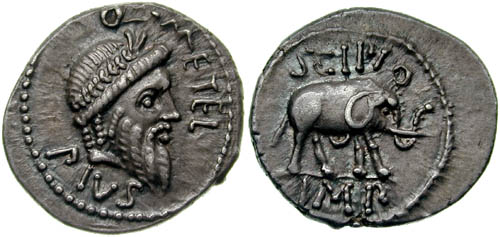
Denarius issued by Metellus Scipio as Imperator in North Africa, 47–46 BC, depicting Jupiter and on the reverse an elephant

In January of 49 BC, Scipio persuaded the Roman Senate to issue the ultimatum to Caesar that made war inevitable. That same year, Scipio became proconsul of the province of Syria. In Syria and Asia, where he took up winter quarters, he used often oppressive means to gather ships, troops, and money:

He put a per capita tax on slaves and children; he taxed columns, doors, grain, soldiers, weaponry, oarsmen, and machinery; if a name could be found for a thing, that was seen as sufficient for making money from it.

Scipio put to death Alexander of Judaea, and was acclaimed Imperator for claimed victories in the Amanus Mountains — as noted disparagingly by Caesar.

In 48 BC, Scipio brought his forces from Asia to Greece, where he manoeuvred against Gnaeus Domitius Calvinus and Lucius Cassius until the arrival of Pompeius. At the Battle of Pharsalus, he commanded the centre. After the optimates' defeat by Caesar, Metellus fled to Africa. With the support of his former rival-in-romance Cato, he wrested the chief command of Pompeius' forces from the loyal Publius Attius Varus, probably in early 47. In 46, he held command at the Battle of Thapsus, "without skill or success," and was defeated along with Cato.

== Death ==
After the defeat, he tried to escape to the Iberian Peninsula to continue the fight, but was cornered by the fleet of Publius Sittius. To avoid capture by his enemies, he killed himself by stabbing with his sword.

Facing death, Metellus Scipio achieved an uncharacteristic dignity, famously departing from his soldiers with a nonchalant "Imperator se bene habet" ("Your general's just fine"). These last words elicited strong praise from the Stoic moral philosopher Seneca the Younger:

Take, for example, Scipio, the father-in-law of Gnaeus Pompeius: he was driven back upon the African coast by a head-wind and saw his ship in the power of the enemy. He therefore pierced his body with a sword; and when they asked where the commander was, he replied: 'All is well with the commander.' These words brought him up to the level of his ancestors and suffered not the glory which fate gave to the Scipios in Africa to lose its continuity. It was a great deed to conquer Carthage, but a greater deed to conquer death. 'All is well with the commander!' Ought a general to die otherwise, especially one of Cato's generals?

== Assessment ==
Classical scholar John H. Collins summed up the character and reputation of Metellus Scipio:

From all that can be learned of this Scipio, he was as personally despicable and as politically reactionary as they come: a defender of C. Verres (In Ver. II. 4. 79–81), a debauchee of singular repulsiveness (Valerius Maximus, 9.1.8), an incompetent and bull-headed commander (Plutarch, Cato Min. 58), an undisciplined tyrant in the possession of authority (Bell. Afr. 44–46), an extortioner of the provinces (BC 3.31–33), a proscription-thirsty bankrupt (Att. 9.11), a worthy great grandson des hochmütigen, plebejerfeindlichen Junkers (Münzer, RE 4.1502) who had led the lynching of Tiberius Gracchus, and a most unworthy father of the gentle Cornelia. Only in the Imperator se bene habet with which he met death is there any trace of the nobler character of his great forebears (Seneca Rhet., Suas. 7.8).

== See also ==
- Caecilia gens

== Selected bibliography ==
- Linderski, Jerzy. "Q. Scipio Imperator." In Imperium sine fine: T. Robert S. Broughton and the Roman Republic. Franz Steiner, 1996, pp. 144–185. Limited preview online.
- Syme, Ronald. "The Last Scipiones." In The Augustan Aristocracy. Oxford University Press, 1989, pp. 244–245 online.

Political offices
Preceded by Gn. Domitius Calvinus; M. Valerius Messalla Rufus	Roman consul 52 BC; With: Pompey	Succeeded by Ser. Sulpicius Rufus; M. Claudius Marcellus
