= African War =

African War may refer to:

- Hispano-Moroccan War (1859–1860), fought between Spain and Morocco from October 1859 until April 1860
- a phase of Caesar's civil war, see Caesar's civil war#African campaign
- De Bello Africo, Caesar's account of the African War
- Several of the wars in list of conflicts in Africa
