= Nipperdey =

Nipperdey is a surname. Notable people with the surname include:

- Carl Nipperdey (1821–1875), German classical philologist
- Dorothee Sölle (née Nipperdey; 1929–2003), German liberation theologian
- Hans Carl Nipperdey (1895–1968), German labour law expert
- Thomas Nipperdey (1927–1994), German historian
