= Commentarii de Bello Gallico =

Account of Gallic wars by Julius Caesar

Commentarii de Bello Gallico (Commentaries on the Gallic War)
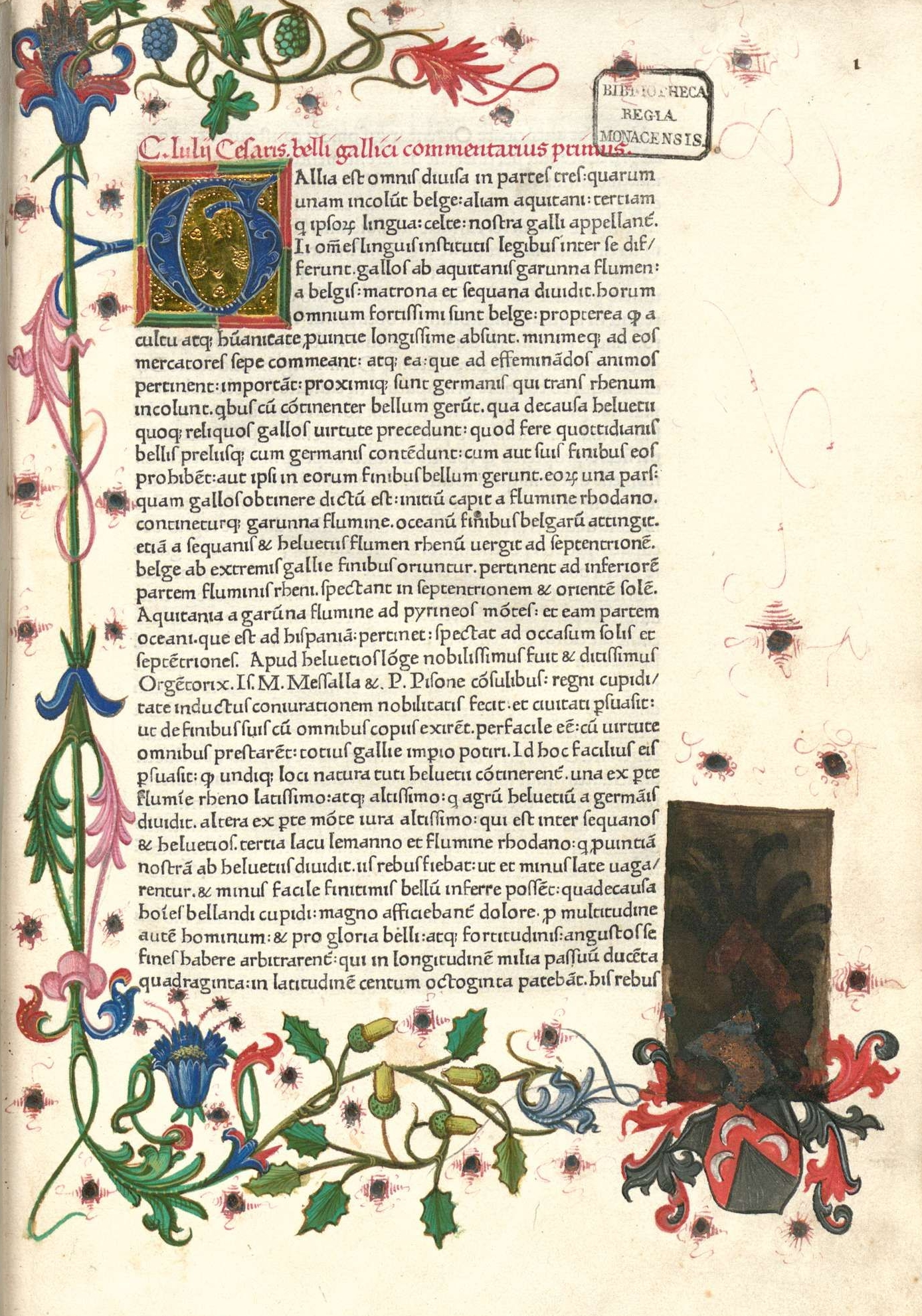
- First page of De bello Gallico, from the editio princeps of Sweynheym and Pannartz, Rome, 1469
- Author: Julius Caesar (books 1–7), Aulus Hirtius (book 8)
- Language: Classical Latin
- Subject: History, ethnography, military history
- Publisher: Julius Caesar
- Publication date: 58–49 BC
- Followed by: Commentarii de Bello Civili

Commentarii de Bello Gallico (Classical Latin: [kɔm.mɛnˈtaː.ɾi.iː deː ˈbɛl.loː ˈɡal.lɪ.koː]; English: Commentaries on the Gallic War), also Bellum Gallicum (English: Gallic War), is Julius Caesar's first-hand account of the Gallic Wars, written as a third-person narrative. In it, Caesar describes the battles and intrigues that took place in the nine years he spent fighting the Celtic and Germanic peoples in Gaul who opposed Roman conquest.

The "Gaul" to which Caesar refers is ambiguous, as the term had various connotations in Roman writing and discourse during Caesar's time. Generally, Gaul included all of the regions primarily inhabited by Celts, aside from the province of Gallia Narbonensis (modern-day Provence and Occitania), which had already been conquered in Caesar's time, therefore encompassing the rest of modern France, Belgium, Western Germany, and parts of Switzerland. As the Roman Republic made inroads deeper into Celtic territory and conquered more land, the definition of "Gaul" shifted. Concurrently, "Gaul" was also used in common parlance as a synonym for "uncouth" or "unsophisticated", as Romans saw Celtic peoples as uncivilized compared with themselves. (Note: For example, Caesar called northern Gaul Gallia Comata or "long-haired Gaul", as opposed to Gallia Narbonensis or Provincia, the Roman province in Southern Gaul, where the inhabitants had been "civilised" enough to cut their hair.)

Commentarii de Bello Gallico has long been a mainstay in Latin instruction due to its simple, direct prose. It begins with the frequently quoted phrase Gallia est omnis divisa in partes tres, meaning "Gaul is a whole divided into three parts". The full work is split into eight sections, Book 1 to Book 8, varying in size from approximately 5,000 to 15,000 words. Book 8 was written by Aulus Hirtius, after Caesar's death.

Although most contemporaries and subsequent historians considered the account truthful, 20th-century historians have questioned the outlandish claims made in the work. Of particular note are Caesar's claims that the Romans fought Gallic forces of up to 430,000 (a size believed to be impossible for an army at that time), and that the Romans suffered no deaths against this incredibly large force.

== Title ==
The Latin title, Commentaries on the Gallic War, is often retained in English translations of the book, and the title is also translated to About the Gallic War, Of the Gallic War, On the Gallic War, The Conquest of Gaul, and The Gallic War.

== Motivations ==
The victories in Gaul won by Caesar had increased the alarm and hostility of his enemies at Rome, and his aristocratic enemies, the optimates, were spreading rumors about his intentions once he returned from Gaul. The optimates intended to prosecute Caesar for abuse of his authority upon his return, when he would lay down his imperium. Such prosecution would not only see Caesar stripped of his wealth and citizenship, but also negate all of the laws he enacted during his term as consul and his dispositions as pro-consul of Gaul.

To defend himself against these threats, Caesar knew he needed the support of the plebeians, particularly the Tribunes of the Plebs, on whom he chiefly relied for help in carrying out his agenda. The Commentaries were an effort by Caesar to directly communicate with the plebeians – thereby circumventing the usual channels of communication that passed through the Senate – to propagandize his activities as efforts to increase the glory and influence of Rome. By winning the support of the people, Caesar sought to make himself unassailable from the boni. His argument was that the Gallic Wars were both just and pious, and that he and his army attacked Gaul in self-defense. By creating an account that portrays himself as a superb military hero, Caesar was able to clear all doubts in Rome about his abilities as a leader.

== Synopsis ==
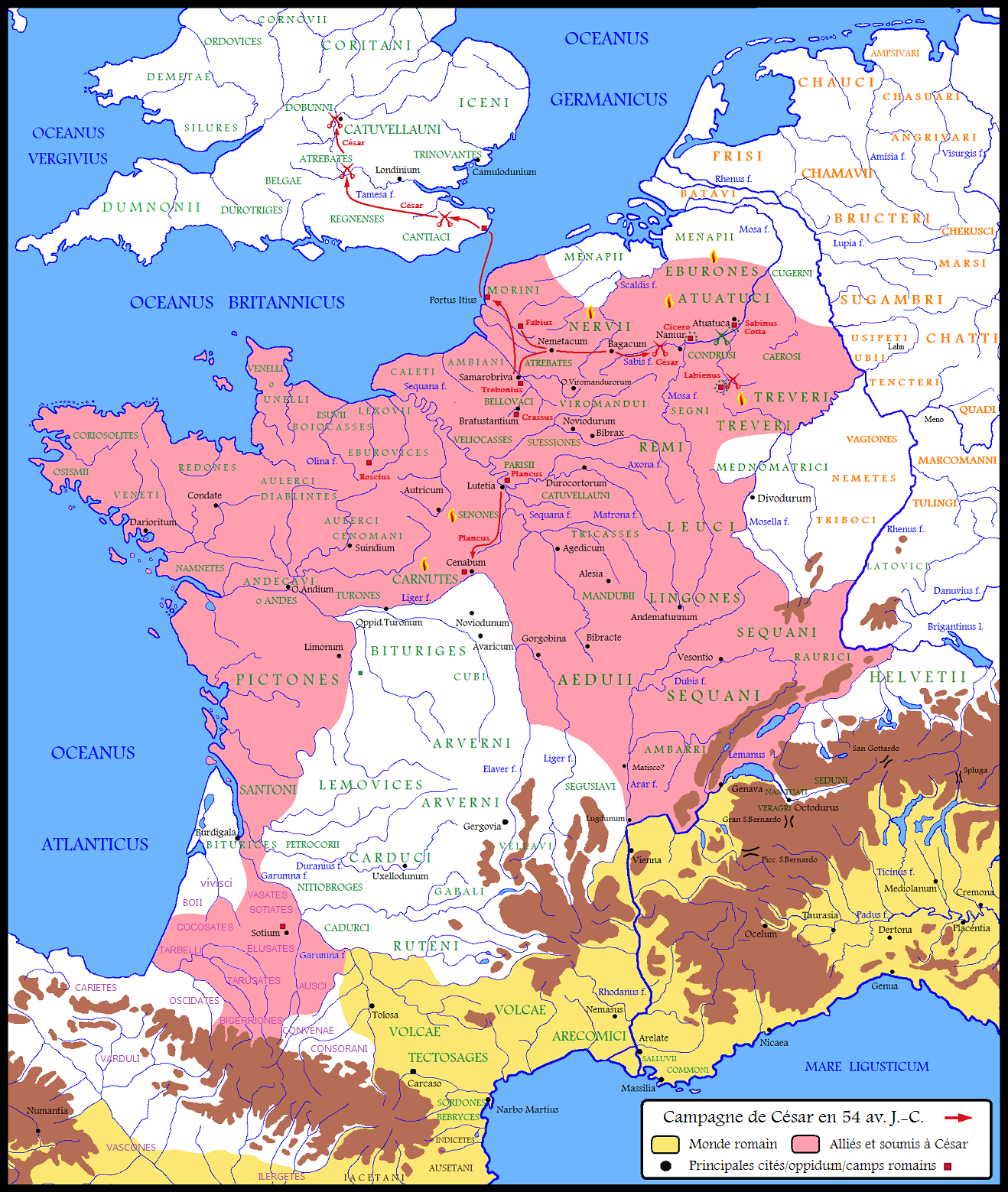
Ethnographic map of Gaul during Julius Caesar's campaign (54 BC)

The Commentarii covers the Gallic Wars over a period of eight years, beginning with conflict over the migration of the Helvetii in 58 BC. The Helvetians were forming a massive migration straight through the provinces. When a group of neighboring allies came to Caesar himself asking for help against these invading Helvetians, that was all the justification Caesar needed to gather his army. This drew in neighboring tribes and the Germanic Suebi.

By 57 BC, Caesar had resolved to conquer all of Gaul, and led campaigns in the east, where the Nervii nearly defeated him. In 56 BC, Caesar defeated the Veneti in a naval battle and took most of northwest Gaul. In 55 BC, Caesar sought to boost his public image, and undertook expeditions across the Rhine river and the English Channel that were the first of their kind. Upon his return from Britain, Caesar was hailed as a hero, though he had achieved little beyond landing because his army had been too small and he was unable to land his cavalry. The next year, he went back with a larger army, including cavalry, and was more successful, setting up a friendly king and bringing his rival to terms. However, tribes rose up on the continent, and the Romans suffered a humiliating defeat. 53 BC saw a draconian campaign against the Gauls in an attempt to pacify them. This failed, and the Gauls staged a mass revolt under the leadership of Vercingetorix in 52 BC. Gallic forces won a notable victory at the Battle of Gergovia, but the Romans' indomitable siege works at the Battle of Alesia utterly defeated the Gallic coalition.

In 51 BC and 50 BC, there was little resistance, and Caesar's troops were mostly mopping up. Gaul was conquered, although it would not become a Roman province until 27 BC, and resistance would continue until as late as 70 AD. There is no clear end-date for the war, but the imminent Roman Civil War led to the withdrawal of Caesar's troops in 50 BC. Caesar's wild successes in the war had made him extremely wealthy and provided a legendary reputation. The Gallic Wars were a key factor in Caesar's ability to win the Civil War and declare himself dictator, in what would eventually lead to the end of the Roman Republic and the establishment of the Roman Empire.

== Motifs and peoples in the De Bello Gallico ==
=== Leaders of the Gallic tribes ===
In the Commentarii de Bello Gallico, Caesar mentions several leaders of the Gallic tribes. Among these, Diviciacus and Vercingetorix are notable for their contributions to the Gauls during war.

==== Diviciacus ====
Books 1 and 6 detail the importance of Diviciacus, a leader of the Haedui (Aedui), which lies mainly in the friendly relationship between Caesar and Diviciacus, said to be "the one person in whom Caesar had absolute confidence" (1.41). His brother, Dumnorix had committed several acts against the Romans because he wanted to become king (1.18); thus Caesar was able to make his alliance with Diviciacus even stronger by sparing Dumnorix from punishment while also forcing Diviciacus to control his own brother. Diviciacus had, in tears, begged Caesar to spare the life of his brother, and Caesar saw an opportunity to not only fix his major problem with Dumnorix, but also to strengthen the relationship between Rome and one of its small allies. Another major action taken by Diviciacus was his imploring of Caesar to take action against the Germans and their leader, Ariovistus. His fear of Ariovistus and the general outcry from the Gallic people led Caesar to launch a campaign against the Germans, even though they had been considered friends of the Republic.

==== Vercingetorix ====
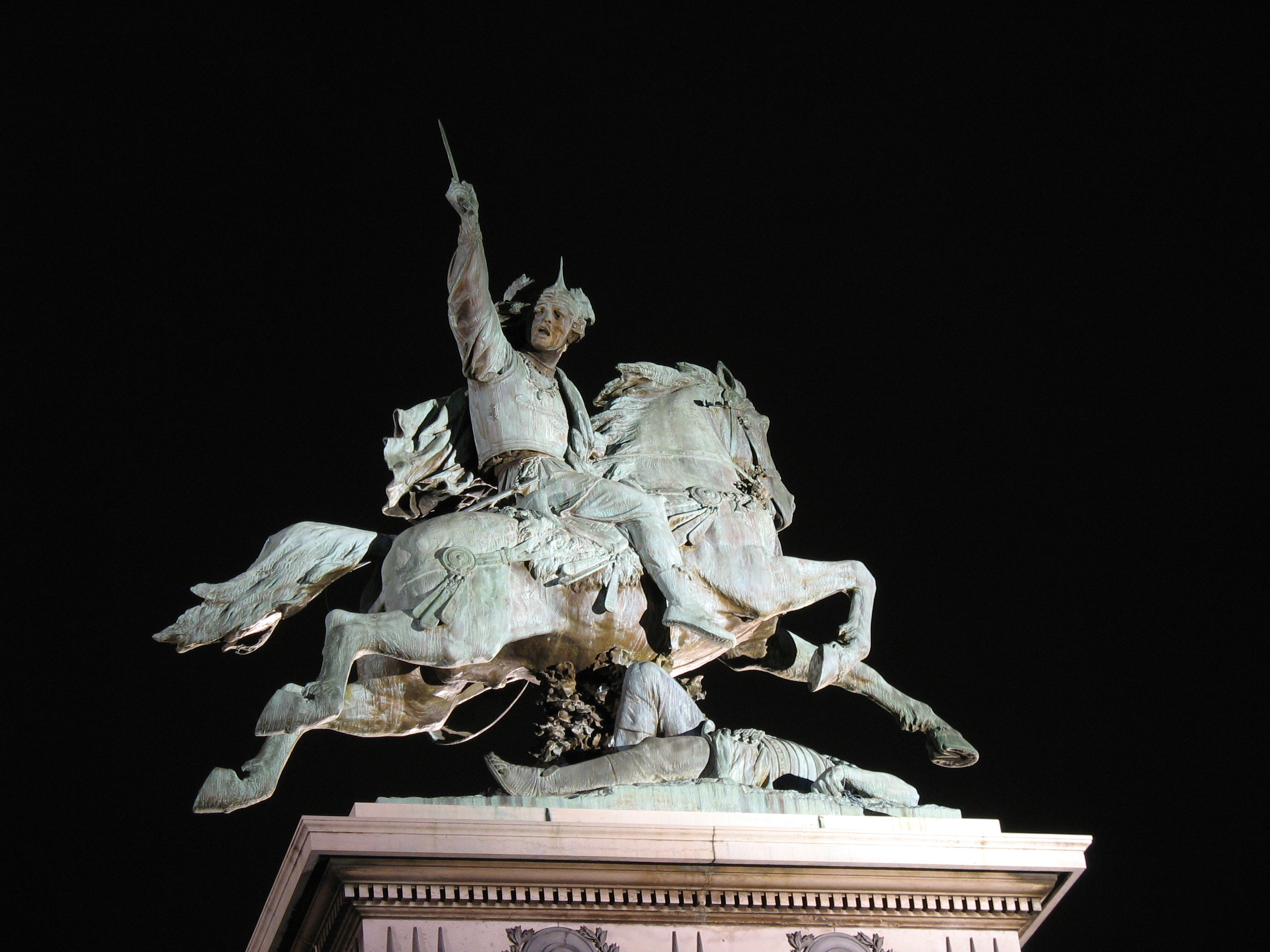
Statue of Vercingetorix, erected in 1903 in Clermont-Ferrand, France

Vercingetorix, leader of the Arverni, united the Gallic tribes against Caesar during the winter of 53–52 BC. This appears in Book VII, chapters 1–13. Vercingetorix's father, Celtillus, was killed after attempting to seize power amongst the Arverni; for that reason, Vercingetorix was a social outcast and had much to gain from a rebellion. When it was clear that Caesar had defeated the Gallic rebellion, Vercingetorix offered to sacrifice himself, and put himself at the mercy of Caesar, in order to ensure that his kinsmen were spared. After the defeat, Vercingetorix was brought to Rome and imprisoned for six years before being brought out to adorn Caesar's triumph over Gaul and then publicly executed. Today, Vercingetorix is seen in the same light as others who opposed Roman conquest; he is now considered a national hero in France and a model patriot.

=== The Germanic peoples ===
In De Bello Gallico 6.21–28, Julius Caesar provides his audience with a picture of Germanic lifestyle and culture. He depicts the Germans as primitive hunter gatherers with diets mostly consisting of meat and dairy products who only celebrate earthly gods such as the sun, fire, and the moon (6.21–22). German women reportedly wear small cloaks of deer hides and bathe in the river naked with their fellow men, yet their culture celebrates men who abstain from sex for as long as possible (6.21). Caesar concludes in chapters 25–28 by describing the Germans living in the almost-mythological Hercynian Forest full of oxen with horns in the middle of their foreheads, elks without joints or ligatures, and uri who kill every man they come across.

However, the distinguishing characteristic of the Germans for Caesar, as described in chapters 23 and 24, is their warring nature, which they believe is a sign of true valour (6.23). The Germans have no neighbors, because they have driven everyone out from their surrounding territory (6.23). Their greatest political power resides in the wartime magistrates, who have power over life and death (6.23). While Caesar certainly respects the warring instincts of the Germans, he directs his readers to see that their cultures are simply too barbaric, especially when contrasted with the high-class Gallic Druids described at the beginning of chapter six. For example, Caesar writes that robberies committed outside of the state are legalized in hopes of teaching young people discipline and caution, an idea nearly offensive to the judicial practices of the Romans (6.23). Caesar's generalizations, alongside the writings of Tacitus, form the barbaric identity of the Germans for the ancient world.

=== The Druids ===
Caesar's account of the Druids and the "superstitions" of the Gallic nations are documented in Book 6, chapters 13, 14 and 16–18 of De Bello Gallico. In chapter 13, he mentions the importance of Druids in the culture and social structure of Gaul at the time of his conquest. Chapter 14 addresses the education of the Druids and the high social standing that comes with their position. He first comments on the role of sacrificial practices in their daily lives in chapter 16. Caesar highlights the sacrificial practices of the Druids containing innocent people and the large sacrificial ceremony where hundreds of people were burnt alive at one time to protect the whole from famine, plague, and war (6.16). Chapter 17 and 18 focuses on the divinities the Gauls believed in and Dis, the god which they claim they were descended from. This account of the Druids highlights Caesar's interest in the order and importance of the Druids in Gaul.

Caesar spent a great amount of time in Gaul and his book is one of the best preserved accounts of the Druids from an author who was in Gaul. However, although Caesar provides what is seemingly a first-hand account, much of his knowledge of the Druids comes not from personal experience, but rather from the hearsay of others, and is regarded as anachronistic. Caesar based some of his account on that of Posidonius, who wrote a clear and well-known account of the Druids in Gaul. Caesar provides his account of the Druids as a means of sharing his knowledge and educating the Roman people on the foreign conquests.

There is no doubt that the Druids offered sacrifices to their god. However, scholars are still uncertain about what kind of offerings they made. Caesar and other Roman authors assert that the Druids would offer human sacrifices on numerous occasions for relief from disease and famine or for a successful war campaign. Caesar provides a detailed account of the manner in which the supposed human sacrifices occurred in chapter 16, claiming that "they have images of immense size, the limbs of which are framed with twisted twigs and filled with living persons. These being set on fire, those within are encompassed by the flames" (6.16).

Caesar, however, also observes and mentions a civil Druid culture. In chapter 13, he claims that they selected a single leader who ruled until his death, and a successor would be chosen by a vote or through violence. Also in chapter 13, he mentions that the Druids studied "the stars and their movements, the size of the cosmos and the earth, the nature of the world, and the powers of immortal deities," signifying to the Roman people that the Druids were also versed in astrology, cosmology, and theology. Although Caesar is one of the few primary sources on the Druids, many believe that he had used his influence to portray the Druids to the Roman people as both barbaric, as they performed human sacrifices, and civilized in order to depict the Druids as a society worth assimilating to Rome (6.16).

=== Vorenus and Pullo ===
Lucius Vorenus and Titus Pullo were two centurions in the garrison of Quintus Tullius Cicero, brother of Marcus Tullius Cicero, and are mentioned in Book 5.44 of De Bello Gallico. They were bitter rivals who both sought to achieve the greatest honors "and every year used to contend for promotion with the utmost animosity" (5.44). Their garrison had come under siege during a rebellion by the tribes of the Belgae led by Ambiorix. They showed their prowess during this siege by jumping from the wall and directly into the enemy despite being completely outnumbered. During the fighting, they both find themselves in difficult positions and are forced to save each other, first Vorenus saving Pullo and then Pullo saving Vorenus. Through great bravery they are both able to make it back alive slaying many enemies in the process. They return to the camp showered in praise and honors by their fellow soldiers. Though they started out in competition, they both showed themselves to be worthy of the highest praise and equal to each other in bravery (5.44).

Caesar uses this anecdote to illustrate the courage and bravery of his soldiers. Since his forces had already been humiliated and defeated in previous engagements, he needed to report a success story to Rome that would lift the spirits of the people. Furthermore, the tale of unity on the battlefield between two personal rivals is in direct opposition to the disunity of Sabinus and Cotta, which resulted in the destruction of an entire legion. He relates this particular account to illustrate that, despite the losses against Ambiorix and his army, Rome is still able to trust in the valor of its soldiers. Thus, Caesar turns a military blunder into a positive propaganda story.

=== Hostage exchanges ===
In the first two books of De Bello Gallico, there are seven examples of hostage exchanges. First, the Helveti exchange hostages with the Sequani as a promise that the Sequani will let the Helveti pass and that the Helveti will not cause mischief (1.9 and 1.19). The Helveti also give Caesar hostages to ensure that the Helveti keep their promises (1.14). Then the Aedui gave hostages to the Sequani, during the Sequani's rise to power (1.31). In Book 2, the Belgae were exchanging hostages to create an alliance against Rome (2.1) and the Remi offered Caesar hostages in their surrender (2.3, 2.5). Later in the book Caesar receives 600 hostages from the Aedui (2.15) and other hostages from most of Gaul (2.35). This practice of exchanging hostages continues to be used throughout Caesar's campaigns in diplomacy and foreign policy.

Today the term hostage has a different connotation than it did for the Ancient Romans, which is shown in the examples above. Where the Romans did take prisoners of war, hostages could also be given or exchanged in times of peace. The taking of hostages as collateral during political arrangements was a common practice in ancient Rome. The idea of the practice was that important people from each side were given to ensure that both sides kept their word; a type of contract. Two examples of this: Caesar demanding the children of chieftains (2.5) and accepting the two sons of King Galba (2.13). However, as seen by Caesar, sometimes it was only a one-way exchange, with Caesar taking hostages but not giving any.

There is evidence though, particularly in Caesar's De Bello Gallico, indicating that the practice was not always effective. Cities often moved to rebel against Rome, even though hostages were in Roman custody. Occasionally, hostages would be entrusted to a neutral or mediating party during a rebellion, such as the time one hundred hostages surrendered by the Senones were placed in the custody of the Aedui who helped negotiate between the dissidents and Caesar. Some sources say there is not much evidence that hostages were even harmed, let alone severely, in retribution of the broken agreements. It is commonly noted that Caesar never mentions penalties being dealt to hostages. Taking hostages did benefit Rome in one particular way: since hostages were commonly the sons of political figures and would typically be under Roman watch for a year or more, Romans had ample time to introduce those hostages to the Roman customs in hopes that when they were freed, they would go on to become influential political leaders themselves and favor Rome in subsequent foreign relations.

== Modern influence ==
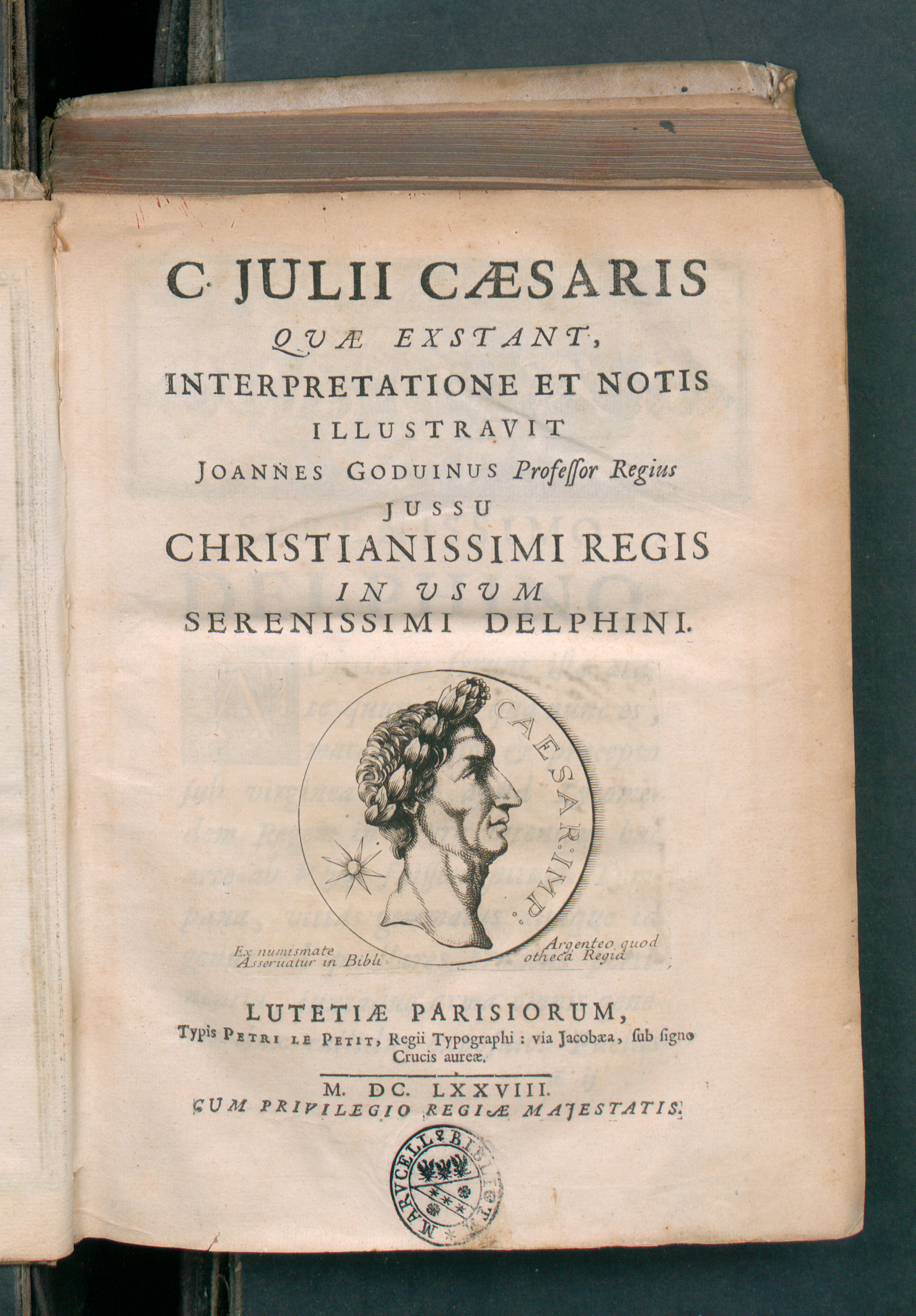
C. Julii Caesaris quae extant, 1678

=== Educational use ===
This book is often lauded for its polished, clear Latin; in particular, German historian Hans Herzfeld describes the work as "a paradigm of proper reporting and stylistic clarity". It is traditionally the first authentic text assigned to students of Latin, as Xenophon's Anabasis is for students of Ancient Greek; they are both autobiographical tales of military adventure told in the third person. It contains many details and employs many stylistic devices to promote Caesar's political interests.

The books are valuable for the many geographical and historical claims that can be retrieved from the work. Notable chapters describe Gaulish custom (6.13), their religion (6.17), and a comparison between Gauls and Germanic peoples (6.24).

=== In modern media ===
- Since Caesar is one of the characters in the Astérix and Obélix albums, René Goscinny included gags for French schoolchildren who had the Commentarii as a textbook, even though Latin was then disappearing from French schools. One example is having Caesar talk about himself in the third person as in the book. Most English editions of Asterix begin with the prelude: "The year is 50 BC. Gaul is entirely occupied by the Romans. Well not entirely! One small village of indomitable Gauls still holds out against the invaders." In the 36th book of the Asterix series, Asterix and the Missing Scroll, a fictitious and supposedly censored chapter from Caesar's Commentaries on the Gallic War forms the basis for the story.
- In Book 5, Chapter 44 the Commentarii de Bello Gallico notably mentions Lucius Vorenus and Titus Pullo, two Roman centurions of the 11th Legion. The 2005 television series Rome gives a fictionalized account of Caesar's rise and fall, featuring Kevin McKidd as the character of Lucius Vorenus and Ray Stevenson as the character of Titus Pullo of the 13th Legion.
- During World War I the French composer Vincent d'Indy wrote his Third Symphony, which bears the title De Bello Gallico. D'Indy was adapting Caesar's title to the situation of the current struggle in France against the German army, in which he had a son and nephew fighting, and which the music illustrates to some extent.

== Manuscripts and publication history ==
Since the work of Karl Nipperdey in 1847, the existing manuscripts have been divided into two classes. The first (α) encompasses manuscripts containing only De Bello Gallico and characterized by colophons with allusions to late antique correctores. The oldest manuscript in this class is MS. Amsterdam 73, written at Fleury Abbey in the later ninth century. The second (β) encompasses manuscripts containing all of the related works—not only De Bello Gallico, but De Bello Civili, De Bello Alexandrino, De Bello Africo, and De Bello Hispaniensi, always in that order. The oldest manuscript in this class is MS Paris lat. 3864, written at Corbie in the last quarter of the ninth century. For De Bello Gallico, the readings of α are considered better than β. In total, there are some 240 medieval manuscripts preserving the text and besides the aforementioned groupings, the stemma codicum is not fully understood.

The editio princeps was published by Giovanni Andrea Bussi at Rome in 1469.

The original publication time of the Bello Gallico is uncertain. It had been definitely published by 46 BC, when Cicero reviewed it and gave it great praise. It is unclear whether the books were released individually, or all at once. Nipperdey's 1847 account believed that they had been mostly all composed at once in 50 BC. Frank Adcock suggested in 1956 that they had been written in stages, but then published simultaneously. T. P. Wiseman believed they were written and published yearly, as Caesar would have gained enormous utility from keeping the public informed about his exploits. The debate as to the time and nature of publication continues, with critical examination of the evolution of the writing style the chief tool for dating the work. Even if the works were published after the wars, it was clear that Caesar was waging a propaganda campaign during the war, including writing copious letters to his political allies back in Rome. Because of the questionable nature of the war, and threats by his enemies to have him essentially tried for war crimes, winning the public relations battle was critical for Caesar.

== Historiography ==
=== Accuracy ===
Caesar's account was largely taken as truthful and accurate until the 20th century. Nipperdey's manuscript in 1847 was considered "monumental", and was the first critical examination of the text, which considered Caesar to be infallible. Nipperdey even chose to modify his translation of the text where it contradicted itself, giving Caesar the benefit of any doubts. Even in 1908, Camille Jullian wrote a comprehensive history of Gaul and took Caesar's account as unerring. But after World War II historians began to question if Caesar's claims stood up.

Historian David Henige takes particular issue with the supposed population and warrior counts. Caesar claims that he was able to estimate the population of the Helvetii because in their camp there was a census, written in Greek on tablets, which would have indicated 263,000 Helvetii and 105,000 allies, of whom exactly one quarter (92,000) were combatants. But Henige points out that such a census would have been difficult to achieve by the Gauls, that it would make no sense to be written in Greek by non-Greek tribes, and that carrying such a large quantity of stone or wood tablets on their migration would have been a monumental feat. Henige finds it oddly convenient that exactly one quarter were combatants, suggesting that the numbers were more likely ginned up by Caesar than outright counted by census. Contemporary authors estimated that the population of the Helvetii and their allies were lower. Livy, for example, surmised that there were 157,000 overall — a number Henige argues is also inaccurate.

During the campaign against the Usipetes and the Tenceri, Caesar makes the incredible claim that the Romans faced an army of 430,000 Gauls, that the Roman victory was overwhelming, that the Romans lost not a single soldier, and that upon their loss the Gauls committed mass suicide. Henige finds this entire story impossible, as did Ferdinand Lot, writing in 1947. Lot was one of the first modern authors who directly questioned the validity of Caesar's numbers, finding a fighting force of 430,000 to have been unbelievable for the time.

Not all contemporaries of Caesar believed the account to have been accurate. Gaius Asinius Pollio, who served under Caesar, noted that the account had been put together without much care or regard for the truth. Still, Pollio attributed this to mistakes by Caesar's lieutenants, or even that Caesar intended to rewrite the text more accurately. Up until the 20th century authors tended to follow Pollio's thinking, attributing mistakes not to Caesar but to the process, such as errors in translation and transcription throughout time. Ernest Desjardins, writing in 1876, suggested (in what Henige considers to be very charitable on Desjardins part) that the error in numbers in the Usipetes campaign was the result of a mis-transcription of "CCCCXXX" instead of "XXXXIII", which would mean that the real size of the Gaulic force was actually just 43,000. But even Henige suggests that it is possible the numbers have not always been accurately written down, and that the earliest surviving manuscripts are only from the ninth to twelfth centuries.

Part of the dispute over the historiography of the Commentarii revolves around modern authors trying to use it to estimate the pre-Roman population of Gaul. In the 18th century, authors extrapolated from the text populations of 40–200 million. Authors in the 19th century guessed in the 15–20 million range based on the text. 20th century authors guessed as low as 4 million, with Henige giving a modern range of 4–48 million between authors.

Ultimately, Henige sees the Commentarii as a very clever piece of propaganda written by Caesar, built to make Caesar appear far grander than he was. Henige notes that Caesar's matter of fact tone and easy to read writing made it all the easier to accept his outlandish claims. Caesar sought to portray his fight as a justified defense against the barbarity of the Gauls (which was important, as Caesar had actually been the aggressor contrary to his claims). By making it appear that he had won against overwhelming odds and suffered minimal casualties, he further increased the belief that he and the Romans were godly and destined to win against the godless barbarians of Gaul. Overall, Henige concludes that "Julius Caesar must be considered one of history's earliest – and most durably successful – 'spin doctors'".

Although Caesar used this account for his own gain, it is not to say that the De Bello Gallico is at all unreliable. The victories that Caesar has written about did, in fact, occur. Smaller details, however, may have been altered, and the word choice makes the reader more sympathetic to Caesar's cause. De Bello Gallico is an excellent example of the ways in which retellings of actual events can be spun to a person's advantage. For this reason, De Bello Gallico is often looked at as a commentary, rather than a piece of actual historiography.

=== Authorship ===
Classicist Ruth Breindal believes it likely that Caesar did not directly write the work, but instead dictated most of it to a scribe at one time and the scribe wrote as Caesar spoke, or that the scribe took notes and wrote the account afterwards. Still, she does believe that Caesar had an overwhelming hand in creating the work, but believes much of the grammar and clarity of the work to be the result of the scribe or scribes involved. Breindal also considers the main point of the work to be as a propaganda piece to protect Caesar's reputation in the vicious politics of Rome. The final chapters of book eight were written after Caesar's death in 44 BC by consul Aulus Hirtius; Hirtius must have written the book before his own death in the civil war in 43 BC.

The author portrays Caesar's thoughts frequently, with an emphasis on making Caesar seem efficient, decisive, and straightforward, and that his view on how war should be waged is the same. The work paints the conflict as inevitable and necessary.

The tradition which attributes the entire eighth commentary to Aulus Hirtius has been criticised by the classical philologist Luciano Canfora as it is based on an incorrect interpretation of the words of Suetonius, who defines Caesar's commentary as "last and incomplete" (novissimum imperfectumque), adding that the final chapters "could have been added" (suppleverit) by Hirtius, with the same terms used with respect to Sulla's final commentary, which was also "completed" (supplevit) by the freedman Epicadus. The letter to Balbus, bearing the unlikely epigraph «Hircius Pansa» and handed down as a preface to the eighth commentary, would also be a fabrication from the late antique period, as it is based on the already explained incorrect interpretation of Suetonius and refers to contents absent within the commentary.

=== As literature ===
From the 1970s, some critics began to regard the work less as history than literature, in the tradition of poets following the model of Homer.

== See also ==
- Ancient France
- Roman army
  - Campaign history of the Roman military
  - Military history of ancient Rome
- Ancient Roman treatises on war:
  - Commentarii de Bello Civili
  - De Bello Alexandrino
  - De Bello Africo
  - De Bello Hispaniensi

== Editions ==
- Krebs, Christopher B. (2023). Caesar: Bellum Gallicum book VII. Cambridge; New York: Cambridge University Press. ISBN 9781009177122.
