= Latin indirect speech =

Latin Speech

Indirect speech, also known as reported speech, indirect discourse (US), or ōrātiō oblīqua (/əˈreɪʃɪoʊ əˈblaɪkwə/ or /oʊˈrɑːtɪoʊ ɒˈbliːkwə/), is the practice, common in all Latin historical writers, of reporting spoken or written words indirectly, using different grammatical forms. Passages of indirect speech can extend from a single phrase to an entire paragraph, and this style was generally preferred by Roman historians to the direct speech commonly found in Greek authors.

The main types of indirect speech in Latin are indirect statements, indirect commands, and indirect questions. Indirect statements in classical Latin usually use the accusative and infinitive construction. In this the main verb of the quoted sentence is changed to an infinitive, and its subject to the accusative case; this construction is also sometimes used for commands and rhetorical questions.

Indirect questions, most indirect commands, and most subordinate verbs in indirect statements use the subjunctive mood. Subjunctive mood tenses are divided into two groups, primary (present and perfect) and historic (imperfect and pluperfect). The historic tenses are used when the context is past time, although it is also possible sometimes to use a primary tense in a past context, a practice referred to as repraesentātiō tempōrum.

Although the term ōrātiō oblīqua strictly speaking refers to the reporting of spoken or written words, the same grammatical constructions are also used in sentences introduced by other verbs such as those of perceiving, showing, remembering, and thinking. These are also included in this article. In some cases, especially in longer passages of ōrātiō oblīqua, the verb of speaking is omitted, and the grammatical form alone shows that the words are indirect.

== Main types of indirect speech ==
=== Indirect statement ===
The most common type of indirect speech is indirect statement, for which in classical Latin (although not in medieval Latin) the usual grammatical form is the accusative and infinitive construction. In this the subject of the quoted sentence is put into the accusative case, and the verb is changed to an infinitive.

Four main tenses of the infinitive are used: the present, the perfect, the future participle with esse (which is often omitted), and the future participle with fuisse. The present infinitive is used when the actions expressed by the subordinate sentence are contemporary to the actions expressed by the main sentence – the latter can have a past, a present or a future tense:

nūntiātum est adesse Scīpiōnem (Caesar)
'it was reported that Scipio was nearby'

The perfect infinitive is used when the actions expressed by the subordinate sentence precede the actions expressed by the main sentence – the latter can have a past, a present or a future tense:

mihī nūntiāvit M. Mārcellum ... duo vulnera accēpisse (Servius Sulpicius Rufus)
'he reported to me that Marcus Marcellus had received two wounds'

The future infinitive (with esse often omitted) is used when the actions expressed by the subordinate sentence follow the actions expressed by the main sentence – the latter can have a past, a present or a future tense:

Valerium hodiē audiēbam esse ventūrum (Cicero)
'I heard that Valerius was due to arrive today'

One verb, sum 'I am' has its own future infinitive fore, which may be used instead of futūrum esse. The verb possum 'I am able' on the other hand has no future infinitive or future participle.

The future participle combined with fuisse, which expresses a past or present potential ('would be doing' or 'would have done'):

nisī dē viā fessus esset, continuō ad nōs ventūrum fuisse (Cicero)
'(he said that) if he had not been tired from the journey, he would have come to us straightaway'

Three other tenses are found in indirect statements: the supine with īrī, the perfect participle with fore, and the perfect participle with fuisse. However, these are rare.

The main verb introducing indirect statements does not have to be a verb of speaking; it can also be any of a range of other verbs, such as sēnsit 'he realised', simulāvit 'he pretended', cōnstat 'it is well known', spērō 'I hope', scrīpsit 'he wrote' and so on, which use the same construction.

The infinitive is used only for the main verb in an indirect statement; any other verbs are changed into the subjunctive mood, using one of the past tenses if the context is past:

locum ubi esset facile inventūrōs (Nepos)
'(he told them that) they would easily find the place where he was'

=== Indirect question ===
Another kind of indirect speech is the indirect question, in which the verb is usually changed into the subjunctive mood:

quārē id faciam fortasse requīris? (Catullus)
'do you ask why I do this, perhaps?'

When the context is past, one of the past tenses of the subjunctive is used (imperfect or pluperfect). (There are some exceptions to this rule, however.)

quid eā nocte ēgisset ... ēdocuī (Cicero)
'I told them what he had done that night'

=== Indirect command ===
The third main type of indirect speech is the indirect command, for which two constructions are possible. Some verbs, principally the verb iubeō 'I order' and its opposite vetō 'I forbid', use the accusative and infinitive construction, often with a passive infinitive:

signum darī iubet (Caesar)
'he ordered the signal to be given'

Most other verbs use a clause introduced by the conjunction ut/utī or (if negative) nē followed by a subjunctive verb. As with indirect questions, the tense of the subjunctive depends on whether the context is present or past. A present context requires the present subjunctive:

hortātur mē ut senātū scrībam (Cicero)
'he is encouraging me to write to the Senate'

A past context usually (but not always) has the imperfect subjunctive:

exercituī imperāvit nē iniussū suō concurrerent (Caesar)
'he ordered the army not to start fighting without his permission'

== Change of person ==
Another of the characteristics of indirect speech is that the pronouns and persons of the verb change in accordance to the viewpoint of the new speaker. Thus in the following example, the original thought was 'he is very grateful to you'. In indirect speech this becomes:

ad mē scrīpsit tē mihī maximās grātiās agere (Cicero)
'he wrote to me that you were very grateful to me'

Very often the viewpoint changes to the 3rd person, in which case the reflexive pronoun sē (or sēsē) 'himself, herself, themselves' and its various derivatives suī, sibī, sēcum, suus etc. are used in order to refer to the speaker of the reported words:

hunc sequī sē iubet (Nepos)
'he ordered this man to follow him'

ille respondit sē ignōrāre Aristīdēn (Nepos)
'he replied that he did not know Aristides personally'

When the subject of the verb of speaking is feminine or plural, sē will be translated as 'she' or 'they':

uxor eius dīxit sē in balneīs virīlibus lavārī velle (Gellius)
'his wife said that she wished to bathe in the men's baths'

dīxērunt sē dēceptōs (Pliny the Younger)
'they said they had been cheated'

The reflexive pronoun sē can sometimes be used to refer to the speaker even when the speaker is not strictly the grammatical subject of the sentence, as in this example:

ā Caesare invītor sibī ut sim lēgātus (Cicero)
'I am being invited by Caesar to be one of his deputy commanders'

A third person which is not the subject is referred to by illum or eum 'him, that person'. To avoid ambiguity in English, it is often necessary to insert a name:

dīxit sē scīre illum verbīs conceptīs pēierāsse (Cicero)
'he (Africanus) said that he knew that Licinius had been lying when he took the oath'

However, sē and suus can be ambiguous, since in addition to referring to the speaker, they can also refer reflexively to the subject of the nearest verb. Thus in these two indirect questions, the word sibī refers to Caesar (the subject of vellet) but suās 'his' refers to the speaker, Ariovistus:

quid sibī vellet? cūr in suās possessiōnēs venīret? (Caesar)
'what did Caesar want for himself? why was he entering Ariovistus's territory?'

Similarly, in the following example, suum and sibī refer to the Roman ambassadors (the subject of peterent), while sēcum refers to the king (the subject of habēret):

lēgātōs in Bīthȳniam mīsērunt, quī ab rēge peterent, nē inimīcissimum suum sēcum habēret sibīque dēderet (Nepos)
'they sent ambassadors to Bithynia, who were to request the king that he should not keep their greatest enemy with him, but hand him over to them'

== Indirect statements ==
=== Constructions with the infinitive ===
==== Verbs of speaking ====
Often in historical writing there is no verb of speaking but it is implied by the context and by the use of the accusative and infinitive construction:

nūntium mittit ut veniant: rem atrōcem incidisse (Livy)
'she sent a messenger to say that they should come: a terrible thing had happened'

lēgātōs ad Caesarem mittunt: sēsē parātōs esse portās aperīre... (Caesar)
'they sent ambassadors to Caesar: (they declared that) they were prepared to open the gates...'

A future tense in indirect speech is turned into a future participle + esse. The infinitive esse is very often omitted:

secūtūrōs sē dictātōrem respondērunt (Livy)
'they replied that they would follow the dictator'

A pronoun is usually used for the subject of an infinitive, even if it is omitted in direct speech. However, in some cases, when the pronoun is easily understood from the context, it can be dropped:

reperit esse vēra (Caesar)
'he found out that (those things) were true'

When the verb is impersonal, such as vidērī 'it seems' or oportēre 'it is fitting', there is no subject:

spērarī tamen eum vīvere posse (Servius)
'(he told me that) it was hoped, however, that he would be able to live'

When the infinitive esse is combined with a future or perfect participle, a gerundive, or an adjective, esse is sometimes omitted:

pollicētur L. Pīsō cēnsor sēsē itūrum ad Caesarem (Caesar)
'Lucius Piso, the Censor, promised that he would go to Caesar'

The accusative and infinitive is also used for expressing what someone shows or pretends to be the case:

sē proficīscī ad Caesarem simulāvit (Caesar)
'he pretended that he was setting off to see Caesar'

==== Verbs of perception ====
An accusative and infinitive can also be used to express a piece of information which someone has been told, or by extension which someone has learnt about, noticed, realised, seen, dreamed of, perceived or simply knows:

cognovērunt Caesarem ipsum in classe vēnisse ([Caesar])
'they learnt that Caesar himself had come in the fleet'

sēnsit prōditum cōnsilium esse. (Livy)
'he realised that the plot had been betrayed.'

vīdit in magnō sē fore perīculō, nisi quid prōvīdisset (Nepos)
'he foresaw that he was going to be in great danger, unless he took some precautions'

Verbs of perception such as videō 'I see' and inveniō 'I find' can also be followed by a present participle (without esse). In the following example, the two constructions are shown side by side:

respiciēns videt magnīs intervallīs sequentēs, ūnum haud procul ab sēsē abesse (Livy)
'looking back, he saw them following at wide intervals, and that one of them was not far away from him'

Introductory verbs of speaking, thinking, realising, pretending etc. are known as verba dēclārandī, while those of learning, seeing, hearing, noticing, and knowing are known as verba sentiendī.

The accusative and present participle construction can also sometimes be found after verbs such as cognōscō 'I learn':

at ille ut Carthāginem vēnit multō aliter ac spērārat rem pūblicam sē habentem cognōvit (Nepos)
'but when he arrived in Carthage, he found out that the republic was in a very different state than he had hoped'

==== Verbs of thinking and feeling ====
Another reason to use the accusative and infinitive is to express someone's thoughts, such as the reasons for undertaking a certain course of action:

magnō sibī ūsuī fore arbitrābātur, sī modo īnsulam adiisset (Caesar)
'he thought it would be very useful for him, if he could just go to the island'

It can similarly be used with verbs such as cōnfīdō 'I am sure', meminī 'I remember', and oblīvīscor 'I forget':

cōnfīdō tē esse factūrum (Cicero)
'I am sure that you are going to do it'

nōn possum oblīvīscī meam hanc esse patriam (Cicero)
'I cannot forget that this country is mine'

Occasionally verbs of emotion such as 'I am glad' or 'I am sorry' can take an accusative and infinitive; although the more usual construction is a quod-clause:

salvum tē advēnisse gaudeō (Terence)
'I'm glad you've arrived safely'

==== Negative statements ====
When the reported sentence is negative, it is common to use the verb negō rather than dīcō ... nōn:

Phōciōn negāvit esse perīculum (Nepos)
'Phocion denied that there was any danger / said there was no danger'

Similarly nōn putō is used in preference to putō ... nōn:

hospitem violāre fās nōn putant (Caesar)
'they do not think it is right to do violence to a guest'

In the same way vetō 'I forbid' is used in place of iubeō ... nōn.

==== Passive main verb ====
When the verb of speaking is passive, it can be used either personally ('he is said to have done it') or impersonally ('it is said that he did it'). A present tense such as dīcitur 'he is said' or vidētur 'he seems' is usually used personally:

Corinthī dīcitur lūdum aperuisse (Cicero)
'he is said to have opened a school at Corinth'

When the verb of speaking is used personally, the subject of the reported statement, and hence any participles or nouns agreeing with it, are nominative:

ventūrus esse dīcitur. (Cicero)
'he is said to be planning to come'

nāvigātūrus vidētur. (Cicero)
'it seems that he's about to sail'

magnus mathēmaticus fuisse dīcitur (Cicero)
'he is said to have been a great mathematician'

However, when the verb uses a compound tense such as the perfect passive nūntiātum est, it is usually used impersonally, hence with an accusative and infinitive:

nūntiātum est nōbīs Caesarem Beneventī mānsūrum (Cicero)
'it has been reported to us that Caesar is going to stay at Beneventum'

==== Nominative and infinitive ====
Sometimes an active verb of speaking can be used with a nominative and infinitive construction, but only in poetry. The word 'claim' is used in the same way in English:

ait fuisse nāvium celerrimus (Catullus)
'he claims to have been the fastest of boats'

=== Other indirect statement constructions ===
==== Nōn dubitō ====
Although cōnfīdō 'I am sure that' takes the accusative and infinitive, the phrase nōn dubitō 'I do not doubt' is usually followed by quīn and a subjunctive verb, in the same way as an indirect question:

nec dubitāvēre quīn ipse rēx esset occīsus (Curtius)
'nor did they doubt that the king himself had been killed'

The construction with quīn can also be used after other negative phrases:

neque abest suspīciō quīn ipse sibī mortem conscīverit (Caesar)
'nor is the suspicion absent that he planned his own death'

contrōversia nōn erat quīn vērum dīcerent (Cicero)
'there was no doubt that they were telling the truth'

In the following example, however, nōn dubitō is followed by futūrum (esse):

neque enim dubitō futūrum ut nōn dēpōnās sī semel sūmpserīs (Pliny the Younger)
'for I am sure that you won't be able to put (the book) down once you have picked it up'

==== Quod with the indicative ====
Another way of expressing the English conjunction 'that...' is to use a quod-clause, with the indicative. This is found whenever the meaning is 'the fact that...'; for example:

quod rediit nōbīs mīrābile vidētur (Cicero)
'that he (Regulus) returned seems marvellous to us'

Quod is also used after verbs of adding or omitting:

praetereō quod eam sibī domum dēlēgit (Cicero)
'I pass over the fact that he chose that house for himself'

It is also found after verbs of emotion such as 'I am glad that', 'I am sorry that', 'it turned out well that' and so on:

dolet mihi quod tū nunc stomachāris (Cicero)
'I'm sorry that you're angry now'

==== Quod with the subjunctive ====
In later Latin, quod with the subjunctive could substitute for the accusative and infinitive in indirect statement, though this did not become common until the second century AD:

lēgātī renūntiāvērunt quod Pompeium in potestāte habērent (De Bello Hispaniensi)
'the ambassadors reported that they had Pompey in their power'

et vīdit Deus quod esset bonum (Vulgate Bible)
'and God saw that it was good'

This type of clause with quod (which became que in modern French, Portuguese, and Spanish and che in Italian, and că in Romanian) gradually took over from the accusative and infinitive construction and became the usual way of expressing indirect speech in modern Romance languages which are descended from Latin.

==== Quia and quoniam ====
In vulgar and post-classical Latin, the conjunction quia, which means 'because' in classical Latin, could also be used to introduce an indirect statement. They are usually used with the indicative mood:

ego illī iam trēs cardēlēs occīdī, et dīxī quia mustella comēdit (Petronius)
'I killed his three goldfinches, and told him that a weasel had eaten them'

audīstis quia dictum est antīquīs nōn occīdēs (Vulgate Bible)
'you have heard that it was said to the ancients "thou shalt not kill".'

scimus quia verum est testimonium eius (Vulgate Bible)
'we know that his testimony is true'

The conjunction quoniam 'since', can also introduce an indirect statement:

scrīptum est enim quoniam Abraham duōs fīliōs habuit (Vulgate Bible)
'for it is written that Abraham had two sons'

negat quoniam Jēsus nōn est Christus (Vulgate Bible)
'he denies, (saying) that Jesus is not Christ'

The Greek word ὅτι (hóti) which quia and quoniam translate also means 'because' or 'that'.

==== Expressions with ut ====
In addition, various expressions such as accidit ut 'it happened that', effēcit ut 'he brought it about that', etc. are followed by an ut-clause with the subjunctive. However, these are generally classified in grammar books as a type of consecutive clause, rather than ōrātiō oblīqua. The negative is ut ... nōn.

accidit cāsū ut lēgātī Prūsiae Rōmae cēnārent (Nepos)
'it happened by chance that some ambassadors of King Prusias were dining in Rome'

effēcit ut imperātor cum exercitū in Hispāniam mitterētur (Nepos)
'he arranged that he should be sent to Spain as commander with an army'

utinam quidem dī immortālēs fēcissent ut tuus potius mīles quam Cn. Pompēī factus essem! (De Bello Hispaniensi)
'if only the immortal gods had brought it about that I had become your soldier rather than Gnaeus Pompeius's!'

datur haec venia antīquitātī ut miscendō hūmāna dīvīnīs prīmōrdia urbium augustiōra faciat (Livy)
'this pardon is given to antiquity that by mixing human and divine it makes the beginnings of cities more grand'

== Indirect questions ==
In the second type of indirect speech, indirect question, the verb is usually changed to the subjunctive mood, although occasionally, in rhetorical questions, the infinitive may be used (see below). When the context is primary, the present or perfect subjunctive is usual:

nesciō cūr nōn possint (Cicero)
'I don't know why they can't'

quid ēgerīs, ubī fuerīs, quōs convocāverīs, quid cōnsiliī cēperīs, quem nostrum ignorāre arbitrāris? (Cicero)
'What you were doing, where you were, who you (had) called together, what plans you made, which of us do you think does not know these things?'

The first four the verbs in the last example above are perfect subjunctive, which in an indirect question may represent an imperfect, perfect, or pluperfect tense in the original speech. These four verbs are dependent on the infinitive ignōrāre. The last part of the sentence is an accusative and infinitive, since it is a rhetorical question resembling a statement ('there is none of us who doesn't know') more than a question.

When the context is historic, the imperfect and pluperfect subjunctives are usual:

tum ostendī tabellās Lentulō et quaesīvī, cognōsceretne signum; adnuit. (Cicero)
'then I showed the tablets to Lentulus and asked if he recognised the seal; he nodded.'

quaesīvī ā Catilīnā in nocturnō conventū apud M. Laecam fuisset necne. (Cicero)
'I asked Catiline whether he had been at the nighttime meeting at Marcus Laeca's house or not.'

When the main verb in a direct question is a simple future tense, it becomes a future participle with the subjunctive of sum in an indirect question:

plānē quid futūrum sit nesciō. (Cicero)
'I have absolutely no idea what is going to happen'

quid sit futūrum crās fuge quaerere (Horace)
'avoid asking what will be tomorrow'

Similarly, a passive periphrastic construction (in which the sense of obligation becomes absent or very weak) can be used to form the passive simple future of the subjunctive mood:

egō nōn quaeram … semel haec mihī videnda sint, an saepe [mihī] nāscendum [sit]?. (Seneca)
'should I not wonder … whether I will see this world only once or I will be born many times?'

scīmus quidem nihil umquam novandum [sit], quum Rōmānum semper imperium aut tuum futūrum sit, aut tuōrum. (Pacatus)
'we know indeed that nothing will ever be changed, since the Roman empire will always be either yours or of yours heirs.'

At least one example exists for the passive past future of the subjunctive mood (formed by futurus sim + past participle):

nec dubitō quīn, legente tē hās litterās, cōnfecta jam rēs futūra sit (Cicero)
'nor do I doubt that by the time you read this letter, the matter will already have been settled'

A past potential subjunctive in a conditional clause becomes a future participle with the perfect subjunctive of sum:

dīc quidnam factūrus fuerīs, sī eō tempore cēnsor fuissēs (Livy)
'tell us what you would have done, if you had been censor at that time'

An indirect question in Latin is usually the object or the subject of the main sentence:

mīror cūr mē accūsēs (Cicero)
'I wonder why you accuse me [obj.]'

videndum est ut honestē vōs esse possītis (Cicero)
'how you can stay without discredit [subj.] must be assessed'

quaerere solēbat cui bonō fuisset (Cicero)
'he used to ask who had benefitted (from the crime)' (lit. 'to whom it had been for good')

When the indirect question is expected to be an oblique or adpositional case, it is treated like an object case (and the preposition dropped):

duae causae sunt cūr tū frequentior in istō officiō esse dēbeās quam nōs (Cicero)
'there are two reasons (of) why [gen.] you must be more assiduous in this office than I am'

nē omnēs ā physicīs irrīdeāmur sī dīcāmus quidquam fierī sine causā, distinguendum est et ita dīcendum: ipsīus indīviduī hanc esse nātūram ut pondere et gravitāte moveātur, eamque ipsam esse causam cūr ita ferātur. (Cicero)
'in order for us all not to be laughed at by physicists if we say that something happens without cause, a distinction must be made and the thing must be put in this way: the very nature of the atom is such that it is carried by gravity and weight, and that is the cause (of) why [gen.] it moves the way it moves.'

diū magnum inter mortālīs certāmen fuit vīne corporis an virtūte animī rēs mīlitāris magis prōcēderet. (Sallust)
'for a long time among mortals there was a big dispute on whether [prep. + adp.] success in war depends more on bodily strength or mental excellence'

Sometimes, when it was felt necessary to preserve the oblique or adpositional nature of the sentence, the latter was converted from an indirect question to the genitive of a gerund or gerundive governed by modus, ratio, causa, or a similar word:

Quaesītum tractātumque: Quid sint “manubiae”, atque inibi dicta quaedam dē ratiōne ūtendī verbīs plūribus idem significantibus. (Gellius)
'Asked and discussed: What “manubiae” are, and some observations therein on how [prep. + adp.] several words of the same meaning can be used.'

=== Wh-questions ===
Indirect questions which are dependent on a verb of asking in the classical period usually use a subjunctive verb. (The indicative is found in early Latin and sometimes in poetry.) When the context is past, as in the second example below, the tense of the quoted verb is usually changed to past in according with the sequence of tenses rule:

quaerunt ā mē ubī sit pecūnia (Cicero)
'they are asking me where the money is'

quaesīvit unde esset epistula (Cicero)
'he asked where the letter was from'

A question in ōrātiō oblīqua does not always have an introductory verb, but can be indicated as being indirect by the use of the subjunctive mood. The following questions come in the middle of a long speech by the Germanic chieftain Ariovistus:

quid sibī vellet? cūr in suās possessiōnēs venīret? (Caesar)
'what did Caesar want for himself? why was he entering Ariovistus's territory?'

=== Yes–no questions ===
Indirect questions expecting an answer yes or no can be introduced by -ne or num ('whether', 'if'):

quaesīvit ā mē vellemne sēcum in castra proficīscī (Nepos)
'he asked me whether I wanted to go with him to the camp'

pecūniam admōvit ad nārēs, scīscitāns num odōre offenderētur (Suetonius)
'he held the money under Titus's nose, asking if he was offended by the smell'

After nesciō, the particle an is used, and it is also sometimes used after other verbs (but not in Caesar or Cicero). The phrase nesciō an 'I don't know whether' means simply 'perhaps':

veniō nunc ad id quod nesciō an prīmum esse dēbuerit (Cicero)
'I now come to what perhaps ought to have been first'

Sometimes an indirect question can begin with sī 'if'. The usual meaning is 'in order to see if':

circumfunduntur hostēs sī quem aditum reperīre possent (Caesar)
'the enemy poured round (to see) if they could find any way of getting near'

In Livy sī 'if' can also mean simply 'whether':

quaesīvit sī cum Rōmānīs mīlitāre licēret (Livy)
'he asked if it were possible to serve in the Roman army'

=== Disjunctive questions ===
Alternative (disjunctive) questions are introduced by utrum ... an, -ne ... an, or simply ... an or ... -ne. For 'or not', necne is used:

cōnsultābat utrum Rōmam proficīscerētur an Capuam tenēret (Cicero)
'he was deliberating whether he should set out to Rome or make for Capua'

albus āterne fuerit ignōrās (Cicero)
'you have no idea whether he was white or black'

cum sciēs Rōmae intercalātum sit necne, velim ad mē scrībās (Cicero)
'as soon as you know whether or not the calendar in Rome has been adjusted, please write to me'

=== Indirect questions with the infinitive ===
Not all questions in ōrātiō oblīqua use the subjunctive. A rhetorical question (provided it is not directly dependent on a verb of speaking, and provided that it is not derived from an originally 2nd person verb) is put in the accusative and infinitive construction:

quōnam haec omnia nisī ad suam perniciem pertinēre? (Caesar)
'what purpose did all these things have except for his own destruction?'

quid esse turpius quam auctōre hoste capere consilium? (Caesar)
'what was more shameful than to adopt a course of action at the enemy's behest?'

A rhetorical question can also have the accusative and infinitive if it is equivalent to a statement. In the following example, the meaning is 'there is none of us who doesn't know these things':

quem nostrum ignorāre arbitrāris? (Cicero)
'which of us do you think does not know these things?'

== Indirect commands ==
=== Using the infinitive ===
In an indirect command, there are two possible forms. If the verb of speaking is iubeō 'I order', the same construction is used as in indirect statement, that is accusative and infinitive:

Perdicca puerōs equōs iussit cōnscendere (Curtius)
'Perdiccas ordered the boys to mount their horses'

centuriōnēs sē sequī iubet (Caesar)
'he ordered the centurions to follow him'

A few other verbs, such as sinō 'I allow', vetō 'I forbid', and sometimes imperō 'I order' take the same construction:

esse trīstem mē meus vetat Paetus (Martial)
'my friend Paetus forbids me to be sad'

Verbs of will, such as vetō 'I forbid', are always used personally even in the perfect passive tense:

Nōlānī mūrōs adīre vetitī sunt (Livy)
'the people of Nola were forbidden to approach the walls'

Quite commonly these verbs are used with a passive infinitive:

Caesar pontem iubet rescindī (Caesar)
'Caesar ordered the bridge to be torn down'

signum darī atque in hostēs impetum fierī iussit (Caesar)
'He ordered the signal to be given and an attack to be made on the enemy'

vīnum importārī nōn sinunt. (Caesar)
'they do not allow wine to be imported'

hoc fierī nūlla lēx vetat (Cicero)
'no law forbids this to be done / says this may not be done'

Līviam ad sē dēdūcī imperāvit (Suetonius)
'he ordered that Livia should be brought to him'

=== Using the subjunctive ===
However, most verbs of ordering, persuading, and encouraging are followed by ut (utī) 'that' or nē 'that not' and a subjunctive mood verb. This construction is common after verbs such as imperō 'I order', rogō 'I ask', petō 'I request', moneō 'I advise', persuādeō 'I persuade', hortor 'I exhort' and others. If the context is past, the imperfect subjunctive is used, otherwise the present:

imperāvit eī ut omnēs forēs aedificiī circumīret (Nepos)
'he ordered him to go round all the doors of the building'

ille persuāsit populō ut eā pecūniā classis centum nāvium aedificārētur (Nepos)
'he persuaded the people that a fleet of a hundred ships should be built with that money'

exercituī imperāvit nē iniussū suō concurrerent (Caesar)
'he commanded the army not to join battle without his orders'

petit ut ad Caesarem mitterētur (Caesar)
'he requested to be sent to Caesar'

moneō nē faciātis (Cicero)
'I advise you not to do it'

In negative commands, it is usual to write nē umquam 'not ever' instead of numquam 'never', nē quis 'not anyone' instead of nēmō and so on.

ēdīxī nē quis iniussū meō proficīscerētur (Cicero)
'I made an edict that no one was to leave without my permission'

If there are two negative commands, the second starts with neu or nēve:

Pausaniās ōrāre coepit nē ēnūntiāret neu sē prōderet (Nepos)
'Pausanias began to beg him not to tell anyone or to betray him'

If a positive command follows a negative, it begins with et or -que or atque:

nē inimīcissimum suum sēcum habēret sibīque dēderet (Nepos)
'he should not keep their greatest enemy with him, but he should surrender him to them'

In longer passages of ōrātiō oblīqua, where there is no introductory verb, ut can be omitted:

ipsī, sī possent, comprehenderent (Nepos)
'they themselves should arrest him, if they could'

=== Verbs of will ===
The accusative and infinitive construction can be used after verbs of will, such as volō 'I want' and mālō 'I prefer', but mainly when the person has no power over the action:

vīs mē flēre (Horace)
'you want me to weep'

māluit sē dīligī quam metuī. (Nepos)
'he preferred to be loved than to be feared'

Verbs of will can also take the subjunctive in the same way as an indirect command. With the verb volō the conjunction ut can be omitted:

eās litterās volō habeās (Cicero)
'I want you to have those compositions'

== Wishes, hopes and fears ==
The sentence which is made indirect can be a wish, e.g. "may it (not) happen!" This is expressed in sentences like those below.

=== Wishes ===
The thought that is made indirect can be a wish, e.g. 'may it happen!' or 'if only it had happened!'. If the wish is for something which is impossible, the main verb becomes the imperfect subjunctive vellem, followed by the imperfect or pluperfect subjunctive:

vellem adesse posset Panaetius (Cicero)
'I wish Panaetius could be here'

vellem mē ad cēnam invītāssēs (Cicero)
'I wish you had invited me to dinner'

However, if the wish can still be true, the present subjunctive velim is used, followed by the present subjunctive:

dē Menedēmō vellem vērum fuisset, dē rēgīnā velim vērum sit. (Cicero)
'I wish it had been true about Menedemus; I hope it may be true about the queen'

=== Hopes ===
The verb spērō 'I hope' is generally followed by an accusative and infinitive construction. The following sentence has the future infinitive fore followed by ut and the subjunctive:

spērō fore ut contingat id nōbīs (Cicero).
'I hope that that will happen to us'

However, a present or perfect infinitive is also possible:

spērō tē istīc iūcundē hiemāre (Cicero)
'I hope you are passing a pleasant winter there'

spērō laetum et bene valentem celebrāsse quārtum et sexāgēsimum nātālem meum (Augustus)
'I hope you celebrated my 64th birthday in good health and spirits'

=== Fears ===
Verbs of fearing such as timeō, metuō, and vereor 'I am afraid' are generally followed by nē with the subjunctive:

timuit nē forte sacer tot ab ignibus aethēr conciperet flammās (Ovid)
'he became afraid in case by chance the sacred air might burst into flames from so many fires'

For a negative fear, nē nōn can be used:

timeō nē nōn impetrem (Cicero)
'I am afraid that I might not be granted my request'

Another possibility is to use ut; 'not' must be added in English:

ōrnāmenta quae locāvī metuō ut possim recipere (Plautus)
'as for the costume I've lent, I'm afraid I may not be able to get it back!'

Normally a verb of fearing is followed by a fear for a later time, but it can sometimes equally be a fear for something past, in which case it will be followed by a perfect or pluperfect subjunctive:

timuī nē in contubernium recēpissem Ascyltī parem (Petronius)
'I was afraid I had let Ascyltos's double into the lodgings'

== Tenses in indirect speech ==
=== A table of tenses ===
When a sentence is made indirect, the verbs generally change either to the infinitive or the subjunctive mood. There are fewer tenses in the infinitive than in the indicative, so sometimes the same infinitive tense can be interpreted as a transformation of more than one indicative tense; for example, the perfect infinitive can reflect the perfect, pluperfect, or imperfect indicative. There is also no distinction between the logical future condition ('if this happens') and the ideal future condition ('if this were to happen'). Further details are given in the sections below.

The following table summarises how the tense of the main verb of a quoted sentence changes when it is made indirect:

Event or situation	Indirect statement	Indirect qu. (primary)	Indirect qu. (historic)
Contemporaneous	Present infinitive	Present subjunctive	Imperfect subjunctive
Past	Perfect infinitive Perfect participle + esse	Perfect subjunctive Perfect participle + sit	Pluperfect subjunctive Perfect participle + esset
Doubly past	Perfect participle + fuisse	Perfect participle + fuerit	(not found)
Future perfect	Perfect participle + fore (fore ut + perf./pluperf. subj.)	Perfect subjunctive Perfect participle + futūrum sit	(not found)
Vivid or ideal future	Future participle + esse; Supine + īrī; fore ut + pres./imperf. subj.	Future participle + sit (or Pres. subjunctive)	Future participle + esset (or Imperf. subjunctive)
Unreal conditional (would / would have)	Future participle + fuisse	Future participle + fuerit	Future participle + fuerit (Future participle + fuisset)

The categories 'doubly past' and 'future perfect' above are only found with passive and deponent verbs.

=== Tenses of the infinitive ===
==== Contemporaneous situation ====
A present infinitive in indirect speech usually represents a situation contemporaneous with the introductory verb, whether the main verb is present or past tense. In the following examples, the verb in direct speech would have been present tense (e.g. hostēs adsunt):

hostēs adesse nūntiātum est (Livy)
'it was announced that the enemy were present.'

sēnsit sē petī (Nepos)
'he realised that he was being sought'

However, the verb meminī 'I remember', when the sentence describes a personal reminiscence, is an exception to the rule given above, in that the present infinitive is used even though it refers to an event earlier than the introductory verb:

meminī mē adesse (Cicero)
'I remember being present'

==== Earlier event or situation ====
If the reported sentence describes an event or situation earlier than the introductory verb, the perfect infinitive is used. This applies whether the main verb is in the present tense or one of the past tenses:

Hirtius mihī dīxit sē ad eum scrīpsisse (Cicero)
'Hirtius told me that he had written to him'

mihī nūntiāvit M. Marcellum pugiōne percussum esse et duo vulnera accēpisse (Servius to Cicero)
'he brought me news that Marcus Marcellus had been stabbed with a dagger and had received two wounds'

sē ā Mārcellō ad mē missum esse (Servius to Cicero)
'(he said that) he had been sent to me by Marcellus'

caput arsisse ferunt multōrum in cōnspectū (Livy)
'they say that his head caught fire while many people were watching'

The perfect infinitive can also represent an imperfect indicative in the original sentence. In the following example vīxisse is equivalent to the imperfect tense vīvēbat in direct speech:

dīcitur eō tempore mātrem Pausaniae vīxisse (Nepos)
'it is said that at that time the mother of Pausanias was still living'

In the following example, to emphasise the idea of habitual action, a frequentative verb factitō 'I do often' is used:

quod factitāsse Alexandrum legimus Magnum (Ammianus)
'which is something that we read Alexander the Great frequently used to do'

If the infinitive is passive (e.g. interfectum esse), the auxiliary verb esse can sometimes be omitted:

frātrem interfectum audīvit (Seneca)
'he heard that his brother had been killed'

nūntiātum est Cōnstantīnopolim terrae pulsū vibrātam (Ammianus)
'it was reported that Constantinople had been shaken by an earthquake'

==== Perfect participle with fuisse ====
Occasionally a perfect passive infinitive is found formed with fuisse instead of the usual esse. This usually refers to a situation that existed at a certain time in the past resulting from an earlier event:

quod iūdicium cum agerētur, exercitum in forō collocātum ā Gn. Pompeiō fuisse ...ex ōrātiōne appāret (Asconius)
'it appears from the speech that while the trial was in progress, an army had been stationed in the forum by Gnaeus Pompeius'

tūn mēd indūtum fuisse pallam praedicās? (Plautus)
'are you saying that (at the time when you saw me) I was wearing (lit. was dressed in) a lady's mantle?'

satis est ... docēre magnam eī spem in Milōnis morte prōpositam ... fuisse (Cicero)
'it is sufficient to show that (at the time Clodius was murdered) great hope had been placed for him in Milo's death'

In other examples the participle refers to a situation that existed up until a certain time in the past, but which changed later:

Zanclē quoque iūncta fuisse dīcitur Ītaliae, dōnec cōnfīnia pontus abstulit (Ovid)
'Zancle (= Messina in Sicily) too is said to have been formerly joined to Italy, until the sea took away the common boundary'

cognōvī tibi eum falsō suspectum fuisse (Cicero)
'I found out that (until you got to know him better) he had previously been unfairly suspected by you'

populum Tanaquil adloquitur ... sōpītum fuisse rēgem subitō ictū; ... iam ad sē redīsse (Livy)
'Tanaquil addressed the people: she said that the king had been knocked unconscious by the sudden blow, but he had now recovered'

For further examples see Latin tenses#Perfect infinitive with fuisse.

==== Later event or situation ====
If an indirect statement describes an event or situation later than the introductory verb, the future infinitive is used. This consists of the future participle + esse, if active, or the supine + īrī if passive. The future participle is an adjective, and so changes for number and gender:

sēque ad tē litterās datūrōs esse dīxērunt (Cicero)
'and they said that they were going to send a letter to you'

The infinitive esse is often omitted:

iussit mihī nūntiāri mox sē ventūrum (Cicero)
'he ordered a message to be taken to me that he was going to come soon'

A future passive infinitive can be made using the supine with īrī (the passive infinitive of the verb eō 'I go'). Since the supine is a verbal noun, the ending -um does not change with gender or number:

rūmor venit datum īrī gladiātōres (Terence)
'a rumour comes that a gladiatorial show is going to be given'

ante reditum eius negōtium cōnfectum īrī putō (Cicero)
'I think that the business will be completed before his return'

The verb sum has its own future infinitive fore, equivalent to futūrum esse:

comitia fore non arbitror (Cicero)
'I don't think there will be an election'

in litterīs scrībit sē cum legiōnibus profectum celeriter adfore (Caesar)
'in the letter he wrote that he had set out with the legions and would soon be there'

Fore can also be used in the phrase fore ut (occasionally futūrum esse ut or futūrum ut) followed by a present or imperfect subjunctive to report a future event. This can be used with an active or a passive verb:

respondērunt Chaldaeī fore ut imperāret mātremque occīderet (Tacitus)
'the astrologers replied that (Nero) would become Emperor, and that he would kill his mother'

omnēs id fore putābant ut miser virgīs caederētur (Cicero)
'they all thought that the poor man was going to be beaten with the rods'

futūrum esse, nisī prōvīsum esset, ut Rōma caperētur (Cicero)
'the voice said that, unless some precaution was taken, Rome would be captured'

The participle futūrum can be used alone without esse:

quod sī animō strēnuō fēcissent, futūrum ut adversāriī non possent resistere (Nepos)
(he said that) it they did this energetically, the enemy would not be able to resist'

The verb possum has no future infinitive, but the infinitive posse can sometimes refer to a future time relative to the main verb.

spērat posse fierī ut mēcum in Italiam dēcēdat (Cicero)
'he hopes it is going to be possible for him to leave for Italy with me'

In indirect commands and after verbs of will, the simple present infinitive has a future meaning. Thus in the first of the sentences below, the future infinitive is used in an accusative and infinitive construction, but in the second, the simple present infinitive is used with no accusative:

L. Lentulus cōnsul rēī pūblicae sē nōn dēfutūrum pollicētur (Caesar)
'Lucius Lentulus the consul promised that he would not fail the Republic'

Pompeiō esse in animō rēī pūblicae non dēesse (Caesar)
'(he said that) Pompey was determined not to fail the Republic'

==== Future perfect situation ====
If the main verb of a reported statement is a reflection of a future perfect tense in direct speech, it cannot be expressed using an active verb, but it is possible to use a passive or deponent perfect participle with fore:

Carthāginiēsēs dēbellātum mox fore rēbantur (Livy)
'the Carthaginians thought that the war would soon be ended.'

metum sī quī sūstulisset, omnem vītae dīligentiam sublātam fore (Cicero)
'(philosophers say that) if someone removed fear, all carefulness of life would have been removed too'

hoc possum dīcere, mē satis adeptum fore, sī nūllum in mē perīculum redundārit. (Cicero)
'I can say this, that I will have achieved enough, if no danger redounds on me.'

Very rarely a future perfect of direct speech can be represented in an indirect statement by fore ut followed by a perfect or pluperfect subjunctive:

spērābam, cum hās litterās accēpissēs, fore ut ea quae superiōribus litterīs ā tē petīssēmus impetrāta essent (Cicero)
'I was hoping that by the time you received this letter, the requests which I requested from you in my earlier letter would have been granted' (Epistolary imperfect = 'I hope that...')

As the last two examples above illustrate, in a subordinate clause in ōrātiō oblīqua the future perfect tense usually becomes either the perfect subjunctive (redundārit) or pluperfect subjunctive (accēpissēs), according to whether the tense of the introductory verb is primary or historic. In a few cases, however, when the introductory verb is in the 1st or 2nd person, the future perfect indicative is retained.

==== Ideal potential situations ====
The distinction between the ideal conditional ('if this were to happen') and the simple future conditional ('if this happens') disappears in indirect speech). Thus in an indirect statement, the future participle is used, just as with a future logical conditional:

ait sē sī ūrātur 'quam hoc suāve!' dictūrum (Cicero)
'he says that if he were being burnt, he would say "how pleasant this is!"'

In the following indirect statement, the future infinitive of sum is combined with a gerundive to express what would happen in a hypothetical future situation:

senēscendum fore tantum terrārum vel sine proeliō obeuntī (Curtius)
'(he had written that) a person would inevitably grow old just visiting such a huge country, even without fighting a battle'

==== Present unreal situations ====
If a reported statement depends on a situation contrary to fact, the verb takes the form of a future participle + fuisse, which is known as the periphrastic perfect infinitive. The following examples illustrate a present unreal (contrary to fact) situation:

fatentur sē virtūtis causā, nisi ea voluptātem faceret, nē manum quidem versūrōs fuisse (Cicero)
'they confess that they would not lift a hand for the sake of virtue, unless virtue itself gave pleasure'

an tū cēnsēs ūllam anum tam dēlīram futūram fuisse ut somniīs crēderet, nisī ista cāsū nōn nunquam forte temerē concurrerent? (Cicero)
'do you think any old woman would be so crazy as to believe in dreams if they didn't come true by chance sometimes?'

quid putāmus passūrum fuisse sī vīveret? – nobīscum cēnāret! (Pliny)
'what do we think would be happening to him if he were alive?' – 'he would be dining with us!'

As illustrated above, in an unreal conditional, the imperfect or pluperfect tense of the subjunctive in the protasis '(if' clause) remains unchanged, even after a primary tense verb.

==== Past unreal events and situations ====
Exactly the same construction with the future participle plus fuisse can also refer to a past situation contrary to fact:

nōn vidētur mentītūrus fuisse, nisī dēspērāsset. (Quintilian)
'it is unlikely that he would have told a lie unless he had been desperate.'

hoc tamen nūntiā, melius mē moritūram fuisse sī nōn in fūnere meō nūpsissem (Livy)
'but take this message to him, that I would have died better if I had not married on the day of my funeral!'

Just as fore ut is used to make a future passive infinitive, so futūrum fuisse ut can occasionally be used to make a potential passive infinitive. However, this is very rare, and only two instances have been noted:

nisi eō ipsō tempore quīdam nūntiī dē Caesaris victōriā essent allātī, exīstimābant plērīque futūrum fuisse utī āmitterētur (Caesar)
'if at that very moment certain reports had not been brought of Caesar's victory, most people reckoned that the town would have been lost'

The perfect infinitive of possum can also be used in the main clause of an unreal past conditional, that is, to write 'could have done' instead of 'would have done', since the two are close in meaning:

at plerīque exīstimant, sī ācrius īnsequī voluisset, bellum eō diē potuisse fīnīrī (Caesar)
'but most people think that if he had been prepared to follow up the pursuit more vigorously, the war could have been finished on that day'

=== Indirect questions ===
Indirect questions in Latin use the subjunctive mood. Following the sequence of tenses rule, primary tenses (present, perfect, periphrastic future) are used when the context is primary, and historic tenses (imperfect, pluperfect, and imperfect periphrastic future) when the context is historic. Similar tenses are usually used after the phrase nōn dubitō quīn 'I do not doubt'. However, when the introductory verb is a historic present, or where there is no introductory verb, the writer has a choice, and can use either primary or historic sequence, or even a mixture of the two.

The periphrastic tenses with the future participle are used only in indirect questions and after nōn dubitō quīn 'I do not doubt that'. In other kinds of indirect sentences (e.g. after verbs of command or fearing) the present or imperfect subjunctive are used with a future meaning.

For the most part in subordinate clauses in ōrātiō oblīqua, the verb is in one of the four basic subjunctive tenses (present, imperfect, perfect, pluperfect); the periphrastic subjunctive is not usually used.

==== Contemporaneous situation ====
If the sentence is an indirect question referring to the same time as the main verb, the present subjunctive is normally used after a primary tense verb:

quaerunt ā mē ubi sit pecūnia (Cicero)
'they are asking me where the money is'

The present subjunctive after nōn dubitō quīn would also normally refer to a current situation:

nōn dubitō quīn sciās cuius mūnicipī sim (Cicero)
'I am sure you know what town I am from'

However, sometimes, the present subjunctive after nōn dubitō quīn can refer to a future event (see examples below).

When the verb of speaking is in a historic tense, the imperfect subjunctive is used:

quaesīvit unde esset epistula (Cicero)
'he asked where the letter was from'

nec dubitāvēre Persae quīn Macedones fugerent (Curtius)
'nor did the Persians doubt that the Macedonians were fleeing.'

==== Deliberative subjunctive ====
A present or imperfect subjunctive can also represent a deliberative subjunctive ('what are we to do?') in direct speech:

neque satis cōnstābat quid agerent (Caesar)
'nor was it very clear what they ought to do'

==== Earlier event or situation ====
In indirect questions, after a primary tense verb, an event earlier than the verb of speaking is usually represented by the perfect subjunctive:

rogās quae castra vīderit. (Cicero)
'you ask what military service he has seen.'

With the perfect subjunctive in indirect questions there is sometimes some ambiguity, since this tense can also represent an imperfect or pluperfect tense of direct speech:

quid lēgātī ēgerint nōndum scīmus (Cicero)
'we do not yet know what the ambassadors have done' (or 'were doing', or 'did', or 'had done')

When the introductory verb is in a historic tense, the pluperfect subjunctive is used:

herī mīrābar quid accidisset (Cicero)
'yesterday I was wondering what had happened'

nōn dubitābāmus quīn tū iam Brundisium pervēnissēs (Cicero)
'we were sure that you had already reached Brundisium'

The pluperfect subjunctive can also be a reflection of an original imperfect tense. In the following example, according to Woodcock, the original verbs would have been mīlitābāmus and habēbāmus:

[dīxit eōs] id tantum dēprecārī, nē īnferiōrēs iīs ōrdinēs quam quōs cum mīlitāssent habuissent adtribuantur (Livy)
'[he said] that they begged just one favour, that they should be not assigned lower ranks than those which they had held when they were serving in the army'

In the following examples, in the second verb the 'double' perfect subjunctive passive made with fuerit is used, to refer to an earlier situation than the time of the first verb:

id utrum parum ex intervallō sit cōnspectum, an dolus aliquis suspectus fuerit, incompertum est (Livy)
'whether this was noticed too late, or whether some trick was (already) suspected, is unknown'

id utrum suā sponte fēcerint an quia mandātum ita fuerit nōn certum est (Livy)
'whether they did this of their own accord or whether it was because they already had instructions to do so is not certain'

==== Later event or situation ====
In an indirect question referring to an event or situation later than the main verb, the future participle is combined with the present subjunctive of sum:

quid ille factūrus sit incertum est (Cicero)
'it is uncertain what he is going to do'

nec dubitō quīn mihī placitūra sit (Cicero)
'I am sure that I am going to like it' (viz. your play)

nōn dubitō quīn impetrātūrus sīs (Cicero)
'I am sure that you will be granted your request.'

After a historic verb, sit changes to the imperfect esset:

monuit Crassum quid ēventūrum esset, nisi cāvisset (Cicero)
'he warned Crassus what would happen, if he wasn't careful'

The subjunctive foret, standing for futūrum esset, can sometimes be found in such indirect questions referring to the future:

pars stāre incertī utrum prōgredī an regredī in castra tūtius foret (Livy)
'some were standing still, uncertain whether it would be safer to go forward or to retreat into the camp'

However, after nōn dubitō quīn sometimes the simple subjunctive alone can also have a future meaning, if the context makes it clear. This is in fact necessary if the verb is passive, since there is no passive future participle:

nōn dubitō quīn, quoad plānē valeās, tē neque nāvigātiōnī neque viae committās (Cicero)
'I am sure that you will not commit yourself to sailing or travelling until you are completely better'

nec dubitō quīn, tē sī prōsequar, arma parentur (Ovid)
'nor do I doubt that if I follow you, arms will be prepared'

nōn dubitō quīn ad tē statim veniam (Cicero)
'I am sure I shall come to you immediately'

haec sī Ariovistō nūntiāta sint, nōn dubitāre quīn dē omnibus supplicium sūmat (Caesar)
'they said that if these things were reported to Ariovistus, they did not doubt that he would punish them all'

Since in ōrātiō oblīqua there is no distinction between a future condition and an ideal one, the above sentence could also be interpreted as being an ideal conditional ('if Ariovistus were to hear of this, he would punish us all').

==== Future perfect situation ====
Almost no examples are given in grammar books of an indirect question expressing a future perfect situation using a subjunctive verb, apart from the following:

nec dubitō quīn legente tē hās litterās cōnfecta jam rēs futūra sit (Cicero)
'nor do I doubt that by the time you read this letter, the matter will already have been settled'

As with the infinitive construction, there seems to be no way of expressing a future perfect situation when the verb is active.

==== Ideal potential situation ====
The distinction between the ideal conditional ('if this were to happen') and the simple future conditional ('if this happens') disappears in indirect speech). In an indirect question about a hypothetical unreal situation, the periphrastic present subjunctive is found, just as in a logical future conditional:

quem adhūc nōs quidem vīdimus nēminem; sed philosophōrum sententiīs, quālis hic futūrus sit, sī modō aliquandō fuerit, expōnitur (Cicero)
'we ourselves have never seen such a (perfectly wise) man; but it is explained in the opinions of philosophers what such a person would be like, if one were ever to exist'

==== Present unreal situations ====
If the sentence is an indirect question, according to Woodcock, the periphrastic perfect subjunctive can be used. The following example is quoted by Woodcock as describing a hypothetical present or future situation:

cōgitā quantum additūrus celeritātī fuerīs, sī ā tergō hostis īnstāret! (Seneca)
'think how much extra speed you would put on, if an enemy were pursuing you!'

However, the following statement based on an unreal present condition uses the simple imperfect subjunctive to refer to a hypothetical future situation:

nōn dubitō quīn, si modo esset in rē pūblicā senatus, aliquandō statua huic in forō statuerētur. (Cicero)
'nor do I doubt that, if only the Senate still existed in the republic, one day a statue would be set up to this man in the forum.'

As illustrated above, in an unreal conditional, the imperfect or pluperfect tense of the subjunctive in the protasis '(if' clause) remains unchanged, even after a primary tense verb.

==== Past unreal events and situations ====
An indirect question about an unreal past situation has the future participle plus the perfect subjunctive of sum:

dīc agendum, Appī Claudī, quidnam factūrus fuerīs, sī eō tempore cēnsor fuissēs? (Livy)
'tell us, Appius Claudius, what you would have done if you had been censor at that time?'

After a historic introductory verb in an unreal conditional clause, the potential perfect subjunctive is usually still retained (contrary to the usual sequence of tenses rule):

nec dubium erat quīn, sī tam paucī simul obīre omnia possent, terga datūrī hostēs fuerint (Livy)

'nor was there any doubt that if it were possible for so few to manage everything at once, the enemy would have turned their backs'

Occasionally, however, the subjunctive becomes pluperfect, but this is rare, and found only in Livy:

subībat cōgitātiō animum quōnam modō tolerābilis futūra Etrūria fuisset, sī quid in Samniō adversī ēvēnisset (Livy)
'it occurred to them how impossible Etruria would have been, if anything had gone wrong in Samnium'

==== 'Could have done' ====
'Could have done' can be used instead of 'would have done', since the two are close in meaning. So in an indirect question it is possible to use the perfect subjunctive potuerit with the present infinitive;

quaeris quid potuerit amplius adsequī Plancius, sī Cn. Scīpionis fuisset fīlius (Cicero)
'you ask what more Plancius could/would have achieved, if he had been the son of Gnaeus Scipio'

The perfect subjunctive potuerit is usually retained even in a historic context:

haud dubium erat quīn, nisi ea mora intervēnisset, castra eō diē Pūnica capī potuerint (Livy)
'there was no doubt that if the delay had not intervened, the Carthaginian camp could/would have been captured on that day'

=== Present subjunctive in historic sequence ===
Just as in narrative, when writers often change from the perfect (or imperfect) to the historical present tense to make their writing more vivid, so in the same way the subjunctives in indirect speech sometimes use the two primary tenses (present and perfect) even when the context is past. This practice is known as repraesentātiō temporum.

Usually if the introductory verb of indirect speech is in a primary tense, the subjunctive verbs are primary, while if it is historic, the subjunctive verbs are historic. However, even in the same sentence, a writer may switch between historic and primary tenses, as in the following example, in which peterent (imperfect) is historic, despite the present tense introductory verb, but vulneret (present) and vīderit (perfect) are primary:

praecipit ut ūnum omnēs peterent Indutiomarum, neu quis quem prius vulneret quam illum interfectum vīderit (Caesar)
'he instructed that everyone was to attack Indutiomarus alone, and that no one is to wound anyone before he has seen Indutiomarus killed'

Commenting on this sentence, Postgate suggests that the change to primary tenses represents some 'sharpening of the emphasis'.

Andrewes (1937, 1951) points out that different authors have different practices in regard to the use of primary and historic tenses in indirect speech. Cicero generally follows the sequence of tenses, but this is not always true of Caesar. In some examples Caesar seems to use the present subjunctive to refer to a future time, and the imperfect to refer to the current situation. Thus in the following examples, sequātur and liceat are in the present subjunctive because they refer to a future time:

quod sī praetereā nēmō sequātur, tamen sē cum sōlā decimā legiōne itūrum, dē quā nōn dubitāret (Caesar)
'moreover, even if no one else were to follow him, he would go with the tenth legion alone, about whose loyalty he had no doubt.'

esse in animō iter per prōvinciam facere, proptereā quod aliud iter habērent nūllum: rogāre ut eius voluntāte id sibī facere liceat (Caesar)
'(the ambassadors said that) the Helvetii were intending to make a journey through the province, because they had no other route; and that they were requesting that it might be allowed for them to do so with Caesar's permission'

In Livy and Tacitus, on the other hand, the tense of the reported verb tends to follow the tense of the indicative of direct speech; thus in the following example, a perfect indicative turns into a perfect subjunctive (āfuerit), and an imperfect indicative into an imperfect subjunctive (peteret):

adgressūrum fuisse hesternō diē in conciliō; dīlātam rem esse, quod auctor conciliī āfuerit quem maximē peteret (Livy)
'(he said that) he would have made an attack the previous day in the council, but the matter had been postponed, since the convenor of the council had been absent, whom in particular he had been aiming for.'

However, when the original verb in direct speech is subjunctive, these authors follow the sequence of tenses rule. In the following sentence of Tacitus, the present subjunctive dūcātur represents a present indicative, but the imperfects spectāret and compōneret, following the historic introductory verb, represent present subjunctives in direct speech:

nunc quia nōn metū dūcātur, itūrum ut praesentia spectāret compōneretque (Tacitus)
'but now that he was not being induced by fear, he would go so that he could look at the situation and make a settlement.'

The use of primary and historic subjunctives in this example from Tacitus differs from the preceding examples from Caesar, since in Tacitus the present subjunctive refers to the current situation, and the imperfect to future time. However, Caesar is not always consistent, and Postgate observes that as far as the future and future perfect of direct speech when transferred to ōrātiō oblīqua are concerned, 'the usage of Caesar appears to be irreducible to general rules'.

=== Indicative in subordinate clauses ===
Although the verb in a subordinate clause in ōrātiō oblīqua is usually in the subjunctive mood, when the verb of speaking is 1st or 2nd person, the indicative can be used:

spērō, sī absolūtus erit, coniūnctiōrem illum nōbīs fore in ratiōne petītiōnis (Cicero)
'I hope that if (Catiline) is acquitted, he will work more closely with me in my election campaign'

vereor nē cum tē vīderō omnia oblīvīscar (Cicero)
'I'm afraid that once I see you I may forget everything'

The present indicative can also be retained after dum:

dīc, hospes, Spartae nōs tē hīc vīdisse iacentīs, dum sānctīs patriae lēgibus obsequimur (Cicero)
'tell them, stranger, at Sparta that you have seen us lying here while we obey the sacred laws of our country'

A relative clause which is merely explanatory also uses the indicative:

quis neget haec omnia quae vidēmus deōrum immortālium potestāte administrārī? (Cicero)
'who would deny that all these things which we see are ruled by the power of the immortal gods?'

The use of the indicative is more common after a primary tense introductory verb than a historic one, and also sometimes in cases where the use of the subjunctive might cause ambiguity.

== Extended passages of indirect speech ==
Roman writers, especially historians, often use quite extensive passages of indirect speech. An example is the following, which is from a letter by an ex-consul Servius Sulpicius Rufus to Cicero:

circiter hōrā decimā noctis P. Postumius, familiāris eius, ad mē vēnit et mihī nūntiāvit M. Mārcellum, conlēgam nostrum, post cēnae tempus ā P. Magiō Cīlōne, familiāre eius, pugiōne percussum esse et duo vulnera accēpisse, ūnum in stomachō, alterum in capite secundum aurem; spērārī tamen eum vīvere posse; Magium sē ipsum interfēcisse posteā; sē ā Mārcellō ad mē missum esse, quī haec nūntiāret et rogāret utī medicōs eī mitterem. (Servius Sulpicius Rufus)

'Around the tenth hour of the night, Publius Postumius, a friend of his, came to me and reported to me that Marcus Marcellus, our colleague, after dinner time had been stabbed with a dagger by Publius Magius Cilo, a friend of his, and had received two wounds, one in the stomach and the other on the head, behind his ear; it was hoped, however, that he would be able to live; Magius had killed himself afterwards; he himself had been sent to me by Marcellus to report these things and to ask me to send some doctors for him.'

The whole passage above, which mainly consists of indirect statements, is dependent on the verb nūntiāvit 'he reported'. That it is indirect is shown by the fact that most of the verbs have been changed to infinitives (shown in bold), while the subjects of the verbs Mārcellum, Magium are put into the accusative case. The last clause, with its imperfect subjunctive (ut ... mitterem 'that I should send'), is an indirect command.

Many passages of indirect speech are found in Julius Caesar's commentaries. The following is typical:

eī lēgātiōnī Ariovistus respondit: sī quid ipsī ā Caesare opus esset, sēsē ad eum ventūrum fuisse; sī quid ille sē velit, illum ad sē venire oportēre; praetereā sē neque sine exercitū in eās partēs Galliae venīre audēre quās Caesar possidēret, neque exercitum sine magnō commeātū atque mōlīmentō in ūnum locum contrahere posse; sibī autem mīrum vidērī quid in suā Galliā, quam bellō vīcisset, aut Caesarī aut omnīnō populō Rōmānō negōtiī esset. (Caesar)

'To this embassy Ariovistus replied: if he himself had been in need of Caesar, he would have come to him; if Caesar were to require anything of him, he, Caesar, ought to come to him. Besides, he did not dare to come without an army into those parts of Gaul which Caesar possessed, nor was it possible for him to gather an army into one location without a large supply train and effort. Moreover, it seemed to him strange what business either Caesar or the Roman People as a whole had in his own part of Gaul, which he had conquered in war.'

The passage consists of five indirect statements with infinitive verbs (two of which, oportēre 'it is fitting' and vidērī 'it seems' are impersonal and have no subject), and an indirect question with the subjunctive (quid ... esset). Interleaved with these are two conditional clauses (sī esset ... sī velit) and two relative clauses (quās possidēret ... quam vīcisset), all of which use the subjunctive mood. All the subjunctive verbs are imperfect or pluperfect, except for velit, which is present subjunctive and thus breaks the sequence of tenses rule.

== Direct speech (ōrātiō rēcta) ==
In Latin historians, ōrātiō oblīqua is very common. In Caesar's commentaries, there are some 190 instances of indirect speech, but only 21 examples of direct speech (ōrātiō rēcta). The direct speeches tend to be quite short, although there are some longer ones, such as Curio's speech to his troops before a battle. Quite often they mark dramatic moments, including several speeches made just before a battle, such as Caesar's own speech before the battle of Pharsalia, or the eagle-bearer's encouragement to his comrades before leaping into the sea when Caesar's invading force reached the coast of Britain. In some cases they are accompanied by phrases such as vōce magnā 'with a great voice'. It is likely that during a public recitation of the work, such passages allowed the reciter to add extra drama to the recitation.

In Livy too, direct speech is found sparingly but at dramatic moments. These include the words of the Delphic oracle announcing the future ruler of Rome, the words of the heroines Lucretia and Sophonisba before they committed suicide, and the announcement to the people of the tragedy of Lake Trasimene.

== Bibliography ==
- Andrewes, M. (1937). "Caesar's Use of Tense Sequence in Indirect Speech". The Classical Review, Vol. 51, No. 4 (September 1937), pp. 114–116.
- Andrewes, M. (1951). "The Function of Tense Variation in the Subjunctive Mood of Oratio Obliqua". The Classical Review, New Series, Vol. 1, No. 3/4 (December 1951), pp. 142–146.
- Gildersleeve, B. L. & Gonzalez Lodge (1895). Gildersleeve's Latin Grammar. 3rd Edition. (Macmillan)
- Goodrich, W. J. "On the Prospective Use of the Latin Imperfect Subjunctive in Relative Clauses". The Classical Review, Vol. 31, No. 3/4 (May – June 1917), pp. 83–86.
- Greenough, J. B. et al. (1903). Allen and Greenough's New Latin Grammar for Schools and Colleges. Boston and London.
- Ker, James (2007). "Roman Repraesentatio". American Journal of Philology, Vol. 128, No. 3 (Autumn, 2007), pp. 341–365.
- Nordling, John G. (2006). "Caesar's Pre-Battle Speech at Pharsalus (B.C. 3.85.4): Ridiculum Acri Fortius ... Secat Res" The Classical Journal, Vol. 101, No. 2 (December – January 2005/2006), pp. 183–189.
- Pinkster, Harm (1990), Latin Syntax and Semantics, especially ch. 7.
- Postgate, J. P. (1905). "Repraesentatio Temporum in the Oratio Obliqua of Caesar". The Classical Review, Vol. 19, No. 9 (December 1905), pp. 441–446.
- Salmon, E. T. (1931). "A Note on Subordinate Clauses in Oratio Obliqua". The Classical Review, Vol. 45, No. 5 (November 1931), p. 173.
- Terrell, Glanville (1904). "The Apodosis of the Unreal Condition in Oratio Obliqua in Latin". American Journal of Philology, Vol. 25, No. 1 (1904), pp. 59–73.
- Viti, Carlotta (2010). "The non-literal use of tenses in Latin, with particular reference to the praesens historicum". Revue de linguistique latine du Centre Alfred Ernout. (Posted at Zurich Open Repository and Archive, University of Zurich).
- Woodcock, E.C. (1959), A New Latin Syntax.
