= De Bello Alexandrino =

Latin work detailing Caesar's campaigns in Alexandria and Asia

de Bello Alexandrino (On the Alexandrian War)
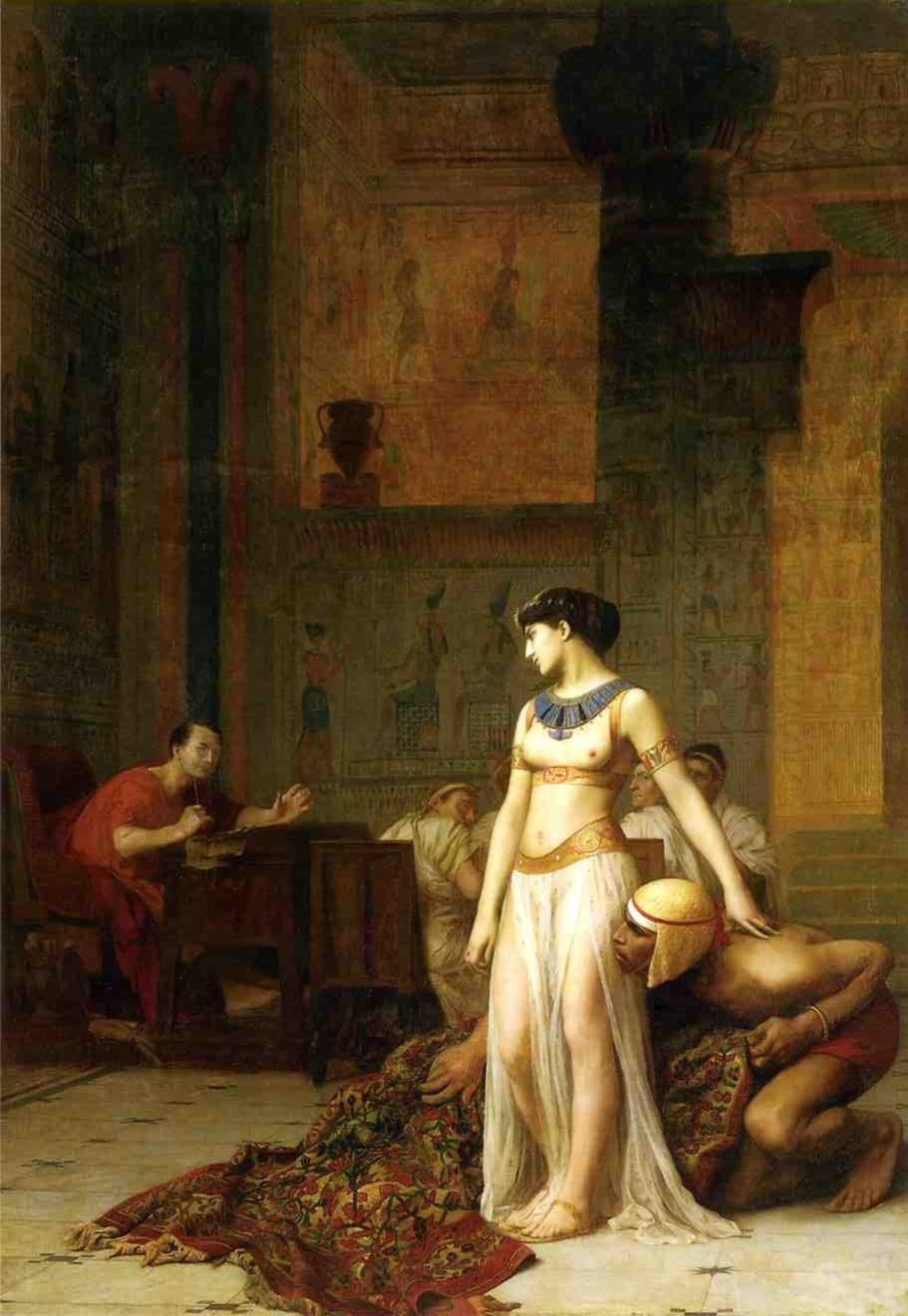
- Cleopatra and Caesar by Jean-Léon Gérôme, 1866.
- Author: Unknown
- Language: Classical Latin
- Subject: History, military history
- Publication date: approx. 40 BC
- Preceded by: Commentarii de Bello Civili
- Followed by: De Bello Africo

De Bello Alexandrino (also Bellum Alexandrinum; On the Alexandrine War) is a Latin work continuing Julius Caesar's commentaries, De Bello Gallico and De Bello Civili. It details Caesar's campaigns in Alexandria and Asia.

== Authorship ==
De Bello Alexandrino is followed by De Bello Africo and De Bello Hispaniensi. These three works end the Caesarean corpus relating Caesar's Civil War. Though normally collected and bound with Caesar's authentic writings, their authorship has been debated since antiquity. Suetonius suggests both Oppius and Hirtius as possible authors of De Bello Alexandrino. Alfred Klotz (1910) demonstrated in great detail that the style of De Bello Alexandrino is very similar to the style of the eighth and last book of De Bello Gallico, which is very commonly attributed to Hirtius. Thus it seems likely on stylistic grounds that if it was Hirtius who completed the Gallic Wars, it was Hirtius also who wrote De Bello Alexandrino. But if he did so, his knowledge of the campaign was second-hand, as the author of De Bello Gallico, VIII writes in the introductory chapter: "For myself, I had not the occasion to take part in the Alexandrian and African wars" (Mihi ne illud quidem accidit, ut Alexandrino atque Africano bello interessem).

A detailed analysis of the style of the Bellum Alexandrinum published in 2013 argues that "whereas the first part of the narrative of events in Alexandria (chh. 1-21) is particularly Caesarian, the conclusion of that panel (22-33), and the narratives of events in Illyricum (42-47), Spain (48-64), and Pontus (34-41, 65-78) are distinctly less so". The authors suggest that the book was put together by an author, probably Aulus Hirtius, on the basis of various sources written by other people. But they deny Hirtius's authorship of the whole work, stating: "The attribution of the Bellum Alexandrinum to Hirtius should no longer be regarded as a serious option".

A recent computer-assisted stylistic analysis of the five works in the Caesarian corpus confirms that books 1–7 of the Gallic War and 1–3 of the Civil War were written by the same author (presumably Caesar himself), but book 8 of the Gallic War, and the Alexandrian, African, and Spanish War commentaries appear to differ in style not only from Caesar's own works but also from each other; in which case, the De Bello Alexandrino would have been written by an unknown author.

== See also ==
- De Bello Africo
- De Bello Hispaniensi
- Caesar's civil war for a brief account of the campaign

== Bibliography ==
- Jean Andrieu: Guerre d’Alexandrie. Paris 1954.
- Damon, Cynthia, ed. (2022). "Bellum Alexandrinum" (PDF). Norman (Oklahoma): Library of Digital Latin Texts.
- Jan Felix Gaertner, Bianca C. Hausburg: Caesar and the Bellum Alexandrinum. An Analysis of Style, Narrative Technique, and the Reception of Greek Historiography. Göttingen 2013, ISBN 978-3-525-25300-7.
- Raphael Giomini: Bellum Alexandrinum. Rome 1956.
- Alfred Klotz: Cäsarstudien: nebst einer Analyse der Strabonischen Beschreibung von Gallien und Britannien. Leipzig/Berlin 1910.
- Gustav Landgraf: Untersuchungen zu Caesar und seinen Fortsetzern, insbesondere über Autorschaft und Komposition des Bellum Alexandrinum und Africanum. Erlangen 1888.
- Carl Nipperdey: C. Iulii Caesaris commentarii cum supplementis A. Hirtii et aliorum. Caesaris Hirtiique fragmenta. Leipzig 1847.
- Heinz Pötter: Untersuchungen zum Bellum Alexandrinum und Bellum Africanum. Stil und Verfasserfrage. Leipzig 1932.
- Rudolf Schneider: Bellum Alexandrinum. Berlin 1888.
- Zhang, Olivia R., Trevor Cohen & Scott McGill. “Did Gaius Julius Caesar Write De Bello Hispaniensi? A Computational Study of Latin Classics Authorship”. HUMAN IT 14.1 (2018): 28–58
