= Commentarii de Bello Civili =

Discussion of the Roman civil war by Julius Caesar

Commentarii de Bello Civili (Commentaries on the Civil War)
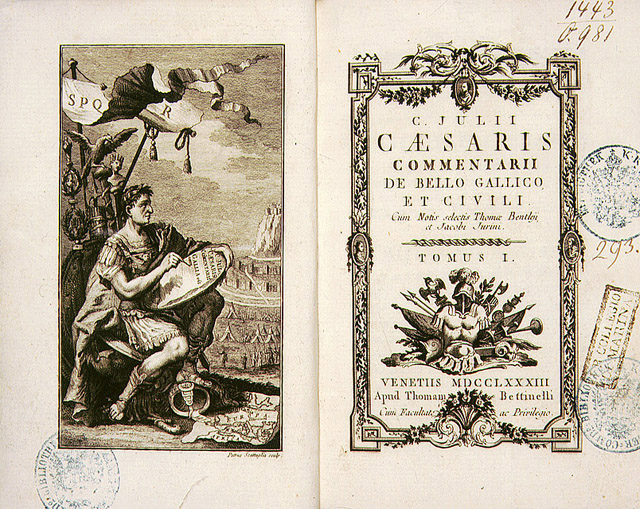
- 1783 edition of the Commentaries on the Gallic War and the Civil War
- Author: Julius Caesar
- Language: Classical Latin
- Subject: History, Military history
- Genre: Non-fiction
- Publisher: Julius Caesar
- Publication date: 46 BC
- Preceded by: Commentarii de Bello Gallico
- Followed by: de Bello Alexandrino

Commentarii de Bello Civili (Commentaries on the Civil War), or Bellum Civile, is an account written by Julius Caesar of his war against Gnaeus Pompeius and the Roman Senate. It consists of three books covering the events of 49–48 BC, from shortly before Caesar's invasion of Italy to Pompey's defeat at the Battle of Pharsalus and flight to Egypt. It was preceded by the much longer account of Caesar's campaigns in Gaul and was followed by similar works covering the ensuing wars against the remnants of Pompey's armies in Egypt, North Africa, and Spain. Caesar's authorship of the Commentarii de Bello Civili is not disputed, while the three later works are believed to have been written by contemporaries of Caesar.

== Title ==
The Latin title Commentarii de Bello Civili is often retained as the title of the book in English translations of the work. The title itself is Latin for "Commentaries on the Civil War". It is sometimes shortened to just "Civil Wars", "About the Civil Wars", and "The Civil War", in English translations.

== Background and motivations ==
Following his consulship in 59 BCE, Caesar served an unprecedented ten-year term as governor of Gallia Cisalpina, Gallia Narbonensis, and Illyricum. During this time he conducted a series of devastating military campaigns against the various groups of people inhabiting Gaul (primarily present-day France and Belgium) culminating in the Battle of Alesia and the annexation of all of Gaul. As a result of nearly ten years of conquest, Caesar had not only amassed enormous wealth but had established himself as a formidable military and political rival to Pompey. Caesar and Pompey, along with Marcus Crassus, had earlier formed a political alliance known as the First Triumvirate. This alliance had overthrown many of the formal legal institutions of the state, through their combined command of the Senate, the Centuriate Assembly and the Tribal Assembly of the Plebs. This friendship of convenience came to an end with the death of Crassus in 53 BCE, and Pompey's marriage to Cornelia Metella, the daughter of a fierce opponent of Caesar. Amid a fresh outbreak of political violence in Rome, Pompey was appointed sole consul in 52 and solidified his support among the Optimates in the Senate. Caesar, meanwhile, had concluded his conquest of Gaul and, aided by the publication of his Commentarii de Bello Gallico, had become a champion of the people. The Senate, whose authority Caesar had defied in obtaining his post as governor, recognized that Caesar posed a serious political threat and demanded that he disband his army in order to be allowed to stand for the consulship. Caesar agreed provided that Pompey do the same, but this only further enraged the Senate. As his term as governor came to an end, Pompey and the Senate demanded that Caesar disband his army and return to Rome, and they forbade him to run for consul in absentia. Knowing that he would be ruined by his political opponents without either the protection provided by his army or the immunity offered by the consulship, Caesar ignored the demands of the Senate and, by entering into Italy at the head of his army on January 10, 49 BCE, provoked the Senate to declare him an enemy of the Roman people.

In the text, Caesar presents himself as the victim of a conspiracy occurring in Rome led by his political enemies, including Gnaeus Pompeius, Scipio, and Marcus Cicero. Throughout the commentaries he presents his cause as a noble one to restore order and return peace to the Roman people, while showing how his actions were justified. He also commonly presents himself as a humane liberal on the epicurean model. Caesar omits many details of the military campaigns, focusing in large part on the larger strategic situation and the reasoning behind the actions occurring.

== Contents ==
Caesar organized his commentaries into three separate books, at that time written on individual scrolls. Each book is subdivided into numbered paragraphs. The books cover a two-year period discussing the Roman Civil War during 49 and 48 BC.

=== Book I ===
Written as a narrative, the book begins with the expiration of Caesar's term as governor of Gaul and the party dominating the Roman Senate ordering him to return to the city to face charges of misconduct and possible execution. Caesar explains how he was wronged by Pompeius and his cohorts, who refused to permit him the triumph that was traditionally permitted to victorious generals. He proceeds with his army to invade Italy from Gaul. Pompeius attempts to raise an army in southern Italy, but is forced to retreat with the army to Greece. Caesar continually points to his efforts to reach an accommodation with Pompeius, and attempts to portray Pompeius as a jealous man only interested in perpetuating a rule in which he and his inner circle control the Republic.

=== Book II ===
Caesar's lieutenant Gaius Trebonius besieges Massilia. After a long siege, the Massilians finally surrender to Caesar, who shows his typical leniency to the vanquished.

Curio sets out for Africa and establishes camp near Utica. He routs the troops of Publius Attius Varus, and the Numidian King Juba sends reinforcements to Varus. Curio is overly confident; his poor decision-making leads to his army being trapped and slaughtered by the Numidians. Juba takes several Roman senators captive.

=== Book III ===
Caesar and his army follow Pompeius across the Adriatic Sea to Greece after a mop up operation in Italy and in Spain. In Greece Pompeius initially has the stronger position, with more troops, controlling many of the strategic areas. Caesar writes a lengthy monologue about the superiority of his army of elite veterans of the pacification of Gaul, and dismisses Pompeius' tactics and the strength of his army. He points out that Pompeius' army was drawn largely from the provinces and was poorly trained. After Caesar successfully outmanoeuvred Pompeius's army in the eastern Balkans, Pompeius and his army gradually fall back into Macedonia. Caesar then writes another monologue portraying Pompeius as a coward because of his refusal to make a stand against Caesar, whose army was beginning to have supply problems, and pointed to Scipio as the primary obstacle to peace. Caesar describes Scipio as a maniacal and untrustworthy but weak villain concerned only with destroying Caesar. Scipio raises a personal army of his own from his provinces in Asia Minor and moves to reinforce Pompeius.

The book climaxes with the Battle of Pharsalus in June 48. The lengthy battle and siege resulted in a decisive victory by Caesar's army. Pompeius and his cohorts flee to other areas of the Republic in an attempt to reverse their fortunes. Caesar then leads his army across the Mediterranean Sea in pursuit of Pompeius, who had landed in Egypt. There Pompeius was murdered, according to Caesar, by the Egyptians. Caesar ends the book with an epilogue on the Egyptians' lack of justification for killing Pompeius. He then proceeds to explain his reasoning for occupying Egypt with his army, using a succession crisis among the Egyptian royal family as his pretence. The Egyptians resisted and Caesar seized the Pharos. The book ended with the line "Haec initia belli Alexandrini fuerunt." ("These things were the beginning of the Alexandrian war"). The events of the book were followed by the books Alexandrian, African and Hispanic wars, written most likely by officers of Caesar's armies.

== Criticism and revival ==
Modern historians lament the fact that Caesar omits many important details about the military events, primarily because the book is the only source known to exist for many of the events that occurred in it, but also because it was written from the unique perspective of the most powerful figure in the Republic and one of the most notable generals in human history.

The book was for a time lost, but was rediscovered in Italian city archives in the Middle Ages. The oldest known manuscripts of the commentaries date to the tenth century AD. Parts of the book have remained lost though, with at least sixteen passages known to be missing. Given its much shorter length when compared to Caesar's other works, and its abrupt ending, it is possible that he never finished the work, or that a significant part may still be missing. In 1469 the commentaries were republished in Rome, from which edition most modern copies are now derived. In 1809 Napoleon I, Emperor of the French, ordered a detailed look at the works of Caesar. The Commentarii de Bello Civili, along with his other works, were compiled into the Histoire de Jules Cesar, and served as an important history that renewed interest in Caesar. The Commentarii de Bello Civili, along with Caesar's other literary works, became staple reading for Latin studies around the world because of their quality and simplicity and because of the excellent grammar employed by Caesar in his writings.

== Sources ==
- Caesar, Gaius Julius. Commentarii de Bello Civili (in Latin). B.G. Teubner.
- Henderson, Jeffery (2006). Civil Wars. Edward's Brother's. ISBN 0-674-99043-9.
- Damon, Cynthia (2015). C. Iuli Caesaris Commentariorum libri III de bello civili (First ed.). Oxford Classical Texts. ISBN 978-0-19-965974-6.
- Damon, Cynthia (2015). Studies on the Text of Caesar's Bellum Civile (First ed.). Oxford. ISBN 978-0-19-872406-3.
- Damon, Cynthia, ed. (2016). Caesar: Civil War. Loeb Classical Library. Vol. 39. Cambridge, MA: Harvard University Press. ISBN 978-0-674-99703-5.
