= Cornelius Epicadus =

Freedman of Sulla and writer

Cornelius Epicadus (fl.1st century BC) was a Roman author, grammarian, and teacher of grammar. He was a freedman of the Roman dictator Cornelius Sulla, and his attendant (calator) in taking the auspices. He "was the live-in tutor of Sulla's son," Faustus. He is most noted for completing the memoirs of his former master. He also wrote the works De cognominibus, De metris, and other antiquarian works, now lost.
