= Carl Nipperdey =

German philologist (1821–1875)

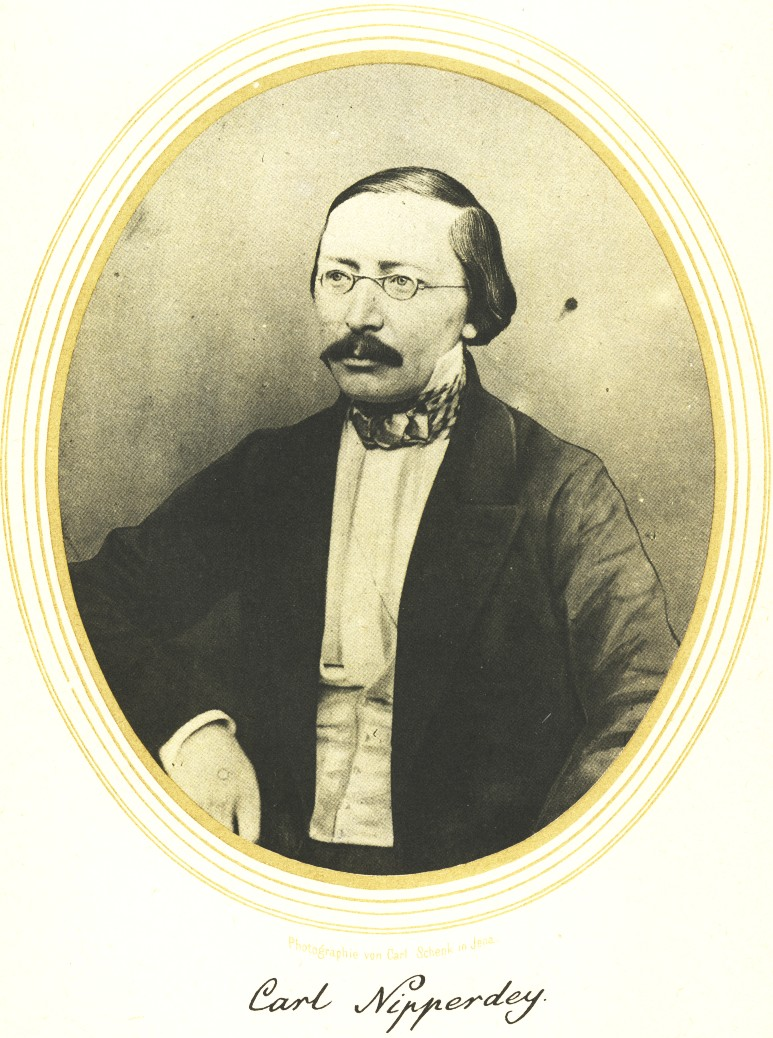
Nipperdey as photographed around 1858 by Carl W. T. Schenk

Carl Ludwig Nipperdey, also Karl Ludwig Nipperdey (September 13, 1821, in Schwerin – January 2, 1875, in Jena) was a German classical philologist.

== Life ==
Carl Nipperdey was born as the son of the painter Heinrich Nipperdey (1779–1861) in Schwerin. He initially received private lessons, mainly in Latin, and from 1834 attended the Fridericianum Schwerin. In 1840 he began studying philology in Leipzig with Moriz Haupt and Gottfried Hermann, among others, which he continued from 1843 at the University of Berlin, among others with Karl Lachmann . He received his doctorate in Berlin in 1846 with the thesis De supplementis commentariorum C. Julii Caesaris and then worked as a private scholar in Leipzig. In 1850 the habilitation on the subject followed in Leipzig Spicilegium criticum in Cornelio Nepote and then the activity as a private lecturer. He taught on Greek historiography, Roman antiquities and Sallust's De coniuratione Catilinae.

In 1852, Nipperdey was appointed to succeed Ferdinand Gotthelf Hands as associate professor for classical philology at the Friedrich Schiller University in Jena and soon became co-director of the philological seminar there. In 1854 Nipperdey was appointed full professor, on January 13, 1855, a member of the university's senate and in the summer semesters 1857 and 1861 dean of the faculty of philosophy. In the winter semester of 1857/58 he held the office of Vice Rector of the university. Since 1852 he was a full member of the Royal Saxon Society of Sciences.

In 1867, Nipperdey took over the professorship of eloquence from Karl Wilhelm Göttling, but had been relieved from holding ceremonial speeches in Latin. Nipperdey fell ill with a nerve and spinal cord disease, which got progressively worse; in January 1875 he died by suicide.

Nipperdey's grandson was the lawyer Hans Carl Nipperdey, his great-grandson was the historian Thomas Nipperdey.

== Career ==
As a classical philologist, Nipperdey specialized in Latin. He edited works by Caesar, Cornelius Nepos and Tacitus, among others. His achievements in this area were considered fundamental and he himself was considered to be an “exemplary interpreter of the most difficult Roman writers”.

== Works ==
- 1847: C. Julii Caesaris Commentarii cum supplementis A. Hirtii et aliorum. Ex rec. Car. Nipperdeii
- 1849: Cornelius Nepos. Explained by Carl Nipperdey
- 1850: Spicilegium criticum in Cornelio Nepote (habilitation thesis)
- 1852: Cornelius Tacitus. Annales (2 volumes)
- 1865: About the leges annales of the Roman Republic
- 1871: Tacitus. Opera, Partes 1–4 (with Rudolf Schöll )
- 1877: Opuscula (posthumous)

His 1847 work, an examination of Commentarii de Bello Gallico, was considered a "monumental" work in the field, and greatly influenced future writers. While it undertook one of the first modern critical analyses of Cesar's work, it was still part of a tradition of Caesarian infallibility. It considered that Caesar had written a true and unerring account, and gave Caesar the benefit of the doubt when the text contradicted itself. Modern writers have generally concluded that Caesar's story was more propaganda than truth.
