= De Bello Hispaniensi =

Latin book about Caesar's civil war in the Iberian Peninsula

De Bello Hispaniensi (On the War in Hispania)
- Author: Unknown
- Language: Classical Latin
- Subject: History, military history
- Publisher: Unknown
- Publication date: approx. 40 BC
- Preceded by: De Bello Africo

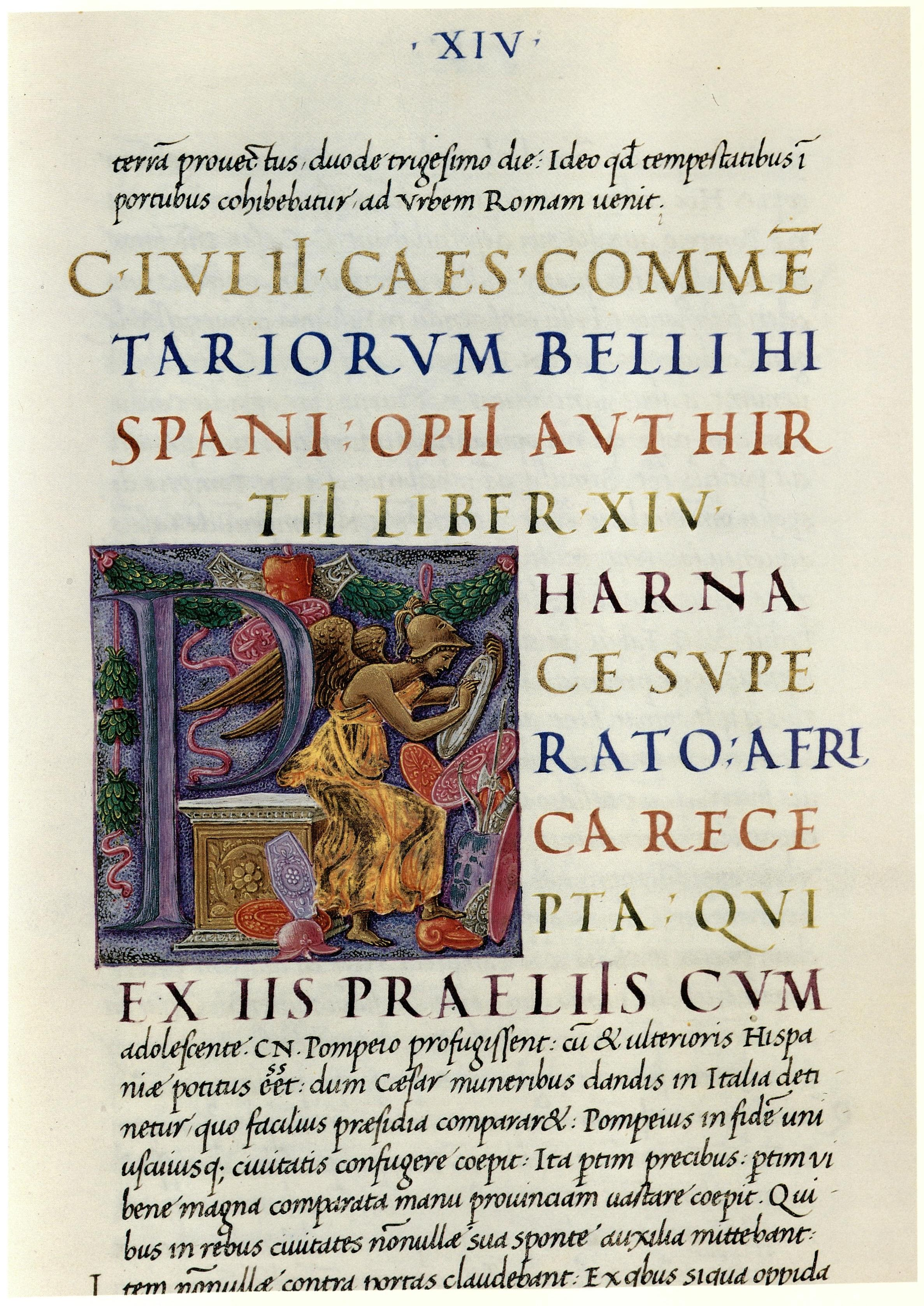
A manuscript of De bello Hispaniensi: Rome, Biblioteca Casanatense, 453, fol. 199r (late 15th century)

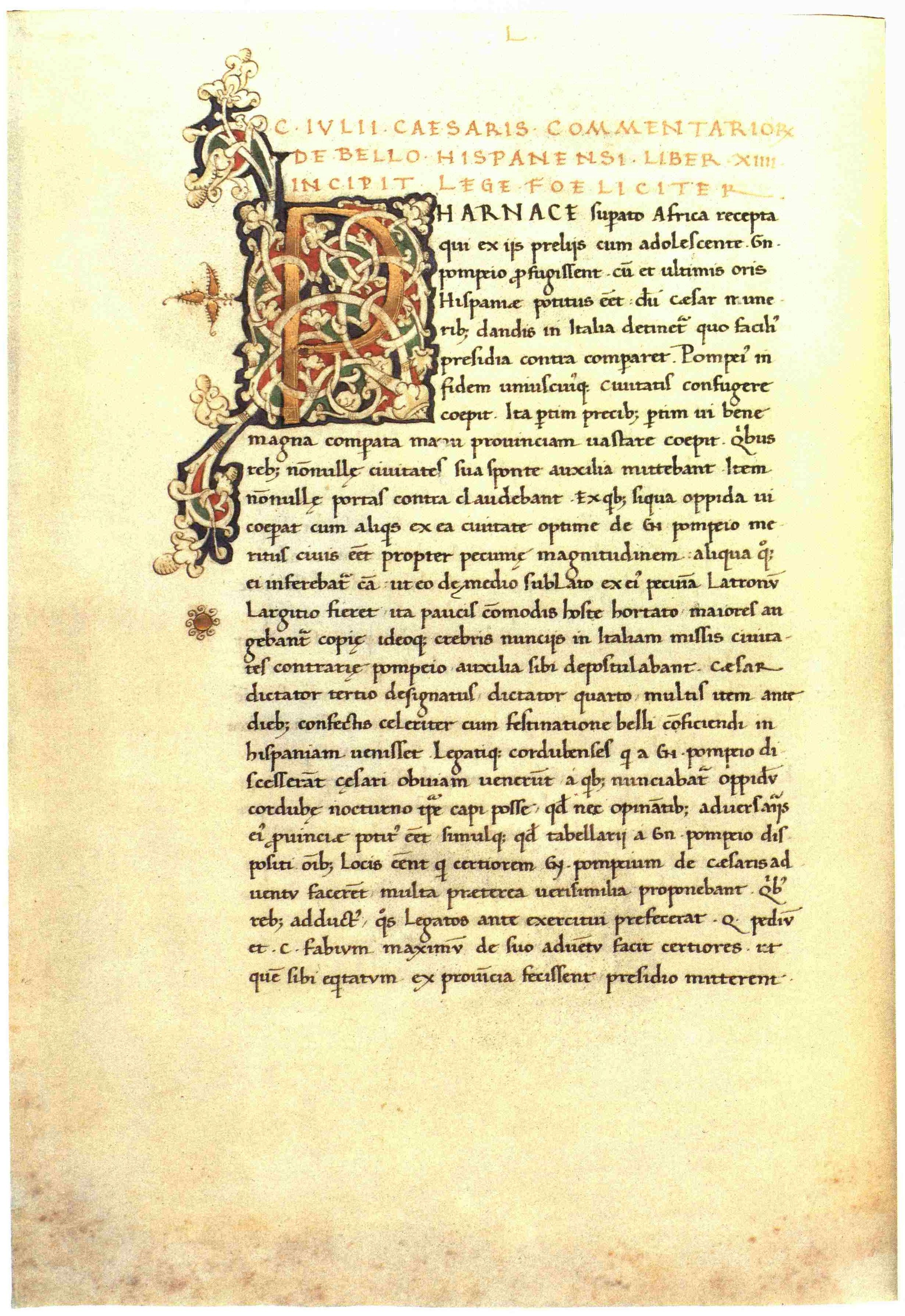
A page of a manuscript of De bello Hispaniensi: Budapest, Egyetemi Könyvtár, Cod. Lat. 11 (ca. 1460/1470)

De Bello Hispaniensi (also Bellum Hispaniense; On the Hispanic War; On the Spanish War) is a Latin work continuing Julius Caesar's commentaries, De Bello Gallico and De Bello Civili, and its sequels by two different unknown authors De Bello Alexandrino and De Bello Africo. It details Caesar's campaigns on the Iberian Peninsula, ending with the Battle of Munda.

== Authorship ==
De Bello Hispaniensi is preceded by De Bello Alexandrino and De Bello Africo. These three works end the Caesarean corpus relating Caesar's civil war. Though normally collected and bound with Caesar's authentic writings, their authorship has been debated since antiquity. One very plausible theory favors Hirtius as the author of De Bello Alexandrino (see there for details). But due to considerable differences in style, scholarly consensus has ruled out Hirtius or Julius Caesar as the authors of the two last parts. It has been suggested that these were in fact rough drafts prepared at the request of Hirtius by two separate soldiers who fought in the respective campaign; and had he survived, Hirtius would have worked them up into more effective literary form.

Regarding De Bello Hispaniensi T. Rice Holmes writes: "Bellum Hispaniense is the worst book in Latin literature; and its text is the most deplorable. The language is generally ungrammatical and often unintelligible. The copyists performed their tasks so ill that in the forty-two paragraphs there are twenty-one gaps and six hundred corrupt passages, which Mommsen and lesser men have striven with an industry worthy of a better cause to restore."

About the author, A.G. Way ventures that "Macaulay's guess that he was some 'sturdy old centurion who fought better than he wrote' is possibly not far off the truth".

Van Hooff (1974), however, disagrees; in his view the author is more likely to have been a politician such as one of Caesar's legates Quintus Pedius or Quintus Fabius Maximus rather than a professional soldier, although not necessarily either of these, since the writer shows experience of African customs and so had probably visited Africa. At any rate, the work is interesting for the fact that it gives a contemporary view of Caesar not written by Caesar himself.

Storch (1977) also disagrees. In his view the author was almost certainly a cavalry officer present in the war. He points out that "the writer of the Bellum Hispaniense had an unusual interest in cavalry. The most obvious examples relate to his continued reporting of cavalry skirmishes even when of ridiculously minor importance." In this the book is markedly different from Caesar's own commentaries and the de Bello Alexandrino, in which details of cavalry numbers and actions are few. From the detailed descriptions of topography, the information about the weather, and the numbers of casualties recorded even when very small, it is clear that he was also an eye-witness to the events described.

A recent computer-assisted stylistic analysis by Zhang and others (2018) of the five works in the Caesarian corpus confirms that books 1–7 of the Gallic War and 1–3 of the Civil War were written by the same author (presumably Caesar himself), but book 8 of the Gallic War, and the Alexandrian, African, and Spanish War commentaries appear to differ in style not only from Caesar's own works but also from each other.

== See also ==
- Commentarii de Bello Gallico
- Commentarii de Bello Civili
- De Bello Alexandrino
- De Bello Africo
- Caesar's civil war for an account of the campaign
