= De Bello Africo =

Book

De Bello Africo (On the War in Africa)
- Author: Unknown
- Language: Classical Latin
- Subject: History, military history
- Publisher: Unknown
- Publication date: approx. 40 BC
- Preceded by: De Bello Alexandrino
- Followed by: De Bello Hispaniensi

De Bello Africo (also Bellum Africum; On the African War) is a Latin work attributed to Julius Caesar detailing his campaigns against his Republican enemies in the province of Africa. It continues his accounts of his campaigns in De Bello Gallico and De Bello Civili, and is continued by a sequel by an unknown author, De Bello Alexandrino.

== Authorship ==
De Bello Africo is preceded by De Bello Alexandrino and followed by De Bello Hispaniensi. These three works end the Caesarean corpus relating Caesar's Civil War. The historical narratives, though attributed to Caesar, are assumed to have been written by three different anonymous authors around 40 BC. Though normally collected and bound with Caesar's authentic writings, their authorship has been debated since antiquity. One very plausible theory favors Aulus Hirtius as the author of De Bello Alexandrino (see there for details). But due to considerable differences in style, scholarly consensus has agreed that neither Aulus Hirtius nor Julius Caesar can be the author or authors of the two last parts. It has been suggested that these were in fact rough drafts prepared at the request of Hirtius by two separate soldiers who fought in the respective campaign; and had he survived, Hirtius would have worked them up into more effective literary form. There are scholars who propose that he acted as editor to these historical narratives. Regarding De Bello Africo, A.G. Way ventures: "The careful chronology and the faithful record of the feelings of the troops suggests a soldier – possibly a junior officer – who was on the spot. That he was young and inexperienced; an ardent, but not always a balanced, partisan; a keen observer of all that went on around him, but without access to the inner counsels of his C.-in-C."

== See also ==
- Commentarii de Bello Gallico
- Commentarii de Bello Civili
- De Bello Alexandrino
- De Bello Hispaniensi
- Caesar's civil wars for an account of the campaign
