= Siege of Utica =

204–201 BC siege of the Second Punic War

- Part of the Second Punic War
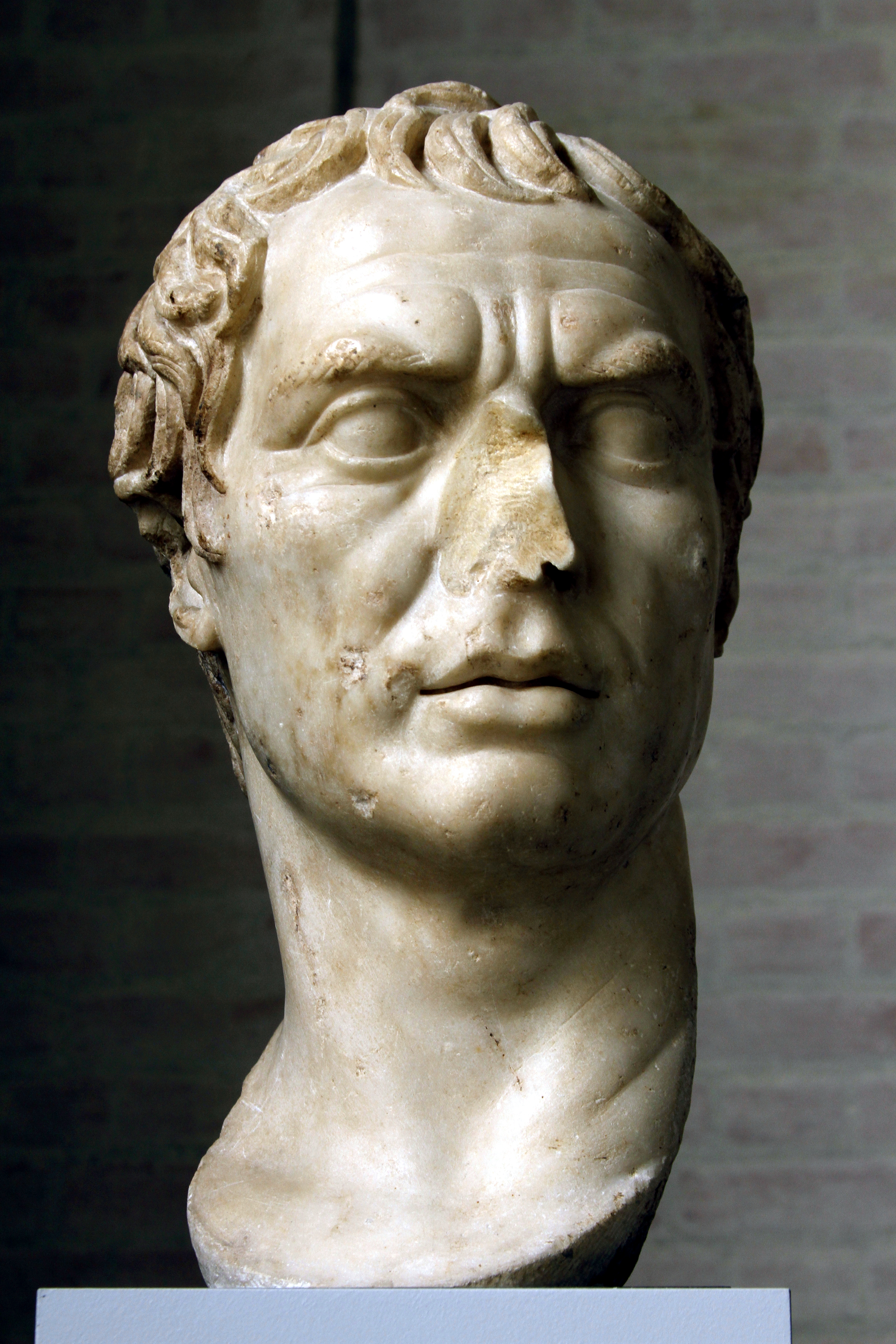
- A marble bust of the Roman commander, Scipio
Date	204–201 BC
Location	Utica, Tunisia 37.0565°N 10.0623°E
Result	Carthaginian victory

Belligerents
Carthage	Rome

Commanders and leaders
Hasdrubal Gisco; Syphax; Hannibal	Scipio Africanus

The Siege of Utica took place between 204 and 201 BC, when a Roman army under the general Publius Cornelius Scipio attempted to seize the port of Utica, intending to use it as a secure base from which to defeat the Carthaginian Empire in its North African homeland during the Second Punic War. Following 13 years of conflict, Scipio, who had recently expelled the Carthaginians from Iberia (modern-day Spain and Portugal), was assigned to Sicily in 205 BC, from where he was to launch an invasion of Carthaginian territory.

Upon his landing in North Africa the following year, Scipio's army conducted extensive raids across the surrounding countryside before laying siege to Utica, a major port city in what is now northeastern Tunisia. Scipio aimed to secure a harbour capable of providing shelter from the unfavourable weather conditions expected during the winter. He anticipated that the city would surrender readily; however, despite fierce attacks by Roman forces from both land and sea, it continued to resist. Its garrison and inhabitants expected the arrival of relief forces from Carthage.

The situation changed with the arrival of a substantial Carthaginian army, supported by an even larger contingent of allied Numidian troops. The combined force established a camp approximately 11 kilometres (7 mi) south of Utica. Faced with this opposing force, the Romans abandoned the siege and withdrew to their own fortified camp for the winter. In the spring of 203 BC, Scipio feigned preparations to resume the siege before launching a series of night attacks against the opposing camps, inflicting devastating losses.

The Carthaginian army reassembled approximately 120 kilometres (75 mi) from Utica. The Roman forces set out to meet them, leaving the continuation of the siege largely in the hands of the navy. At the Battle of the Great Plains, the Carthaginians suffered a decisive defeat, and the Roman army marched on Tunis. From there, Roman scouts spotted a fleet dispatched from Carthage attempting to relieve Utica. Upon reaching the city, the Carthaginians discovered that the Roman fleet had adopted a new formation that they were unable to counter, and withdrew after a day of fighting. Hannibal was subsequently recalled from Italy, while Scipio set out to confront him, once again entrusting the continuation of the siege to the navy. The resulting Battle of Zama ended in the annihilation of Hannibal's army, compelling the Carthaginians to sue for peace. The subsequent peace treaty, signed in 201 BC, imposed harsh terms on Carthage. Nevertheless, as Roman forces withdrew from North Africa, Utica remained a Carthaginian city.

== Background ==
=== First Punic War ===
The First Punic War was fought between the two main powers of the western Mediterranean in the 3rd century BC: Carthage and Rome. The war lasted for 23 years, from 264 to 241 BC, and was fought primarily on the island of Sicily, and in its surrounding waters and North Africa. The Carthaginians were defeated and by the terms of the Treaty of Lutatius evacuated Sicily and paid Rome an indemnity of 3,200 silver talents (Note: Several different "talents" are known from antiquity. The ones referred to in this article are all Euboic (or Euboeic) talents, of approximately 26 kilograms (57 lb). 3,200 talents was approximately 82,000 kg (81 long tons) of silver.) over ten years. Four years later, Rome seized Sardinia and Corsica on a cynical pretence and imposed a further 1,200 talent indemnity, (Note: 1,200 talents was approximately 30,000 kg (30 long tons) of silver.) actions which fuelled Carthaginian resentment.

=== Second Punic War ===
The approximate extent of territory controlled by Rome and Carthage immediately before the start of the Second Punic War

In early 218 BC, after a period of deteriorating relations, Rome declared war on Carthage, starting the Second Punic War. Hannibal, the de facto ruler of Carthaginian Iberia, led a large Carthaginian army through Gaul and over the Alps, and invaded mainland Italy in late 218 BC. During the next three years Hannibal inflicted heavy defeats on the Romans at the battles of the Trebia, Lake Trasimene and Cannae. At the last of these alone, at least 67,500 Romans were killed or captured. These great military calamities brought Rome to the brink of collapse. Hannibal's army campaigned in Italy for the following 14 years.

In 210 BC Publius Cornelius Scipio (Note: Publius Scipio was the son of the previous Roman co-commander in Iberia, also named Publius Scipio, and the nephew of the other co-commander, Gnaeus Scipio. Both his father and uncle had died at the Battle of the Upper Baetis in 211 BC.) took command of Roman forces in Iberia (modern Spain and Portugal) and in a carefully planned assault in 209 BC captured the centre of Carthaginian power in Iberia, New Carthage. During the following four years Scipio repeatedly defeated the Carthaginians and drove them out of Iberia in 205 BC.

== Prelude ==
In early 205 BC Scipio left Iberia, returned to Rome and was elected to the senior position of consul. He had anticipated an invasion of North Africa while still in Spain and so had opened negotiations with the Numidian leaders whose North African lands lay to the west of Carthaginian territory, Masinissa and Syphax. He failed to win over the latter, but made an ally of the former.

There was intense debate in the Roman Senate over Scipio's plan, in particular whether it was wise to attempt an invasion of North Africa when Hannibal was still campaigning in Italy with a Carthaginian army – and, if so, whether Scipio was the best person to lead it. There was a political compromise by which Scipio gained most of what he had hoped for. It was decided that he be given Sicily as his consular province; Sicily was the best location from which to launch an invasion of the Carthaginian homeland and then logistically support it. However, commitment to the enterprise was less than wholehearted: Scipio was given command of the two legions already based in Sicily and permission to cross to Africa on his own judgement, but was only allowed to call for volunteers to build up his consular army – not conscript troops, as was usual.

The total number of men available to Scipio and how many of them travelled to Africa is unclear; the ancient historian Livy gives totals for the invasion force of either 12,200, 17,600 or 35,000. Modern historians estimate a combat strength of 25,000–30,000, of whom more than 90% were infantry. With up to half of the complement of his legions being fresh volunteers, and with no fighting having taken place in Sicily for the past five years, Scipio instigated a rigorous training regime. This lasted for approximately a year. At the same time a vast quantity of food and materiel was gathered, and large numbers of merchant ships to transport it and his troops, and warships to escort the transports were assembled.

== Siege ==
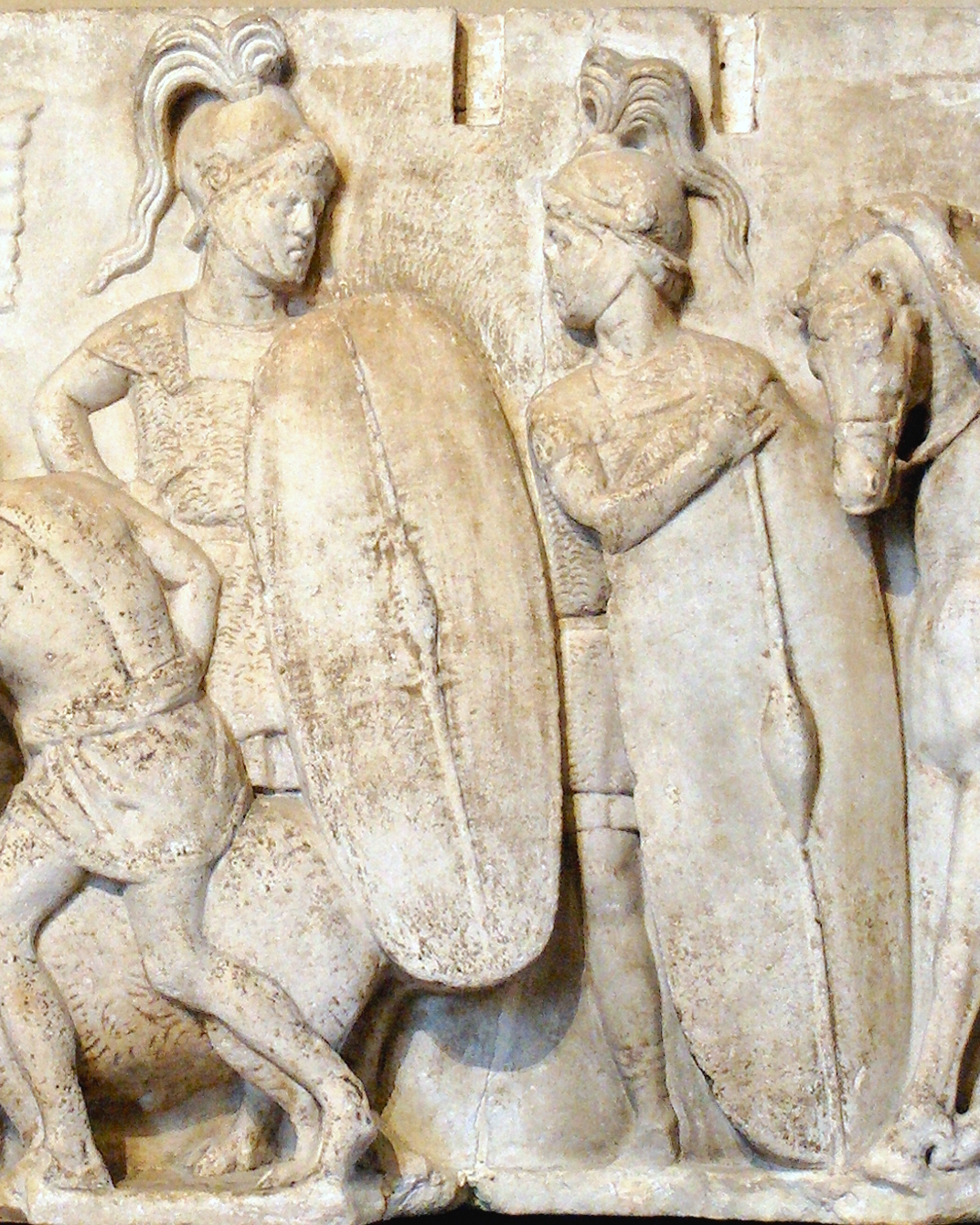
Detail from the Ahenobarbus relief showing two Roman foot-soldiers from the second century BC

In 204 BC, probably June or July, the Roman army left Sicily in 400 transport ships, escorted by 40 galleys. Three days later they disembarked at Cape Farina 20 kilometres (12 mi) north of the large Carthaginian port of Utica. The locals fled and the area was pillaged; 8,000 captives were sent back to Sicily as slaves. Carthage's immediate response, a scouting party of 500 cavalry, was defeated with the loss of its commander and the general in overall charge of responding to the invasion. Masinissa joined the Romans with either 200 or 2,000 men – the sources differ.

Wanting a more permanent base, and a port which would be resilient to the bad weather to be expected when winter came, Scipio besieged Utica. At the time Utica was a major port, although it is now 8 kilometres (5 mi) inland because of the silting up of the River Bagradas. (Note: Now known as the Medjerda River.) The Romans were well supplied with siege engines as they had shipped many from Sicily and also fabricated more on the spot. Scipio expected the city to surrender readily, but despite being attacked fiercely from land and sea it held out. The garrison and citizens of Utica assumed they would be relieved from Carthage, although the Carthaginian navy made no attempt to challenge the Roman control of the sea. Meanwhile, the Romans pillaged an ever-wider area, sending more loot and prisoners to Sicily in the ships bringing their supplies.

The siege continued until a Carthaginian army of 33,000 men under Hasdrubal Gisco set up a fortified camp 11 kilometres (7 mi) south of Utica. Syphax joined him, establishing his own camp 2 kilometres (1 mi) away with a reported 60,000 troops. The sizes of both of these armies as reported by ancient historians have been questioned by their modern counterparts as being infeasibly large. Nevertheless, it is accepted that the Romans were considerably outnumbered, in particular in terms of cavalry. The arrival of these armies caused the Romans to break off their close investment of Utica after forty days. They pulled back to a fortified camp on a rocky peninsula near Ghar el-Melh which was known as Castra Cornelia, about 3 kilometres (2 mi) east of the city. The three armies stayed in their camps throughout the winter, although emissaries were exchanged and negotiations to either end the war or to facilitate a Roman withdrawal from Africa took place.

In early spring the Romans started conspicuously reassembling and testing their siege equipment, mounting some engines on ships. A force of 2,000 men returned to a hill overlooking Utica and started repairing the siegeworks constructed the previous autumn. Scipio assembled his troops and made an announcement that he would shortly attempt to storm the defences of Utica. Scipio had the Roman navy carry out a demonstration off Utica, while he briefed his senior officers that in fact they were going to launch night attacks on the enemy camps. The repeated visits to the Carthaginian and Numidian camps for negotiations during the winter had been used to observe their layout and approaches.

=== Battle of Utica ===
On the night of the attack, two columns set out: one was commanded by Gaius Laelius, a legate and the Roman army's second in command, who had years of experience of operating under Scipio. This force consisted of about half the Romans and was accompanied by Masinissa's Numidians. Its target was Syphax's camp. Scipio led the balance of the Roman force against the Carthaginian camp.

Thanks to careful prior reconnoitring, both forces reached the positions from which they were to start their attacks without problems. Masinissa's cavalry positioned themselves in small groups so as to cover every route out of the camp of Syphax's Numidians. Laelius's column attacked first, storming Syphax's camp and concentrating on setting fire to as many of the reed huts housing their opponents as possible. The camp dissolved into chaos, with many of its Numidian occupants oblivious of the Roman attack and thinking the barracks had caught fire accidentally. The Carthaginians heard the commotion and saw the blaze; some of them set off to help extinguish the fire, also thinking it was accidental. Scipio's contingent then attacked; they cut down the Carthaginians heading for their ally's camp, stormed Hasdrubal's camp and set fire to its wooden huts used for housing. The fire spread between the close-spaced barracks. Carthaginians rushed out into the dark and confusion, without armour or weapons, either trying to escape the flames or to fight the fire. The organised and prepared Romans were at a great advantage and Carthaginian casualties were high. Hasdrubal escaped from his burning camp with only 2,500 men. Losses among Syphax's Numidians are not recorded.

=== Battle of the Great Plains ===
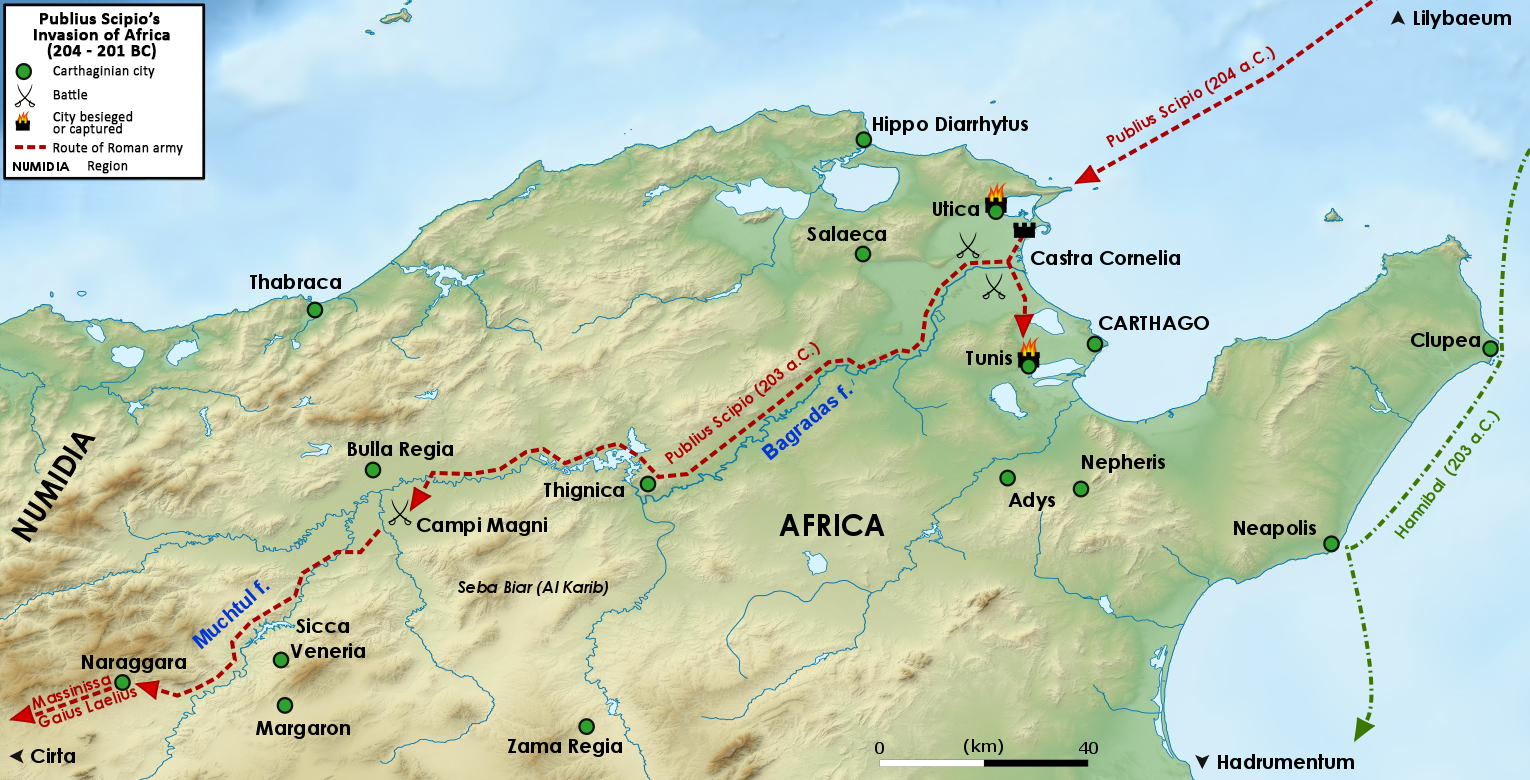
Part of North Africa with Scipio's campaign shown

When word of the defeat reached Carthage, there was panic – with calls to renew the peace negotiations, or to recall Hannibal and his army. A decision was reached to fight on, with just what locally available forces could be assembled. Syphax remained loyal and joined Hasdrubal with what was left of his army. Hasdrubal raised further local troops with whom to reinforce the survivors of Utica. The combined force, estimated to have been 30,000 strong, established a fortified camp on an area of flat ground by the Bagradas River known as the Great Plains. This was near modern Souk el Kremis and about 120 kilometres (75 mi) from Utica.

Hearing of this, Scipio marched most of his army to the scene, leaving a small force and the navy to continue the siege of Utica. The size of his army is not known, but it was outnumbered by the Carthaginians. After several days of skirmishing, both armies committed to a pitched battle. Upon being charged by the Romans, all of those Carthaginians who had been involved in the debacle at Utica turned and fled; morale had not recovered. Only the new recruits stood and fought; they were enveloped by the well-drilled Roman legions and wiped out. Hasdrubal fled to Carthage, where he was demoted and exiled. A large Roman detachment pursued Syphax west. His army was defeated again at the Battle of Cirta and Syphax was captured. The main Roman army moved slowly east, devastating the countryside and capturing and sacking many towns. They then based themselves in Tunis, which had been abandoned by its Carthaginian garrison; Tunis was only 24 kilometres (15 mi) from the city of Carthage. This cut Carthage off from its hinterland.

=== Naval battle ===
Over the winter the Carthaginians had increased the number of equipped and crewed war galleys they had, and they now felt ready to challenge the Romans at sea. The Carthaginians were aware that many of the Roman ships had been adapted to carry out siege operations, rather than to fight ship to ship. At some point while the Roman army was in Tunis, the Carthaginian fleet left port and sailed for Utica, intending to lift the siege and hoping to wipe out the Roman fleet while doing so. Roman scouts observed the Carthaginian galleys departing and sailing north, and Scipio realised the threat they posed to his fleet. He sent messengers to alert the Roman ships, or by some accounts rode to Utica himself to raise the alarm. The Roman legions followed in a rapid march.

Although Utica is only 56 kilometres (35 mi) north of Carthage, the Carthaginian ships did not arrive until the next morning. Possibly they paused to allow the crews of each ship some practice at working as a unit and the ships similarly as squadrons. By the time they arrived, the Romans had expediently lashed the whole of their fleet into one unit, with several ranks of transports in front of the specialist war galleys. On the foremost row of transports were 1,000 soldiers with a large supply of javelins. Each rank of transport ships had a passageway installed running its length, making it easy for these marines to move from one point of danger to another.

The Carthaginian fleet attacked shortly after sunrise, but the improvised Roman formation frustrated the Carthaginians, who had imagined their galleys would have to fight their way past their Roman counterparts in the open sea, at which point the Roman transports would scatter. Instead they faced a tight-locked wall of transports, whose higher freeboard meant the Carthaginians had to improvise grappling hooks or ladders to board them. Meanwhile the Roman marines could hurl javelins down onto the open decks of the Carthaginian galleys from relatively protected positions. By the end of the day the Carthaginians had managed to capture, cut loose, and tow away 60 Roman transports. This may have been the whole of the front rank of Roman transport ships, but the Carthaginians had had enough of the fight. They made their way back to Carthage with their captives, leaving the majority of the transports and all of the Roman war galleys unscathed.

=== Peace ===
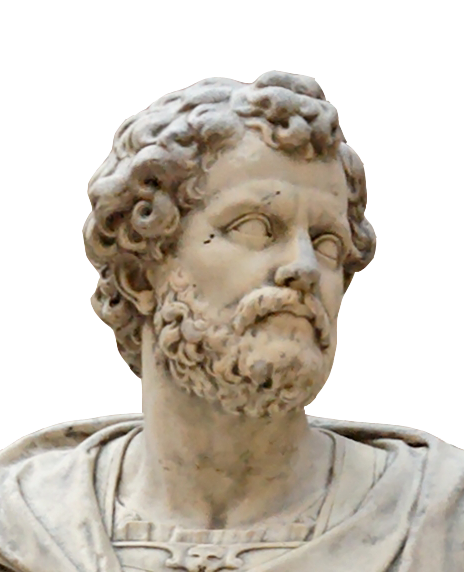
Hannibal

Scipio and the Carthaginian Senate entered into peace negotiations, while Carthage recalled Hannibal from Italy. The Roman Senate ratified a draft treaty, but because of mistrust of the Romans and a surge in confidence when Hannibal arrived from Italy, Carthage repudiated it. Hannibal was placed in command of another army, formed of veterans from Italy and newly raised troops from Africa, with 80 war elephants but few cavalry. The decisive Battle of Zama followed in October 202 BC. After a prolonged fight the Carthaginian army collapsed; Hannibal was one of the few to escape the field.

The Romans marched back to Castra Cornelia, where they were again resupplied from Sicily, and then again to Tunis. The Carthaginians again sued for peace. Given the difficulty of ending the war by storming or starving the city of Carthage, and his fear that he might be superseded in command, Scipio entered into negotiations. The peace treaty the Romans subsequently imposed on the Carthaginians stripped them of their overseas territories and some of their African ones. An indemnity of 10,000 silver talents (Note: 10,000 talents was approximately 269,000 kilograms (265 long tons) of silver.) was to be paid over 50 years, hostages were taken, Carthage was forbidden to possess war elephants and its fleet was restricted to 10 warships. It was prohibited from waging war outside Africa and in Africa only with Rome's express permission. Some senior Carthaginians wanted to reject it, but Hannibal was aware of Carthage's desperate exhaustion of resources and the forlorn nature of continued resistance; after he spoke strongly in its favour it was accepted in spring 201 BC. Henceforth it was clear Carthage was politically subordinate to Rome. The siege of Utica had been lifted at some point prior to this after over two years of siege or blockade; it remained a Carthaginian city.

== Aftermath ==
Scipio was awarded a triumph and received the agnomen "Africanus". Hannibal became the suffete (chief magistrate) of Carthage and helped rebuild its economic prosperity. In 195 BC he was driven into exile by the Romans. Masinissa exploited the prohibition on Carthage waging war to repeatedly raid and seize Carthaginian territory with impunity. Carthage appealed to Rome, which always backed its Numidian ally. In 149 BC Carthage sent an army against Masinissa, the treaty notwithstanding. This sparked the Third Punic War later that year. Utica immediately went over to Rome and was used as a base for a Roman invasion of North Africa and as a siege of Carthage. In the spring of 146 BC the Romans captured the city of Carthage and systematically destroyed it, killing or enslaving its inhabitants. The formerly Carthaginian territories were annexed by Rome and reconstituted to become the Roman province of Africa with Utica as its capital.
