= Roman invasion =

Roman invasion may refer to:

- Roman invasion of Sicily
- Roman invasion of Malta
- Roman invasion of Greece
- Roman invasion of Africa (204–201 BC)
- Roman invasion of Gaul
- Roman invasion of Arabia
- Roman invasion of Parthia
- Roman invasion of Britain
  - Roman invasion of Caledonia
    - Roman invasion of Caledonia (208–211)
- Roman invasion of Persarmenia (543)
