= Battle of Utica (203 BC) =

Battle of the Second Punic War in 203 BC

- Part of the Second Punic War
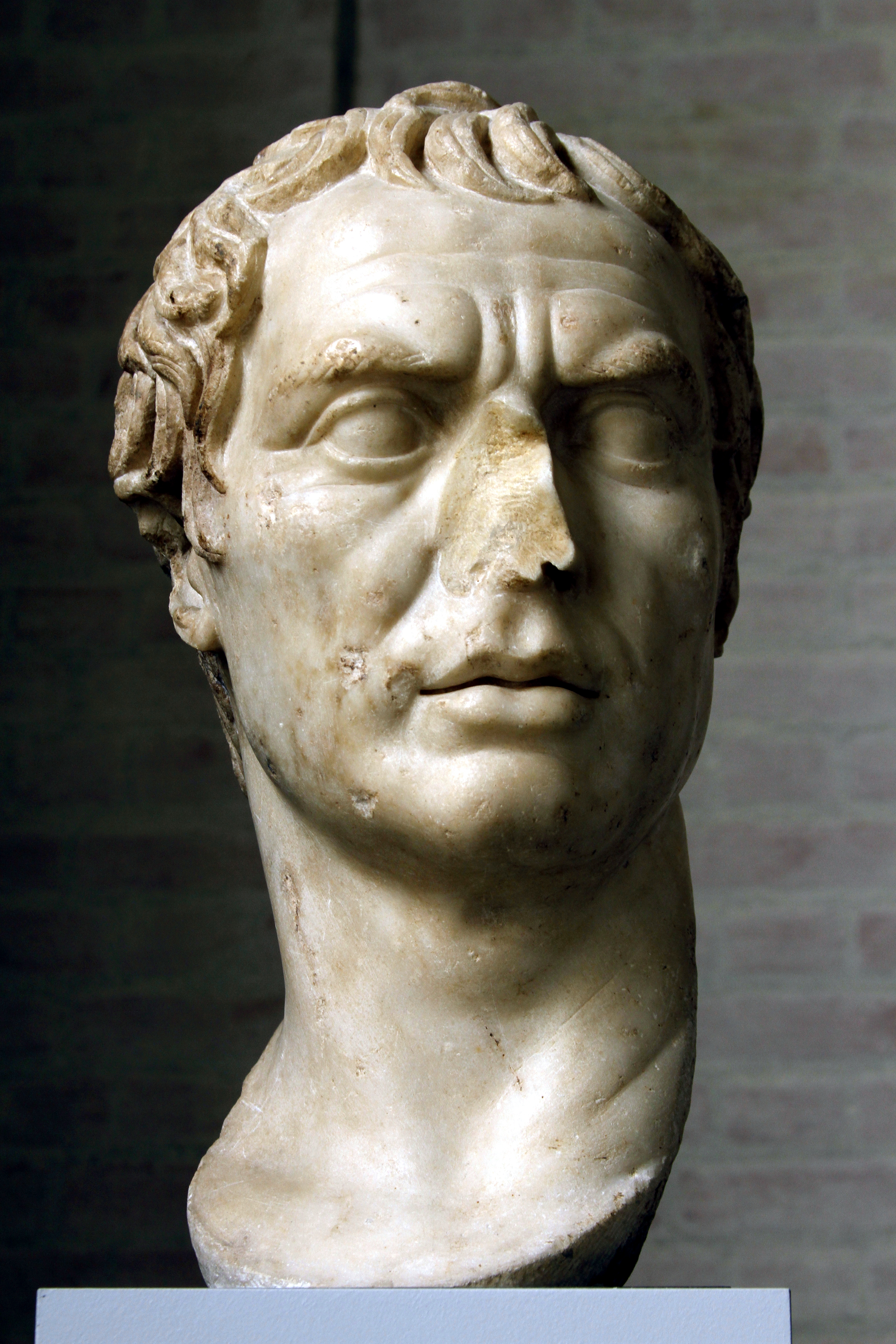
- A marble bust of the Roman commander, Scipio
Date	Spring 203 BC
Location	Near Utica, modern Tunisia 37.0565°N 10.0623°E
Result	Roman victory

Belligerents
Rome	Carthage

Commanders and leaders
Publius Cornelius Scipio; Gaius Laelius; Masinissa	Hasdrubal Gisgo; Syphax

The battle of Utica was fought in 203 BC between a Roman army commanded by Publius Cornelius Scipio and the allied armies of Carthage and Numidia, commanded by Hasdrubal Gisgo and Syphax respectively. The battle was part of the Second Punic War and resulted in a heavy defeat for Carthage.

In the wake of its defeat in the First Punic War (264–241 BC) Carthage expanded its territory in south-east Iberia (modern Spain and Portugal). When the Second Punic War broke out in 218 BC a Roman army landed in north-east Iberia. After a disastrous Roman setback in 210 BC Scipio took command and cleared the peninsula of Carthaginians in five years. He returned to Rome determined to carry the war to the Carthaginian homeland in North Africa. Appointed consul in 205 BC Scipio spent a year in Sicily training his army and accumulating supplies. In 204 BC the Romans landed near the Carthaginian port of Utica with four legions. The Romans defeated two large Carthaginian scouting parties, besieged Utica and set up a fortified camp.

The Carthaginians and their Numidian allies each set up their own camps about 11 kilometres (7 mi) from the Romans but close to each other. The Romans were outnumbered and so avoided battle; the Carthaginians were wary of Scipio's skill as a field commander and content to wait for reinforcements. During this pause, Syphax offered to act as an intermediary to broker a peace, and the three parties entered into a long series of negotiations. With his delegations Scipio sent junior officers disguised as slaves to report back on the layout and construction of the Numidian camp, as well as the size and composition of the Numidian army. As the weather improved Scipio made conspicuous preparations to assault Utica. Instead, he marched his army out late one evening and divided it in two. One part launched a night attack on the Numidian camp, setting fire to their barracks which were made from reeds. In the ensuing panic and confusion the Numidians were dispersed with heavy casualties. Not realising what was happening, many Carthaginians set off in the dark to help extinguish what they assumed was an accidental blaze in their allies' camp. Scipio attacked them with the remaining Romans, stormed their camp and set fire to many of the Carthaginians' wooden huts. Again the Romans inflicted heavy casualties in the dark.

Hasdrubal fled 40 kilometres (25 mi) to Carthage with 2,500 survivors, pursued by Scipio. Syphax escaped with a few cavalry and regrouped 11 kilometres (7 mi) away. Over the following year the Carthaginians raised two more armies and each was defeated by Scipio, at the Great Plains and Zama. Carthage sued for peace and accepted a humiliating treaty, ending the war.

== Background ==
=== First Punic War ===
The First Punic War was fought between the two main powers of the western Mediterranean in the 3rd century BC: Carthage and Rome. The war lasted for 23 years, from 264 to 241 BC, and was fought primarily on the Mediterranean island of Sicily, its surrounding waters and in North Africa. The Carthaginians were defeated and by the terms of the Treaty of Lutatius evacuated Sicily and paid Rome an indemnity of 3,200 silver talents (Note: Several different "talents" are known from antiquity. The ones referred to in this article are all Euboic (or Euboeic) talents, of approximately 26 kilograms (57 lb). 3,200 talents was approximately 82,000 kg (81 long tons) of silver.) over ten years. Four years later, Rome seized Sardinia and Corsica on a cynical pretence and imposed a further 1,200 talent indemnity, (Note: 1,200 talents was approximately 30,000 kg (30 long tons) of silver.) actions which fuelled Carthaginian resentment. The near-contemporary historian Polybius considered this act of bad faith by the Romans to be the single greatest cause of war with Carthage breaking out again nineteen years later.

From 236 BC Carthage expanded its territory in Iberia, modern Spain and Portugal. In 226 BC the Ebro Treaty with Rome established the Ebro River as the northern boundary of the Carthaginian sphere of influence. A little later Rome made a separate treaty of association with the city of Saguntum, well south of the Ebro. In 219 BC Hannibal, the de facto ruler of Carthaginian Iberia, led an army to Saguntum and besieged, captured and sacked it. In early 218 BC Rome declared war on Carthage, starting the Second Punic War.

=== Second Punic War ===
The approximate extent of territory controlled by Rome and Carthage immediately before the start of the Second Punic War; Roman territory is pink, Carthaginian is purple

Hannibal led a large Carthaginian army from Iberia, through Gaul, over the Alps and invaded mainland Italy in 218 BC. During the next three years Hannibal inflicted heavy defeats on the Romans at the battles of the Trebia, Lake Trasimene and Cannae. At the last of these alone, at least 67,500 Romans were killed or captured. The historian Toni Ñaco del Hoyo describes these as "great military calamities", and Brian Carey writes that they brought Rome to the brink of collapse. Hannibal's army campaigned in Italy for 14 years before the survivors withdrew.

There was also extensive fighting in Iberia, Sicily, Sardinia and North Africa. In 211 BC the Romans suffered a severe reverse at the battle of the Upper Baetis and were penned back by the Carthaginians to the north-east corner of Iberia. In 210 BC Roman reinforcements stabilised the situation; later that year Publius Cornelius Scipio, (Note: Publius Scipio was the bereaved son of the previous Roman co-commander in Iberia, also named Publius Scipio, and the nephew of the other co-commander, Gnaeus Scipio.) arrived with further Roman reinforcements to take command in Iberia. In a carefully planned assault in 209 BC he captured the centre of Carthaginian power in Iberia, New Carthage. During the following four years Scipio repeatedly defeated the Carthaginians and drove them out of Iberia in 206 BC.

=== Opposing forces ===
==== Roman ====
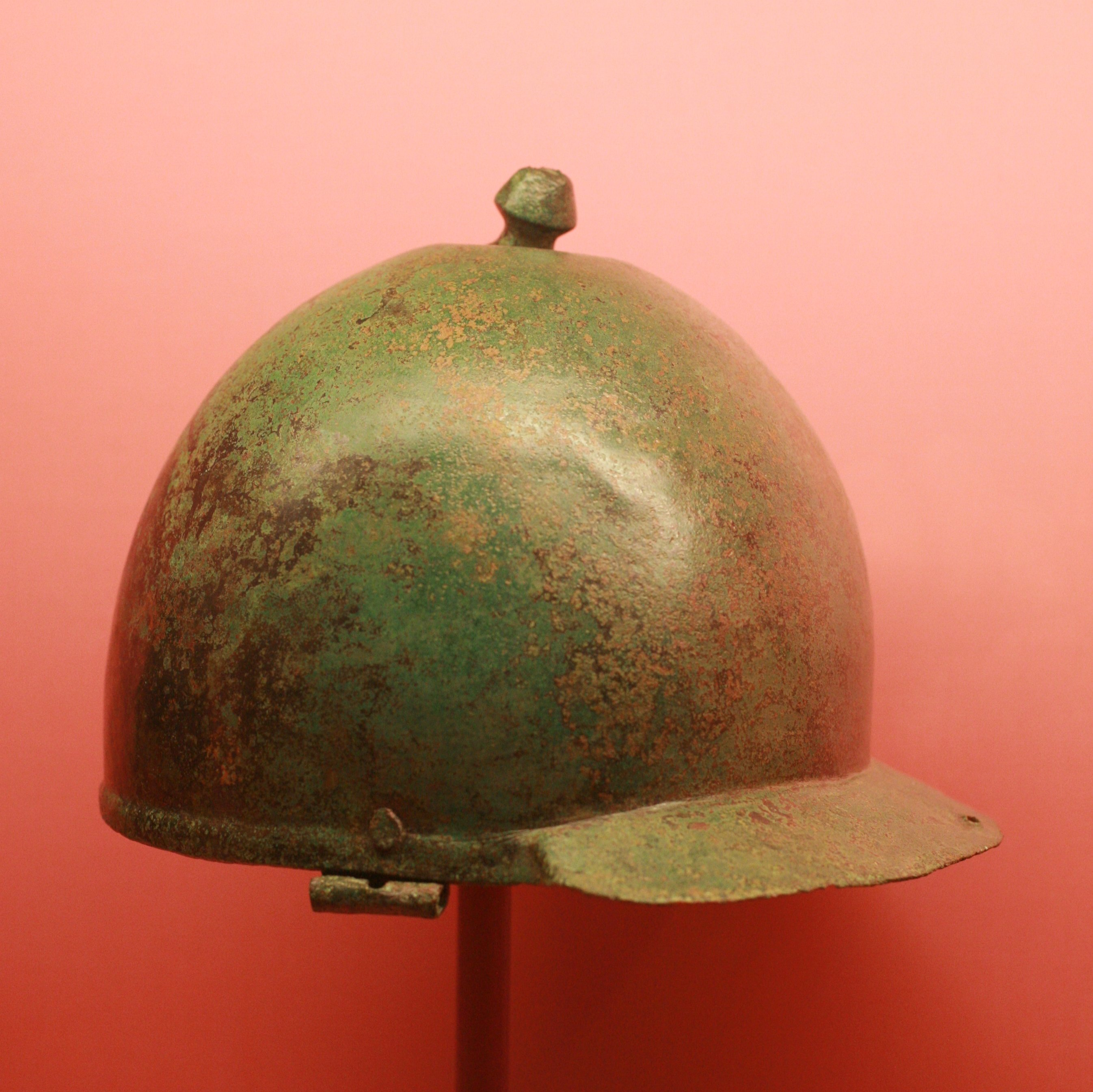
The bowl of a Montefortino-type helmet, which was used by Roman infantry between c. 300 BC and 100 AD. The cheek guards are missing.

Most male Roman citizens were liable for military service and would serve as infantry, with a better-off minority providing a cavalry component. Traditionally, when at war the Romans would raise two legions, each of 4,200 infantry – this could be increased to 5,000 in some circumstances, or, rarely, even more – and 300 cavalry. Approximately 1,200 of the infantry – poorer or younger men unable to afford the armour and equipment of a standard legionary – served as javelin-armed skirmishers known as velites; they each carried several javelins, which would be thrown from a distance, a short sword and a 90-centimetre (3 ft) shield. The balance were equipped as heavy infantry, with body armour, a large shield and short thrusting swords. They were divided into three ranks, of which the front rank also carried two javelins; the second and third ranks had a thrusting spear instead. Both legionary sub-units and individual legionaries fought in relatively open order. It was the long-standing Roman procedure to elect two men each year as senior magistrates, known as consuls, who in time of war would each lead an army. An army was usually formed by combining a Roman legion with a similarly sized and equipped legion provided by their Latin allies; allied legions usually had a larger attached complement of cavalry than Roman ones. By this stage of the war, Roman armies were generally larger, typically consisting of four legions, two Roman and two provided by its allies, for a total of approximately 20,000 men. The Roman army which invaded Africa consisted of four legions, each of the Roman pair reinforced to an unprecedented 6,200 infantry and with a more usual 300 cavalry each. Modern historians estimate the army to have totalled 25,000–30,000 men, including perhaps 2,500 cavalry.

==== Carthaginian ====
Carthaginian citizens only served in their army if there was a direct threat to the city of Carthage. When they did they fought as well-armoured heavy infantry armed with long thrusting spears, although they were notoriously ill-trained and ill-disciplined. In most circumstances Carthage recruited foreigners to make up its army. (Note: Roman and Greek sources refer to these foreign fighters derogatively as "mercenaries", but the modern historian Adrian Goldsworthy describes this as "a gross oversimplification". They served under a variety of arrangements: some were the regular troops of allied cities or kingdoms seconded to Carthage as part of formal treaties; some were from allied states fighting under their own leaders; many were volunteers from areas under Carthaginian control who were not Carthaginian citizens. (Carthaginian citizenship was largely reserved for inhabitants of the city of Carthage.)) Many were from North Africa and these were frequently referred to as "Libyans". The region provided several types of fighters, including: close order infantry equipped with large shields, helmets, short swords and long thrusting spears; javelin-armed light infantry skirmishers; close order shock cavalry (Note: "Shock" troops are those trained and used to close rapidly with an opponent, with the intention of breaking them before, or immediately upon, contact.) (also known as "heavy cavalry") carrying spears; and light cavalry skirmishers who threw javelins from a distance and avoided close combat. (The latter were usually Numidians.) The close order African infantry and the citizen-militia both fought in a tightly packed formation known as a phalanx. On occasion some of the infantry would wear captured Roman armour. As well both Iberia and Gaul provided experienced but unarmoured infantry who would charge ferociously, but had a reputation for breaking off if combat was protracted. Slingers were frequently recruited from the Balearic Islands.

== Prelude ==
In 206 BC Scipio left Iberia and returned to Italy. He was denied the triumph he would normally have expected on the grounds that he had not occupied any of the magistracies of the cursus honorum, the sequential mixture of military and political administrative positions held by aspiring Roman politicians. He was elected to the senior position of consul in early 205, despite not meeting the age requirement. Scipio was already anticipating an invasion of North Africa and while still in Spain had been negotiating with the Numidian leaders Masinissa and Syphax. He failed to win over the latter, but made an ally of the former.

Opinion was divided in Roman political circles as to whether an invasion of North Africa was excessively risky. Hannibal was still on Italian soil; there was the possibility of further Carthaginian invasions, shortly to be realised when Mago Barca landed in Liguria; the practical difficulties of an amphibious invasion and its logistical follow up were considerable; and when the Romans had invaded North Africa in 256 BC during the First Punic War they had been driven out with heavy losses, which had re-energised the Carthaginians. Eventually a compromise was agreed: Scipio was given Sicily as his consular province, which was the best location for the Romans to launch an invasion of the Carthaginian homeland from and then logistically support it, and permission to cross to Africa on his own judgement. But Roman commitment was less than wholehearted, Scipio could not conscript troops for his consular army, as was usual, only call for volunteers.

In 216 the survivors of the Roman defeat at Cannae were formed into two legions and sent to Sicily. They still formed the main part of the garrison of Sicily, and Scipio used the many men who volunteered to increase the strength of each of these to an unprecedented 6,500. The total number of men available to Scipio and how many of them travelled to Africa is unclear; the Roman historian Livy, writing 200 years later, gives totals for the invasion force of either 12,200, 17,600 or 35,000. Modern historians estimate a combat strength of 25,000–30,000, of whom more than 90% were infantry. With up to half of the complement of his legions being fresh volunteers, and with no fighting having taken place on Sicily for the past five years, Scipio instigated a rigorous training regime. This extended from drills by individual centuries – the basic Roman army manoeuvre unit of 80 men – to exercises by the full army. This lasted for approximately a year. At the same time Scipio assembled a vast quantity of food and materiel, merchant ships to transport it and his troops, and warships to escort the transports.

Also during 205 BC, 30 Roman ships under Scipio's second-in-command, the legate Gaius Laelius, raided North Africa around Hippo Regius, gathering large quantities of loot and many captives. The Carthaginians initially believed this was the anticipated invasion by Scipio and his full invasion force; they hastily strengthened fortifications and raised troops – including some units made up of Carthaginian citizens. Reinforcements were sent to Mago in Liguria in an attempt to distract the Romans in Italy. Meanwhile a succession war had broken out in Numidia between the Roman-supporting Masinissa and the Carthaginian-inclined Syphax. Laelius re-established contact with Masinissa during his raid. Masinissa expressed dismay regarding how long it was taking the Romans to complete their preparations and land in Africa.

== Invasion ==
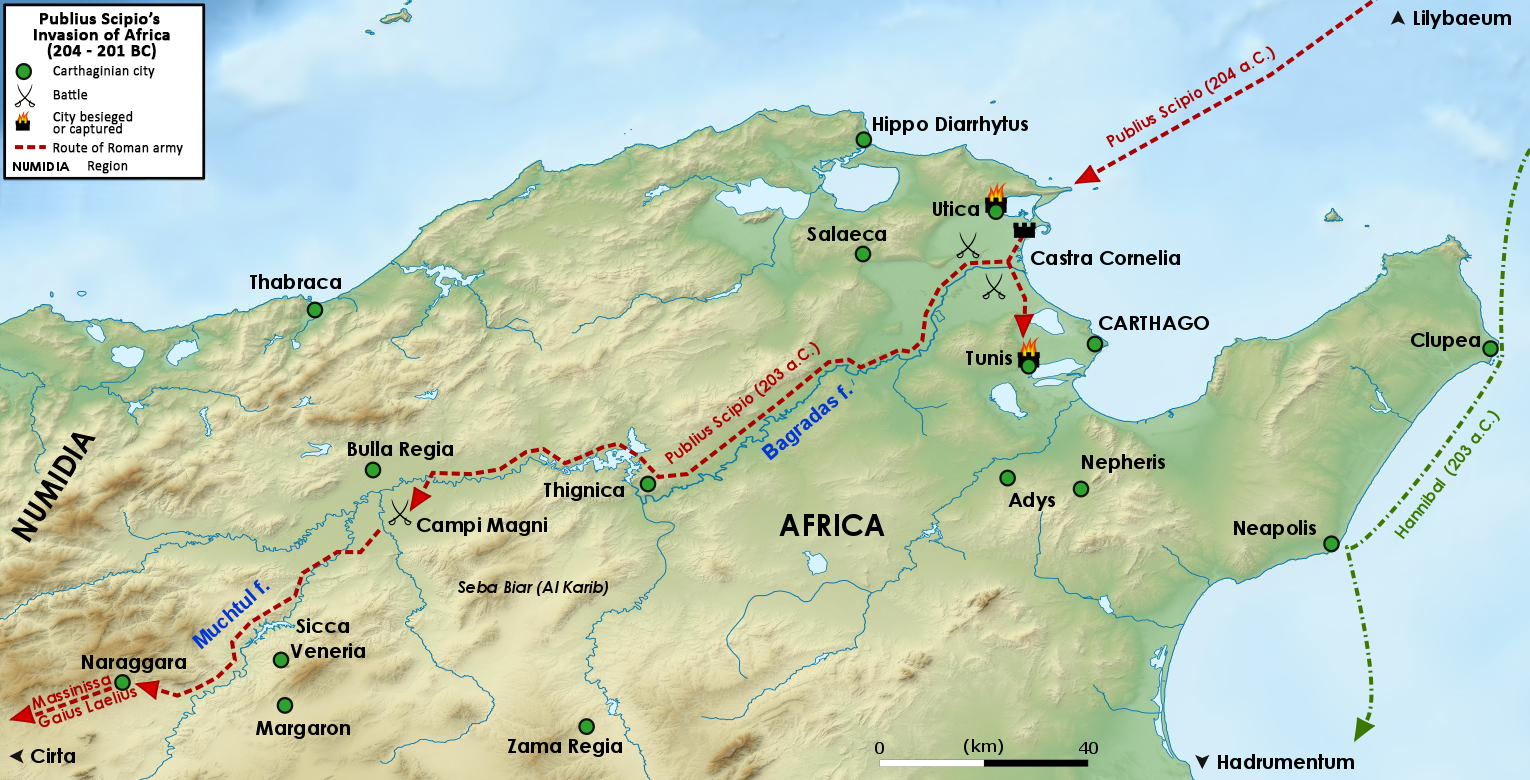
Part of North Africa with Scipio's campaign shown

In 204 BC, probably in June or July, the Roman army left Sicily in 400 transport ships, escorted by 40 galleys. Three days later they disembarked at Cape Farina 20 kilometres (12 mi) north of the large Carthaginian port of Utica. The locals fled and Carthage's immediate response, a scouting party of 500 cavalry, was defeated with the loss of its commander and the general in overall charge of responding to the invasion. The area was pillaged and 8,000 captives were sent back to Sicily as slaves or hostages. Masinissa joined the Romans with either 200 or 2,000 men; the sources differ. A large fortified camp was established on a rocky peninsula near Ghar el-Melh which was known as Castra Cornelia. Masinissa had been recently defeated by his Numidian rival Syphax, wounded and had his army scattered. Syphax had been persuaded to take firm action in support of Carthage by the Carthaginian general Hasdrubal Gisco and by his assertive new wife: Hasdrubal's daughter Sophonisba.

Carthage sent a larger party to probe the Roman position, about 4,000 soldiers under a general called Hanno. His command of mixed Numidians and Carthaginian citizens based itself at Salaeca, 24 kilometres (15 mi) from the Romans, and did little scouting. Following a stratagem agreed with Scipio, Masinissa's cavalry raided Hanno's force who chased them off and then pursued them into a Roman ambush. Hanno and 1,000 of his men were killed or taken prisoner. The survivors were in turn pursued for 50 kilometres (30 mi), only 1,000 escaped. The Romans pillaged an ever-wider area, sending their loot and prisoners to Sicily in the ships bringing their supplies.

=== Siege of Utica ===
Wanting a more permanent base and a port more resilient to the bad weather to be expected when winter came, Scipio besieged Utica. Despite the Romans being well supplied with siege engines the siege dragged on and a Carthaginian army under Hasdrubal set up a fortified camp 11 kilometres (7 mi) from the Romans with a reported 33,000 men. Syphax joined him, establishing his own camp 3 kilometres (2 mi) away from Hasdrubal's with a reported 60,000 troops. The size of both of these armies as reported by ancient historians have been questioned by their modern counterparts as being infeasibly large. Nevertheless, it is accepted that the Romans were considerably outnumbered, in particular in terms of cavalry. The modern historian Dexter Hoyos suggests a combined Numidian and Carthaginian total of 47,500 men. The Romans pulled back from Utica to Castra Cornelia, where they were themselves now blockaded on the landward side. Being outnumbered, Scipio was reluctant to commit his army to an open battle. Hasdrubal in turn was aware that two years earlier an army led by him in Iberia had been heavily defeated by a much smaller Roman army commanded by Scipio at the battle of Ilipa and so was himself reluctant to commit to a battle. He knew that more troops were being recruited in Iberia and was content to pause hostilities until they joined his army.

Scipio sent emissaries to Syphax to attempt to persuade him to defect. Syphax in turn offered to broker peace terms. A series of exchanges of negotiating parties followed, the sessions lasting several days. With his delegations Scipio sent junior officers disguised as slaves to report back on the layout and construction of the Numidian camp, as well as the size and composition of the Numidian army and the most frequented routes in and out of the camp. The Carthaginian camp was solidly constructed, with earthen ramparts and timber-built barracks; the Numidian one was less so, with no clearly defined perimeter and the accommodation for the soldiers being largely constructed of reeds and roofed with thatch.

== Battle ==
Scipio drew out the negotiations with Syphax, eventually stating he was in broad agreement with the proposition, but that his senior officers were not yet convinced. Scipio was acting in bad faith, as he had no intention of agreeing a peace treaty and the only purpose of the talks from his point of view was to gain militarily useful intelligence. By the diplomatic standards of the time, Scipio launching a surprise attack while in the midst of peace negotiations was ethically dubious. Ancient Roman historians go to great lengths to excuse or explain his behaviour.

In 203 BC, as the better weather of spring approached, Scipio made an announcement to his troops that he would shortly attempt to storm the defences of Utica and began obvious preparations to do so. Simultaneously he was planning a night attack on both enemy camps. Local knowledge and careful scouting identified the routes least likely to cause problems at night, and Scipio briefed his senior officers carefully. On the night of the attack, a strong guard was left at Castra Cornelia. At around nine or ten in the evening two columns set out: one was commanded by Laelius, who had years of experience of operating under Scipio. This force consisted of about half the Roman attackers and was accompanied by the Numidians. Its target was Syphax's camp. Scipio led the balance of the Roman force against the Carthaginian camp. The total number of troops involved in the attack is not known.

Thanks to the careful prior reconnoitring both forces reached the positions from which they were to start their attacks without problems, despite the inherent difficulty of night manoeuvres. Masinissa's Numidian cavalry positioned themselves in small groups so as to cover every route out of the two enemy camps. Laelius's column attacked first, storming the camp of Syphax's Numidians and concentrating on setting fire to as many of the reed huts as possible. The camp dissolved into chaos, many of its Numidian occupants oblivious of the Roman attack and thinking the barracks had caught fire accidentally; some were burned to death and others were trampled in the panic. Meanwhile, the well-briefed Romans were killing many who tried to escape and the Numidians fell upon those who got past the Romans.

The Carthaginians heard the commotion and saw the blaze; some of them set off to help extinguish the fire. With pre-planned coordination Scipio's contingent then attacked. They cut down the Carthaginians heading for their ally's camp, stormed Hasdrubal's camp and attempted to set fire to the wooden housing. They were successful in this and the fire spread between the closely spaced barracks. Carthaginians rushed out into the dark and confusion, without armour or weapons, either trying to escape the flames or to fight the fire. The organised and prepared Romans cut them down.

Polybius writes that Hasdrubal escaped from his burning camp with only 2,500 men. Syphax also escaped, with a few cavalry. Ancient sources claim that either 30,000 or 40,000 Carthaginians and Numidians were killed and either 2,400 or 5,000 captured; modern historians consider these to be greatly exaggerated. The following morning the Romans pursued, scattering the survivors, and capturing and sacking two Carthaginian towns before withdrawing. Hasdrubal fled as far as Carthage, 40 kilometres (25 mi) away; Syphax rallied at the town of Abba, 11 kilometres (7 mi) from the scene of the disaster.

== Aftermath ==
With no Carthaginian field army to threaten them, the Romans pressed their siege of Utica and pillaged an extensive area of North Africa with strong and far-ranging raids. As well as gold and slaves the Romans accumulated large amounts of foodstuffs. This was added to the extensive stocks already built up by shipping grain from Sicily. Hasdrubal and Syphax gathered the scattered survivors of their armies, levied new forces and were reinforced by 4,000 Iberian warriors. They assembled approximately 30,000 men 120 kilometres (75 mi) from Utica near the Bagradas River. Scipio marched most of his army to meet them, both sides accepted battle and the Carthaginians were heavily defeated. Syphax and his Numidians were pursued, brought to battle at Cirta, and again defeated, Syphax being captured. Scipio moved his main army to Tunis, within sight of the city of Carthage.

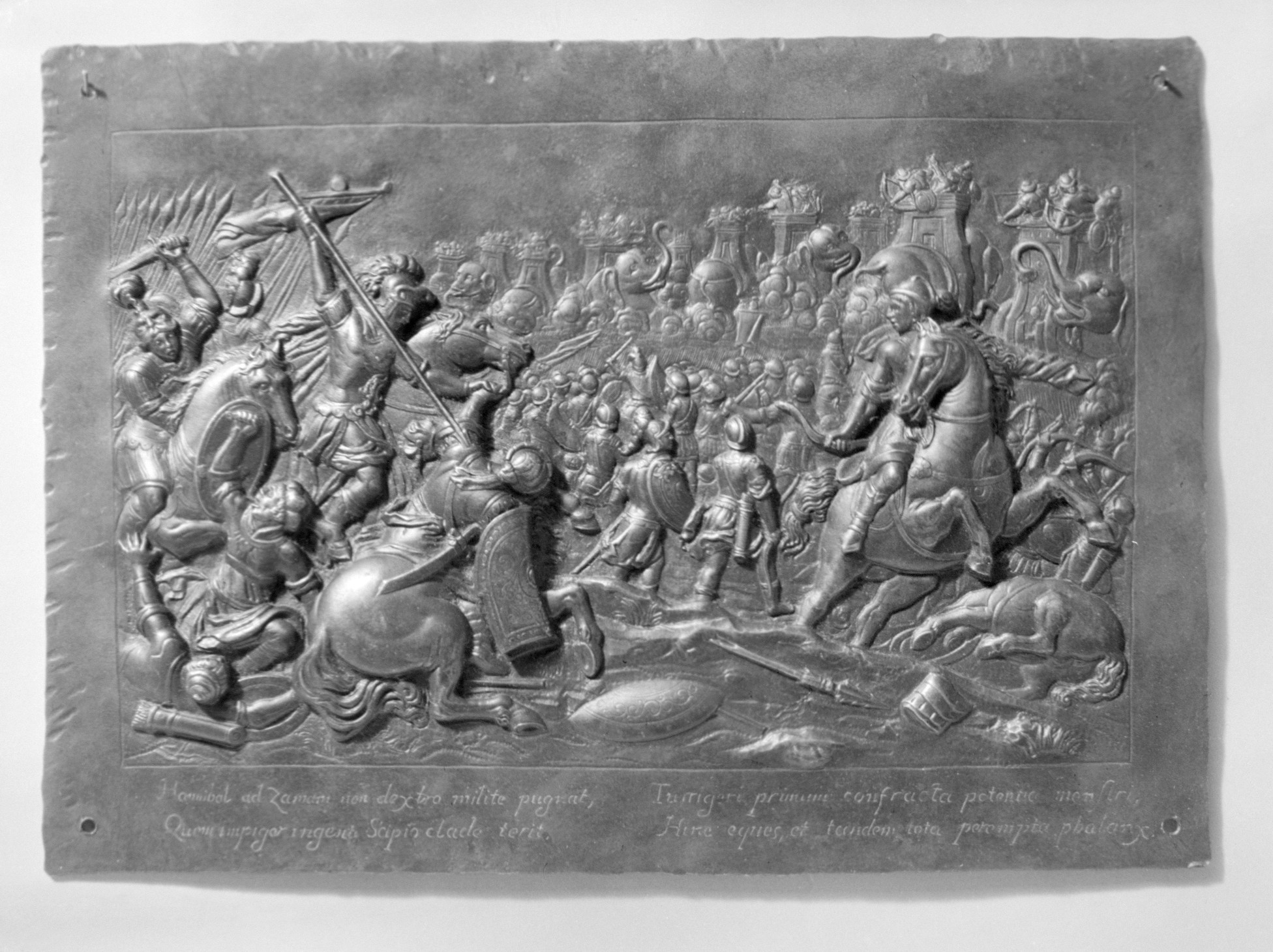
The battle of Zama, as envisaged in the 17th century

Scipio and Carthage entered into peace negotiations, while Carthage recalled both Hannibal and Mago from Italy. The Roman Senate ratified a draft treaty, but because of mistrust and a surge in confidence when Hannibal arrived from Italy, Carthage repudiated it. Hannibal was placed in command of another army, formed of his and Mago's veterans from Italy and newly raised troops from Africa, with 80 war elephants but few cavalry. The decisive battle of Zama followed in October 202 BC. After a prolonged fight the Carthaginian army collapsed; Hannibal was one of the few to escape the field.

The peace treaty the Romans subsequently imposed on the Carthaginians stripped them of all of their non-African territories and some of their African ones. An indemnity of 10,000 silver talents (Note: 10,000 talents was approximately 269,000 kilograms (265 long tons) of silver.) was to be paid over 50 years, hostages were taken. Carthage was forbidden to possess war elephants and its fleet was restricted to 10 warships. It was prohibited from waging war outside Africa, and in Africa only with Rome's express permission. Many senior Carthaginians wanted to reject it, but Hannibal spoke strongly in its favour and it was accepted in spring 201 BC. Henceforth it was clear Carthage was politically subordinate to Rome. Scipio was awarded a triumph and received the agnomen "Africanus".

== Notes, citations and sources ==
=== Sources ===
- Bagnall, Nigel (1999). The Punic Wars: Rome, Carthage and the Struggle for the Mediterranean. London: Pimlico. ISBN 978-0-7126-6608-4.
- Briscoe, John (2006). "The Second Punic War". In Astin, A. E.; Walbank, F. W.; Frederiksen, M. W.; Ogilvie, R. M. (eds.). The Cambridge Ancient History: Rome and the Mediterranean to 133 B.C. Vol. VIII (2 ed.). Cambridge: Cambridge University Press. pp. 44–80. ISBN 978-0-521-23448-1.
- Carey, Brian Todd (2007). Hannibal's Last Battle: Zama & the Fall of Carthage. Barnslet, South Yorkshire: Pen & Sword. ISBN 978-1-84415-635-1.
- Coarelli, Filippo (2002). "I ritratti di 'Mario' e 'Silla' a Monaco e il sepolcro degli Scipioni". Eutopia Nuova Serie (in Italian). II (1): 47–75. ISSN 1121-1628.
- Collins, Roger (1998). Spain: An Oxford Archaeological Guide. Oxford: Oxford University Press. ISBN 978-0-19-285300-4.
- Edwell, Peter (2015) [2011]. "War Abroad: Spain, Sicily, Macedon, Africa". In Hoyos, Dexter (ed.). A Companion to the Punic Wars. Chichester, West Sussex: John Wiley. pp. 320–338. ISBN 978-1-119-02550-4.
- Etcheto, Henri (2012). Les Scipions. Famille et pouvoir à Rome à l'époque républicaine (in French). Bordeaux: Ausonius Éditions. ISBN 978-2-35613-073-0.
- Goldsworthy, Adrian (2006). The Fall of Carthage: The Punic Wars 265–146 BC. London: Phoenix. ISBN 978-0-304-36642-2.
- Hoyos, Dexter (2015) [2011]. A Companion to the Punic Wars. Chichester, West Sussex: John Wiley. ISBN 978-1-1190-2550-4.
- Hoyos, Dexter (2015b). Mastering the West: Rome and Carthage at War. Oxford: Oxford University Press. ISBN 978-0-19-986010-4.
- Jones, Archer (1987). The Art of War in the Western World. Urbana: University of Illinois Press. ISBN 978-0-252-01380-5.
- Koon, Sam (2015) [2011]. "Phalanx and Legion: the "Face" of Punic War Battle". In Hoyos, Dexter (ed.). A Companion to the Punic Wars. Chichester, West Sussex: John Wiley. pp. 77–94. ISBN 978-1-1190-2550-4.
- Lazenby, John (1996). The First Punic War: A Military History. Stanford, California: Stanford University Press. ISBN 978-0-8047-2673-3.
- Lazenby, John (1998). Hannibal's War: A Military History of the Second Punic War. Warminster: Aris & Phillips. ISBN 978-0-85668-080-9.
- Miles, Richard (2011). Carthage Must be Destroyed. London: Penguin. ISBN 978-0-14-101809-6.
- Ñaco del Hoyo, Toni (2015) [2011]. "Roman Economy, Finance, and Politics in the Second Punic War". In Hoyos, Dexter (ed.). A Companion to the Punic Wars. Chichester, West Sussex: John Wiley. pp. 376–392. ISBN 978-1-1190-2550-4.
- Rawlings, Louis (2015) [2011]. "The War in Italy, 218–203". In Hoyos, Dexter (ed.). A Companion to the Punic Wars. Chichester, West Sussex: John Wiley. pp. 299–319. ISBN 978-1-1190-2550-4.
- Scullard, Howard H. (2006) [1989]. "Carthage and Rome". In Walbank, F. W.; Astin, A. E.; Frederiksen, M. W. & Ogilvie, R. M. (eds.). Cambridge Ancient History. Vol. VII, part 2 (2 ed.). Cambridge: Cambridge University Press. pp. 486–569. ISBN 978-0-521-23446-7.
- Zimmermann, Klaus (2015) [2011]. "Roman Strategy and Aims in the Second Punic War". In Hoyos, Dexter (ed.). A Companion to the Punic Wars. Oxford: Wiley-Blackwell. pp. 280–298. ISBN 978-1-405-17600-2.
