= Roman invasion of Africa (204–201 BC) =

Military campaign of the Second Punic War

- Part of the Second Punic War
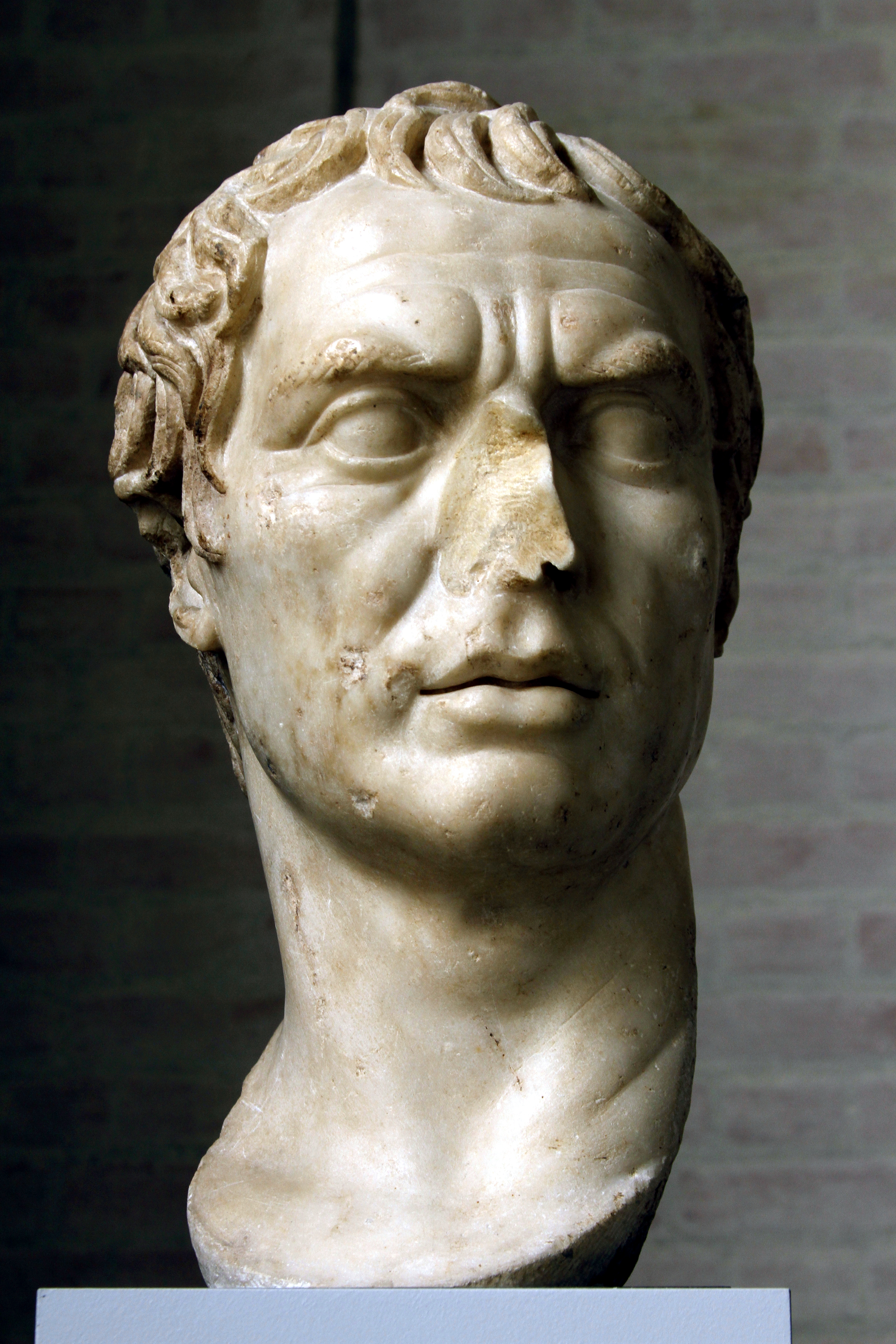
- 2nd century BC marble bust, identified as Scipio Africanus
Date	204–201 BC
Location	North Africa
Result	Roman victory

Belligerents
Carthage	Rome

Commanders and leaders
Hasdrubal Gisco; Syphax; Hannibal	Scipio Africanus

The Roman invasion of Africa lasted from 204 to 201 BC when a Roman army under Publius Cornelius Scipio landed near Utica and decisively defeated the Carthaginian Empire, thus ending the Second Punic War. The First Punic War was fought between Carthage and Rome for 23 years, from 264 to 241 BC. After a 23-year interbellum, war broke out again in 218 BC. After a further 13 years of war—marked by Hannibal's campaign in Italy—Scipio, Rome's most successful commander, was assigned to Sicily with the intention of invading the Carthaginian homeland in North Africa.

Scipio's army landed in North Africa in 204 BC, pillaged a large area and laid siege to the port-city of Utica, intending to use it as a permanent base and a harbour proof against the winter weather. A large Carthaginian army, supported by a larger force of allied Numidians, set up camp 11 kilometres (7 mi) south of Utica. This caused the Romans to break off the siege and withdraw into their own camp for the winter. In the spring of 203 BC, while feigning that he was renewing the siege of Utica, Scipio launched night attacks on the enemy camps, wiping out both armies. The Carthaginian army reassembled 120 kilometres (75 mi) from Utica, but the Romans marched to meet them, leaving the siege largely in the hands of the navy. At the battle of the Great Plains the Carthaginians were again badly beaten. A large Carthaginian-supporting force of Numidians retreated towards their capital, Cirta. They were pursued by an army of Roman-aligned Numidians supported by a Roman cadre. The Romans won the subsequent battle of Cirta and captured the city. Meanwhile, after the Great Plains the majority of the Roman army marched on Tunis, only 24 kilometres (15 mi) from the city of Carthage. Shortly after the Carthaginian fleet sailed from Carthage to relieve Utica. When it arrived it found that the Roman fleet had adopted a novel formation which they were unable to fully overcome; they retreated after a day's fighting.

The Carthaginian Senate recalled Hannibal from Italy and entered into peace negotiations with Scipio to end the war. A draft treaty was agreed, which the Roman Senate ratified, but because of mistrust and a surge in confidence when Hannibal arrived from Italy, Carthage repudiated it in early 202 BC. Hannibal set out to engage Scipio and after the protracted and hard-fought battle of Zama his army was annihilated. The Carthaginians sued for peace. The Romans enforced harsh terms in the subsequent peace treaty, agreed in 201 BC, although they did leave North Africa. Thereafter, it was clear that Carthage was politically subordinate to Rome.

== Primary sources ==
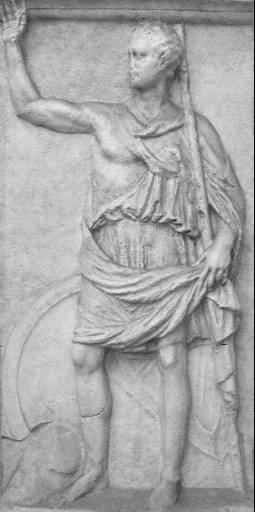
Polybius

The main source for almost every aspect of the Punic Wars (Note: The term Punic comes from the Latin word Punicus (or Poenicus), meaning "Carthaginian" and is a reference to the Carthaginians' Phoenician ancestry.) is the historian Polybius (c. 200 – c. 118 BC), a Greek sent to Rome in 167 BC as a hostage. His works include a now largely lost manual on military tactics, but he is best known for The Histories, written sometime after 146 BC. Polybius's work is considered broadly objective and largely neutral as between Carthaginian and Roman points of view. He was an analytical historian and wherever possible interviewed participants, from both sides, in the events he wrote about.

The accuracy of Polybius's account has been much debated over the past 150 years, but the modern consensus is to accept it largely at face value and the details of the war in modern sources are largely based on interpretations of Polybius's account. The modern historian Andrew Curry sees Polybius as being "fairly reliable"; while Craige Champion describes him as "a remarkably well-informed, industrious, and insightful historian". Much of Polybius's account of the Second Punic War is missing, or only exists in fragmentary form.

The account of the Roman historian Livy, who relied heavily on Polybius, is used by modern historians where Polybius's account is not extant. However, the classicist Adrian Goldsworthy says Livy's "reliability is often suspect"; and the historian Philip Sabin refers to Livy's "military ignorance". Dexter Hoyos describes Livy's account of the battle of Zama as "bizarrely at odds with Polybius' which he seems not to understand fully".

Other, later, ancient histories of the war exist, although often in fragmentary or summary form. (Note: Sources other than Polybius are discussed by Bernard Mineo in "Principal Literary Sources for the Punic Wars (apart from Polybius)".) Modern historians usually take into account the writings of Appian and Cassius Dio, two Greek authors writing during the Roman era; they are described by John Lazenby as "clearly far inferior" to Livy, but some otherwise-lost fragments of Polybius can be recovered from their texts. The Greek moralist Plutarch wrote several biographies of Roman commanders in his Parallel Lives. Other sources include coins, inscriptions, archaeological evidence and empirical evidence from reconstructions.

== Background ==
The approximate extent of territory controlled by Rome and Carthage immediately before the start of the Second Punic War

The First Punic War was fought between Carthage and Rome: the two main powers of the western Mediterranean in the 3rd century BC struggled for supremacy primarily on the Mediterranean island of Sicily and its surrounding waters, and also in North Africa. The war lasted for 23 years, from 264 to 241 BC, until the Carthaginians were defeated. Under the Treaty of Lutatius, Carthage evacuated Sicily and paid Rome an indemnity of 3,200 silver talents (Note: 3,200 talents was approximately 82,000 kg (81 long tons).) over ten years. Four years later, Rome seized Sardinia and Corsica on a cynical pretence and imposed a further 1,200 talent indemnity. (Note: 1,200 talents was approximately 30,000 kg (30 long tons) of silver.) actions which fuelled Carthaginian resentment. Polybius considered this act of bad faith by the Romans to be the single greatest cause of war with Carthage breaking out again nineteen years later.

In 236 BC, an army commanded by the leading Carthaginian general Hamilcar Barca landed in Carthaginian Iberia, now part of southeast Spain and Portugal, which became a quasi-monarchial, autonomous territory ruled by the Barcids. This expansion also gained Carthage silver mines, agricultural wealth, manpower, military facilities such as shipyards and territorial depth, enabling it to resist future Roman demands. Hamilcar ruled as viceroy until his death in 228 BC, when he was succeeded by his son-in-law, Hasdrubal, then his son Hannibal in 221 BC. In 226 BC, the Ebro Treaty established the Ebro River as the northern boundary of the Carthaginian sphere of influence. A little later Rome made a separate treaty of association with the city of Saguntum, well south of the Ebro. In 218 BC a Carthaginian army under Hannibal besieged, captured and sacked Saguntum. In early 219 BC Rome declared war on Carthage.

=== Second Punic War ===
Hannibal led a large Carthaginian army from Iberia, through Gaul, over the Alps and invaded mainland Italy. During the next three years Hannibal inflicted heavy defeats on the Romans at the battles of the Trebia, Lake Trasimene and Cannae. At the last of these alone, at least 67,500 Romans were killed or captured. The historian Toni Ñaco del Hoyo describes these as "great military calamities", Brian Carey writes that they brought Rome to the brink of collapse. Hannibal's army campaigned in Italy for 14 years before the survivors withdrew. There was also extensive fighting in Iberia (modern Spain and Portugal), Sicily, Sardinia and North Africa. In 211 BC the Romans suffered a severe reverse at the battle of the Upper Baetis and were penned back by the Carthaginians to the north-east corner of Iberia. In 210 BC Roman reinforcements stabilised the situation; later that year Publius Cornelius Scipio (Note: Publius Scipio was the bereaved son of the previous Roman co-commander in Iberia, also named Publius Scipio, and the nephew of the other co-commander, Gnaeus Scipio.) arrived with further Roman reinforcements to take command in Iberia. In a carefully planned assault in 209 BC, he captured the lightly defended centre of Carthaginian power in Iberia, New Carthage, During the following four years Scipio repeatedly defeated the Carthaginians and drove them out of Iberia in 205 BC.

=== Opposing forces ===
==== Rome ====
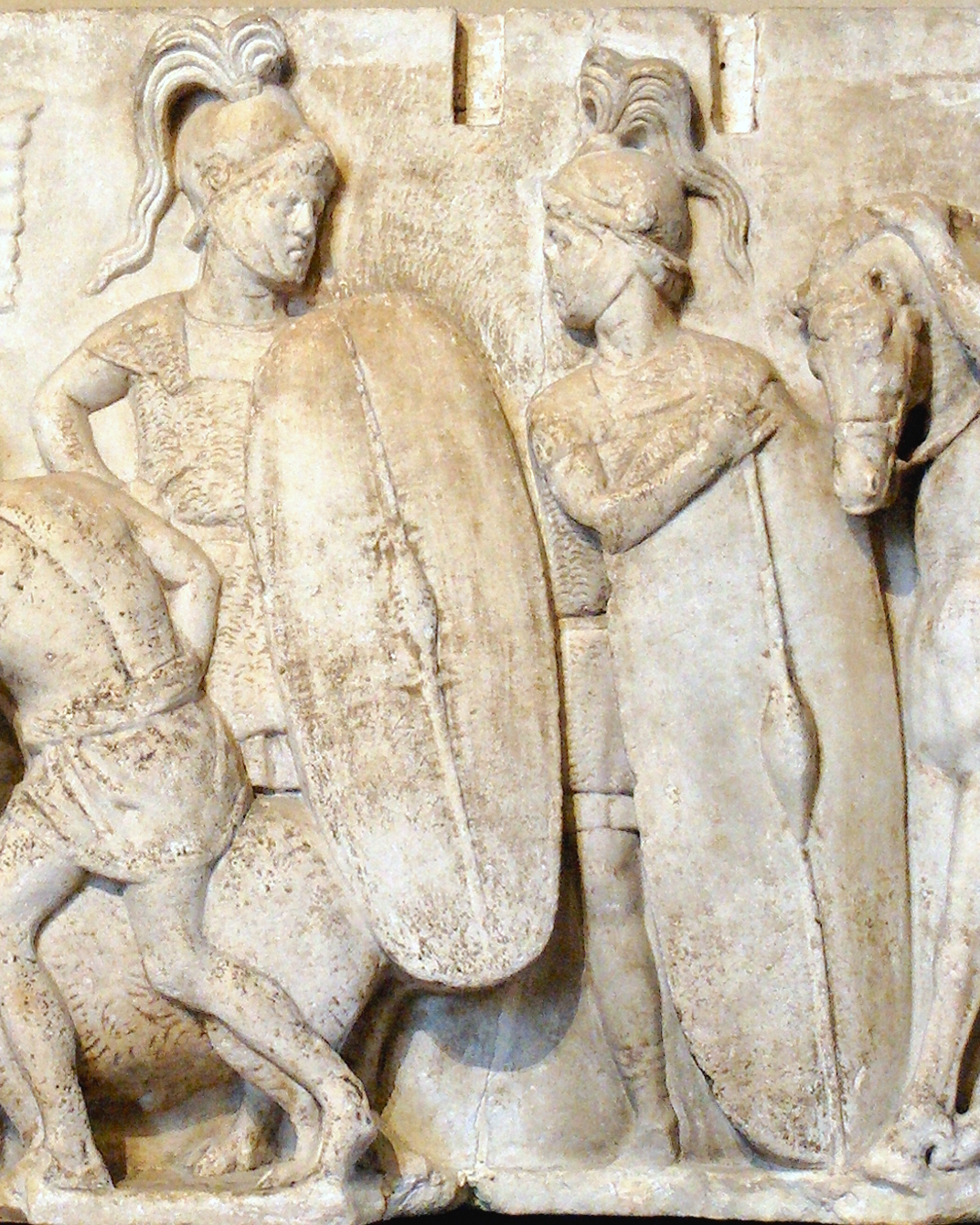
Detail from the Ahenobarbus relief showing two Roman foot-soldiers from the second century BC

Most male Roman citizens were eligible for military service and would serve as infantry, with a better-off minority providing a cavalry component. Traditionally, when at war the Romans would raise two legions, each of 4,200 infantry (Note: This could be increased to 5,000 in some circumstances, or, rarely, even more.) and 300 cavalry. Approximately 1,200 of the infantry – poorer or younger men unable to afford the armour and equipment of a standard legionary – served as javelin-armed skirmishers known as velites; they each carried several javelins, which would be thrown from a distance, a short sword and a 90-centimetre (3 ft) shield. The balance were equipped as heavy infantry, with body armour, a large shield and short thrusting swords. They were divided into three ranks, of which the front rank also carried two javelins, while the second and third ranks had a thrusting spear instead. Both legionary sub-units and individual legionaries fought in relatively open order.

It was the long-standing Roman procedure to elect two men each year as senior magistrates, known as consuls, who in time of war would each lead an army. An army was usually formed by combining a Roman legion with a similarly sized and equipped legion provided by their Latin allies; allied legions usually had a larger attached complement of cavalry than Roman ones. By this stage of the war, Roman armies were generally larger, typically consisting of four legions, two Roman and two provided by its allies, for a total of approximately 20,000 men. The Roman army which invaded Africa consisted of the now standard four legions, the Roman pair each reinforced to an unprecedented 6,200 infantry and the more usual 300 cavalry. Modern historians estimate the army to have totalled 25,000–35,000 men, including perhaps 2,500 cavalry.

==== Carthage ====
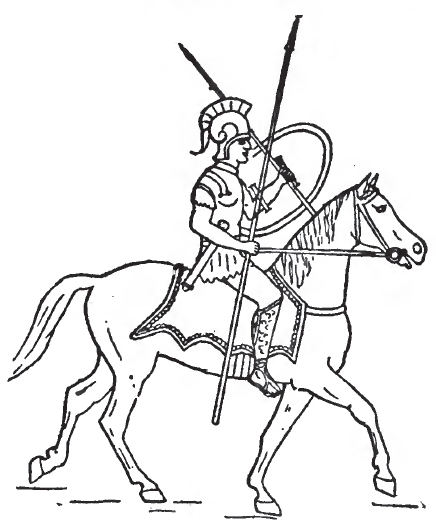
Carthaginian cavalryman as depicted in 1891

Carthaginian citizens only served in their army if there was a direct threat to the city of Carthage. When they did they fought as well-armoured heavy infantry armed with long thrusting spears, although they were notoriously ill-trained and ill-disciplined. In most circumstances Carthage recruited non-citizens to make up its army. (Note: Roman and Greek sources refer to these foreign fighters derogatively as "mercenaries", but the modern historian Adrian Goldsworthy describes this as "a gross oversimplification". They served under a variety of arrangements; for example, some were the regular troops of allied cities or kingdoms seconded to Carthage as part of formal treaties, some were from allied states fighting under their own leaders, many were volunteers from areas under Carthaginian control who were not Carthaginian citizens. (Which was largely reserved for inhabitants of the city of Carthage.)) Many were from North Africa and these were frequently referred to as "Libyans". The region provided several types of fighters, including: close order infantry equipped with large shields, helmets, short swords and long thrusting spears; javelin-armed light infantry skirmishers; close order shock cavalry (Note: "Shock" troops are those trained and used to close rapidly with an opponent, with the intention of breaking them before, or immediately upon, contact.) (also known as "heavy cavalry") carrying spears; and light cavalry skirmishers who threw javelins from a distance and avoided close combat. The latter were usually Numidians, as were many of the African light infantry. The close order African infantry and the citizen-militia both fought in a tightly-packed formation known as a phalanx. The Carthaginians also employed war elephants; North Africa had indigenous African forest elephants at the time. (Note: These elephants were typically about 2.5 m (8 ft 2 in) high at the shoulder and should not be confused with the larger African bush elephant.)

In addition both Iberia and Gaul provided many experienced infantry and cavalry. The infantry from these areas were unarmoured troops who would charge ferociously, but had a reputation for breaking off if a combat was protracted. The Gallic cavalry, and possibly some of the Iberians, wore armour and fought as close order troops; most or all of the mounted Iberians were light cavalry. Slingers were frequently recruited from the Balearic Islands. The Carthaginians relied on the troop types mentioned above to make up their armies which participated in the campaigns of 204 and 203 BC. The proportions and numbers of the different troop types in these armies are not known, other than that 4,000 freshly recruited Iberian warriors took part in the battle of the Great Plains in 203 BC. The competing Numidian forces which supported both the Carthaginians and the Romans consisted predominately or entirely of their javelin-armed light cavalry and infantry, with a high proportion of cavalry.

For the campaign of 202 BC, which climaxed in the battle of Zama, as well as an unclear number of troops raised in Africa the Carthaginians were reinforced by the armies of Hannibal and Mago who had been campaigning in southern and north-west Italy respectively until recalled. (Note: Mago died of wounds during the voyage to Africa.) A contingent of Ligurian came from north Italy and among Hannibal's veterans were many Bruttians from the south west; both fought as heavy infantry.

=== Prelude ===
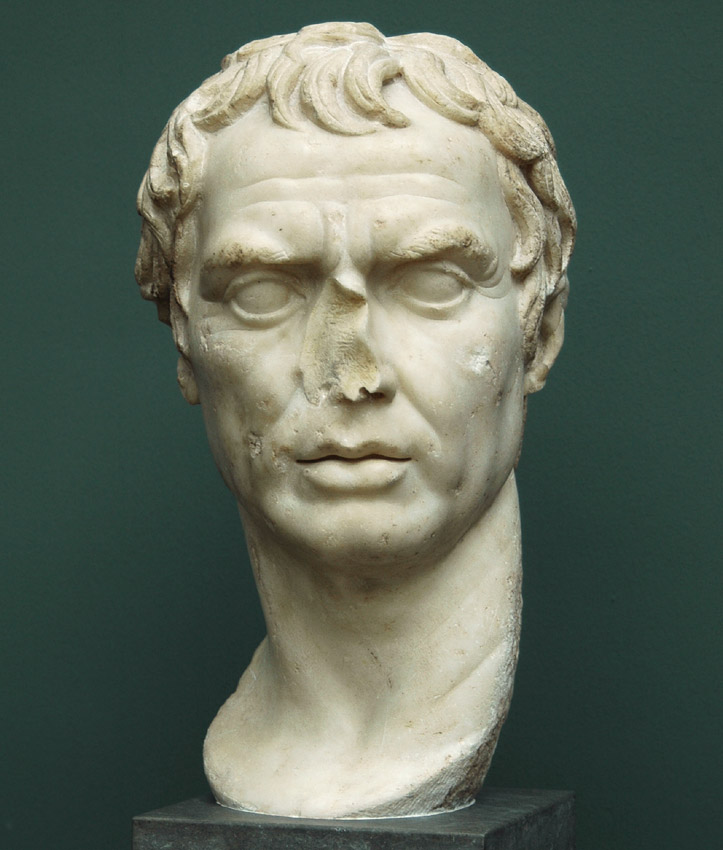
2nd century BC marble bust of Scipio

In 206 BC Scipio left Iberia after four years and returned to Italy. He was denied the triumph that he would normally have expected on the grounds that he had not occupied any of the magistracies of the cursus honorum, the sequential mixture of military and political administrative positions held by aspiring Roman politicians. He was elected to the senior position of consul in early 205, despite not meeting the age requirement. Scipio was already anticipating an invasion of North Africa, and while still in Spain had been negotiating with the Numidian leaders Masinissa and Syphax. He failed to win over the latter, but made an ally of the former.

Opinion was divided in Roman political circles as to whether an invasion of North Africa was excessively risky. Hannibal was still on Italian soil; there was the possibility of further Carthaginian invasions, shortly to be realised when Mago Barca landed in Liguria; the practical difficulties of an amphibious invasion and its logistical follow-up were considerable; and when the Romans had invaded North Africa in 256 BC during the First Punic War they had been driven out with heavy losses, which had re-energised the Carthaginians. Eventually a compromise was agreed: Scipio was given Sicily as his consular province, which was the best location for the Romans to launch an invasion of the Carthaginian homeland from and then logistically support it. Roman commitment was less than whole hearted, Scipio could not conscript troops for his consular army, as was usual, only call for volunteers.

In 216 the survivors of the Roman defeat at the Battle of Cannae had been formed into two legions and sent to Sicily as a punishment. They still formed the main part of the garrison of Sicily and Scipio used his volunteers to increase the strength of each of these to an unprecedented 6,500. The total number of men available to Scipio and how many of them travelled to Africa is unclear; Livy gives totals for the invasion force of either 12,200, 17,600 or 35,000. Modern historians estimate a combat strength of 25,000–30,000, of whom more than 90% were infantry. With up to half of the complement of his legions being fresh volunteers, and with no fighting having taken place on Sicily for the past five years, Scipio instigated a rigorous training regime, from drill by individual centuries, the basic Roman army manoeuvre unit of 80 men, to exercises by the full army. These lasted for approximately a year. At the same time the Romans assembled a vast quantity of food; Scipio intended to largely feed his army from stockpiles in Sicily, Sardinia and southern Italy, thus freeing it from the need to forage. War materiel was also prepared in great quantities, while merchant ships to transport this and his troops, and warships to escort the transports were built and crews trained.

Also during 205 BC thirty Roman ships under Scipio's second-in-command, Gaius Laelius, raided North Africa around Hippo Regius, gathering large quantities of loot and large numbers of captives. The Carthaginians initially believed that this was the anticipated invasion by Scipio and his full invasion force; they hastily strengthened fortifications and raised troops – including some units made up of Carthaginian citizens. Reinforcements were sent to Mago in an attempt to distract the Romans in Italy. Meanwhile a succession war had broken out in Numidia between the Roman-supporting Masinissa and the Carthaginian-inclined Syphax. Laelius re-established contact with Masinissa during his raid. Masinissa expressed dismay at how long it was taking the Romans to complete their preparations and land in Africa.

== Invasion ==
=== 204 BC ===
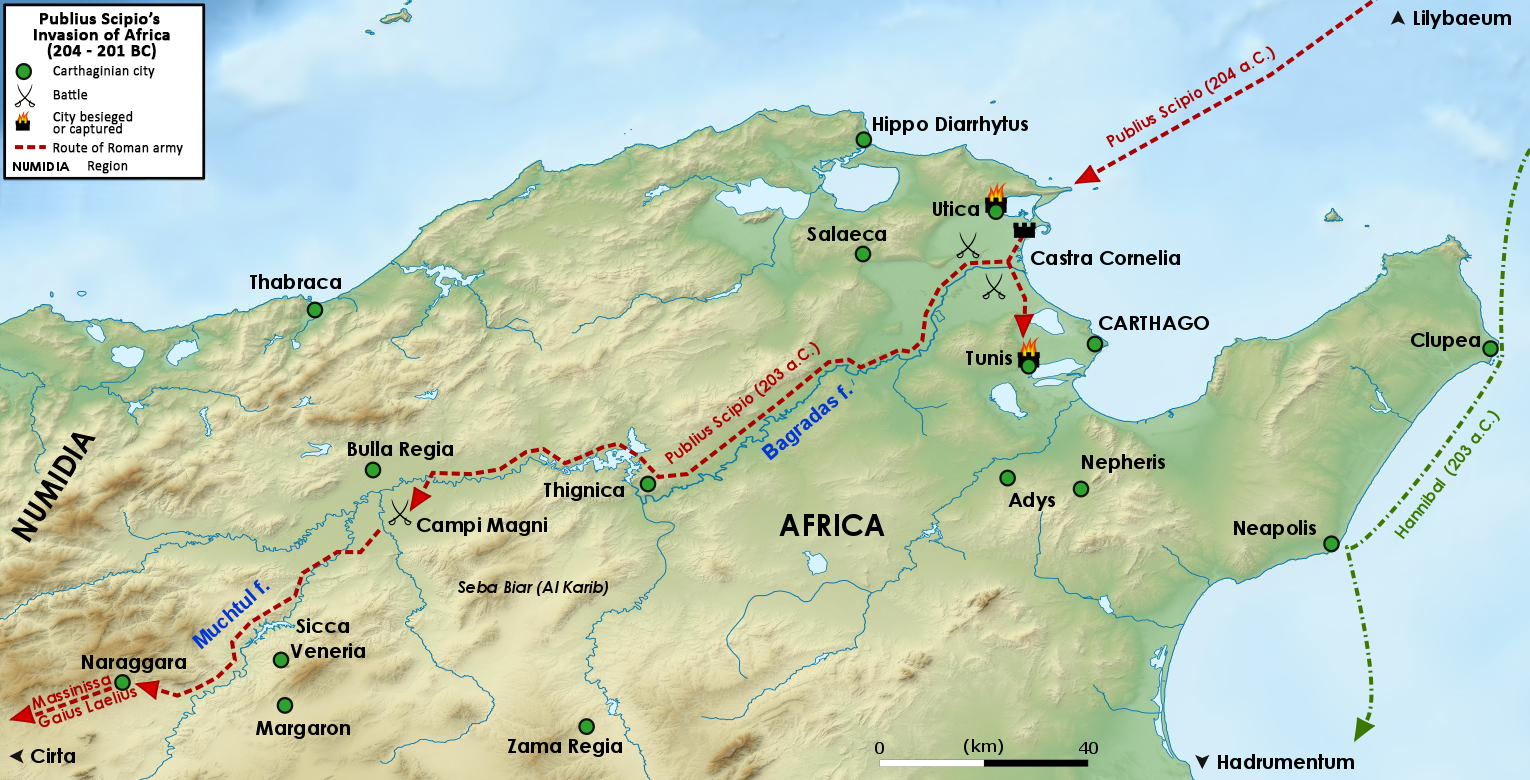
Scipio's military campaign in Africa 204–203 BC

In 204 BC, probably in June or July, the Roman army left Sicily in 400 transport ships, escorted by 40 galleys. Three days later they disembarked at Cape Farina 20 kilometres (12 mi) north of the large Carthaginian port of Utica. The ships which had landed the Roman army returned to Sicily to pick up supplies. Scipio wished to build up a stock of food and water for forty-five days, with a third of the food already cooked: as bread or biscuit. The locals fled and Carthage's immediate response, a scouting party of 500 cavalry, was defeated with the loss of its commander and the general in overall charge of responding to the invasion. The area was pillaged and 8,000 captives were taken, to be sent back to Sicily as slaves. A large fortified camp was established at Ghar el-Melh which was known as Castra Cornelia. Masinissa had been recently defeated by his Numidian rival Syphax, wounded and had his army scattered. Syphax had been persuaded to take firm action by the Carthaginian general Hasdrubal Gisco and by his assertive new wife: Hasdrubal's daughter Sophonisba. Masinissa joined the Romans with either 200 or 2,000 men, the sources differ.

Carthage sent a larger party to probe the Roman position, about 4,000 soldiers under a general called Hanno. His command of mixed Numidians and Carthaginian citizens based itself at Salaeca, 24 kilometres (15 mi) from the Romans, and did little scouting. Following a stratagem agreed with Scipio, Masinissa's cavalry raided Hanno's force who chased them off and then pursued them into a Roman ambush. Hanno and 1,000 of his men were killed or taken prisoner. The survivors were in turn pursued for 50 kilometres (30 mi), only 1,000 escaped. The Romans pillaged an ever-wider area, sending their loot and prisoners to Sicily in the ships bringing their supplies. Granaries were constructed at Castra Cornelia to hold the supplies of food and materiel; the sources mention a delivery of 1,200 togas and 12,000 tunics.

==== Siege of Utica ====
Wanting a more permanent base, and a port more resilient to the bad weather to be expected when winter came, Scipio besieged Utica. The siege dragged on into the winter and a Carthaginian army under Hasdrubal set up a fortified camp 11 kilometres (7 mi) from the Romans with a reported 33,000 men. Syphax joined him, establishing his own camp a mile (2 km) away with a reported 60,000 troops. The large size of both of these armies as reported by ancient historians have been questioned by their modern counterparts. Nevertheless, it is accepted that the Romans were considerably outnumbered, in particular in terms of cavalry. The Romans were besieging Utica, but were themselves now blockaded on the landward side. The Carthaginian camp was solidly constructed, with timber-built barracks; the Numidian one less so, with the accommodation for the soldiers being largely constructed of, and roofed with, reeds. Scipio sent emissaries to Syphax to attempt to persuade him to defect. Syphax in turn offered to broker peace terms. A series of exchanges of negotiating parties followed. With his delegations Scipio sent junior officers disguised as slaves to report back on the layout and construction of the Numidian camp.

=== 203 BC ===
==== Battle of Utica ====
Scipio drew out the negotiations with Syphax, stating that he was in broad agreement with the proposition, but that his senior officers were not yet convinced. As the better weather of spring approached, Scipio made an announcement to his troops that he would shortly attempt to storm the defences of Utica and began preparations to do so. Simultaneously he was planning a night attack on both camps. Local knowledge and careful scouting identified the routes least likely to cause problems at night, and Scipio briefed his senior officers carefully. On the night of the attack two columns set out, one commanded by Gaius Laelius, a legate and the Roman army's second in command, who had years of experience of operating under Scipio. This force consisted of about half the Romans and was accompanied by the Numidians. Its target was Syphax's camp. Scipio led the balance of the Roman force against the Carthaginian camp.

Thanks to the careful prior reconnoitring both forces reached the positions from which they were to start their attacks without issue, while Masinissa's Numidian cavalry positioned themselves in small groups so as to cover every route out of the two enemy camps. Laelius's column attacked first, storming the camp of Syphax's Numidians and concentrating on setting fire to as many of the reed huts as possible. The camp dissolved into chaos, with many of its Numidian occupants oblivious of the Roman attack and thinking that the barracks had caught fire accidentally. The Carthaginians heard the commotion and saw the blaze, and some of them set off to help extinguish the fire. With pre-planned coordination Scipio's contingent then attacked. They cut down the Carthaginians heading for their ally's camp, stormed Hasdrubal's camp and attempted to set fire to the wooden housing. The fire spread between the close-spaced barracks. Carthaginians rushed out into the dark and confusion, without armour or weapons, either trying to escape the flames or to fight the fire. The organised and prepared Romans cut them down. Polybius writes that Hasdrubal escaped from his burning camp with only 2,500 men. Numidian losses are not recorded.

By the diplomatic standards of the time, Scipio launching a surprise attack while in the midst of peace negotiations was ethically dubious. With no Carthaginian field army to threaten them, the Romans pressed their siege of Utica and pillaged an extensive area of North Africa with large and far-ranging raids. As well as gold and slaves the Romans accumulated large amounts of foodstuffs. This was added to the stocks already built up by shipping grain from Sicily.

==== Battle of the Great Plains ====
When word of the defeat reached Carthage there was panic, with some wanting to renew the peace negotiations. The Carthaginian Senate also heard demands for Hannibal's army to be recalled. A decision was reached to fight on with locally available resources. A force of 4,000 Iberian warriors arrived in Carthage; their strength was exaggerated to 10,000 to maintain morale. Hasdrubal raised further local troops with whom to reinforce the survivors of Utica. Syphax remained loyal and joined Hasdrubal with what was left of his army. The combined force is estimated at 30,000 and they established a strong camp on a flat plain by the Bagradas River known as the Great Plains within 30–50 days of the defeat at Utica. This was near modern Souk el Kremis and about 120 kilometres (75 mi) from Utica.

Hearing of this, Scipio immediately marched most of his men to the scene. The size of his army is not known, but it is agreed that it was outnumbered by the Carthaginians. A sufficient force was left to hold the Roman camps and to continue the siege of Utica. After several days of skirmishing both armies committed to a pitched battle. Upon being charged by the Romans and Masinissa's Numidians all of those Carthaginians who had been involved in the debacle at Utica turned and fled; morale had not recovered. Only the Iberians stood and fought. They were enveloped by the well-drilled Roman legions and wiped out. Hasdrubal fled to Carthage, where he was demoted and exiled.

The majority of the Romans remained in the area under Scipio, devastating the countryside and capturing and sacking many towns. They then moved to Tunis, which had been abandoned by the Carthaginians and was only 24 kilometres (15 mi) from the city of Carthage. This cut Carthage off from its hinterland.

==== Battle of Cirta ====
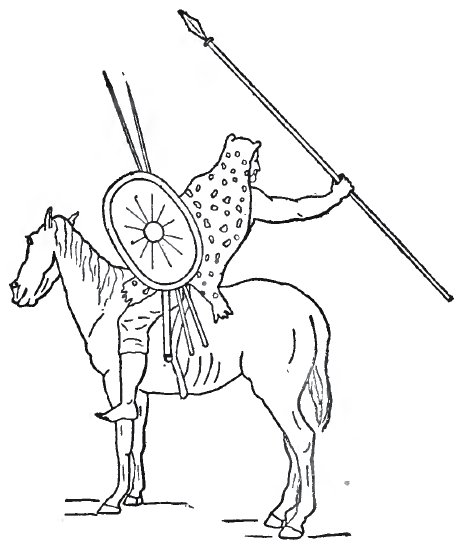
A Numidian cavalryman as imagined in 1891

After the battle of the Great Plains Masinissa's Numidians pursued their defeated countrymen under Syphax; accompanied by part of the Roman force, under Laelius. Syphax withdrew as far as his capital, Cirta, where he recruited more troops to supplement those survivors who had stayed with him on the retreat from the Great Plains. This force commenced an intensive training regime. Masinissa and Laelius's men took 15 days to reach Masinissa's ancestral lands, those of the Massyli. The historian Peter Edwell comments that venturing so far into the interior was a high-risk enterprise. However, Masinissa was proclaimed king and Syphax's administrators and garrisons were expelled. Not wanting to allow Syphax to train his new troops up Masinissa and Laelius pressed on towards Cirta.

Syphax determined to oppose the allied army immediately. They met at the battle of Cirta, which started as a sprawling cavalry engagement, with each side sending detachments to hurl javelins at the other and then withdrawing. Having more cavalry, Syphax's army gained the upper hand. Laelius then inserted groups of Roman light infantry between Masinissa's cavalry detachments. These men were able to hold off the enemy cavalry and form an approximate battle line. The Roman heavy infantry were then able to advance. Seeing these legionaries advancing to join the battle, Syphax's troops broke and fled. Syphax attempted to rally his men, but his horse was shot and he was thrown and captured.

Many of Syphax's defeated and demoralised troops fled back to Cirta. Masinissa pursued them with the cavalry; Laelius followed with the infantry. After Syphax was paraded beneath the city walls in chains Cirta surrendered to Masinissa, who then took over much of Syphax's kingdom and joined it to his own. (Note: Masinissa also married Syphax's wife, Sophonisba, Hasdrubal's daughter.) Syphax was taken as a prisoner to Italy, where he died.

=== 202 BC ===
==== Naval battle ====
Over the winter the Carthaginians had increased the number of equipped and crewed war galleys they had, and now felt ready to challenge the Romans at sea. At some point while the Roman army was in Tunis the Carthaginian fleet left port and sailed for Utica, intending to lift the siege and hoping to wipe out the Roman fleet while doing so. Although Utica is only 56 kilometres (35 mi) north of Carthage, the Carthaginian ships did not arrive until the next morning. Overnight the Romans had expediently lashed the whole of their fleet into one unit, with several ranks of transports in front of the specialist war galleys. On the foremost row of transports were 1,000 soldiers with a large supply of javelins.

The Carthaginian fleet attacked shortly after sunrise, but the improvised Roman formation frustrated them. They faced a tight-locked wall of transports, whose higher freeboard meant the Carthaginians had to improvise grappling hooks or ladders to board them. Meanwhile the Roman marines could hurl javelins down onto the open decks of the Carthaginian galleys from relatively protected positions. By the end of the day the Carthaginians had managed to capture, cut loose, and tow away 60 Roman transports. They made their way back to Carthage with their captives, leaving the majority of the transports and all of the Roman war galleys unscathed.

==== Armistice ====
The Carthaginian Senate recalled both Hannibal and Mago from Italy, and entered into peace discussions with Scipio to end the war. Scipio demanded the handing over of all prisoners and deserters, Carthaginian withdrawal from Italy and Spain, the handing over of their entire navy bar a coastal defence force, supply the Romans with a vast amount of grain, and pay 5,000 talents as an indemnity. (Note: 5,000 talents was approximately 135,000 kilograms (133 long tons) of silver.) The Carthaginians considered themselves to be in a desperate situation and accepted the demanding terms Scipio put forward with little attempt at negotiation. The Roman Senate ratified the draft treaty, but because of mistrust and a surge in confidence when Hannibal arrived from Italy, Carthage repudiated it in early 202 BC.

==== Battle of Zama ====
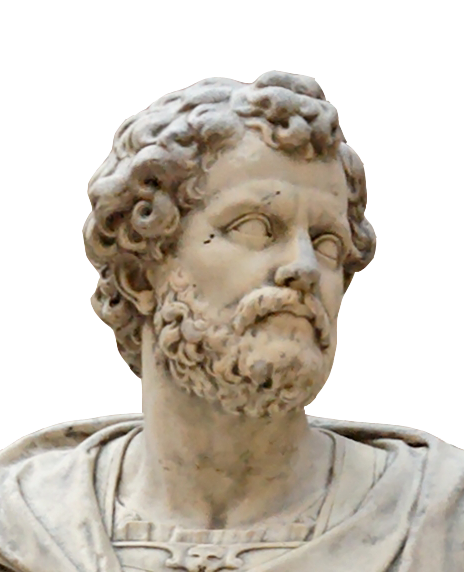
1704 French bust of Hannibal

Hannibal was placed in command of another army, formed of his and Mago's veterans from Italy and newly raised troops from Africa, with 80 war elephants but few cavalry. The decisive Battle of Zama followed in October 202 BC. Hannibal was supported by 2,000 Numidian cavalry commanded by a relative of Syphax's, Tychaeus. Masinissa fought alongside the Romans with 6,000 infantry and 4,000 cavalry.

Hannibal attempted to use the elephants to break into the Roman infantry formation, but the Romans countered them effectively and they routed back through the Carthaginian ranks. The Roman and allied Numidian cavalry then attacked the Carthaginian cavalry, driving them from the field and pursuing them. The two sides' infantry fought fiercely but inconclusively until the Roman and Numidian cavalry returned and attacked the Carthaginian rear. The Carthaginian formation collapsed; Hannibal was one of the few to escape.

After the Romans had returned to Utica, Scipio received word that a Numidian army under Syphax's son Vermina was marching to Carthage's assistance. This was intercepted and surrounded by a Roman force largely made up of cavalry and defeated. The number of Numidians involved is not known, but Livy records that more than 16,000 were killed or captured. This was the last battle of the Second Punic War.

== Peace ==
With the Carthaginians completely defeated the peace treaty the Romans subsequently imposed on them was harsh. It stripped them of all of their non-African territories and some of their African ones. An indemnity of 10,000 silver talents (Note: 10,000 talents was approximately 269,000 kilograms (265 long tons) of silver.) was to be paid over 50 years. Hostages were taken. Carthage was forbidden to possess war elephants and its fleet was restricted to 10 warships. It was prohibited from waging war outside Africa, and in Africa only with Rome's express permission. Many senior Carthaginians wanted to reject it, but Hannibal spoke strongly in its favour and it was accepted in spring 201 BC. Henceforth it was clear Carthage was politically subordinate to Rome. Scipio was awarded a triumph and received the agnomen "Africanus". Masinissa established himself as the senior ruler in Numidia.

=== Third Punic War ===
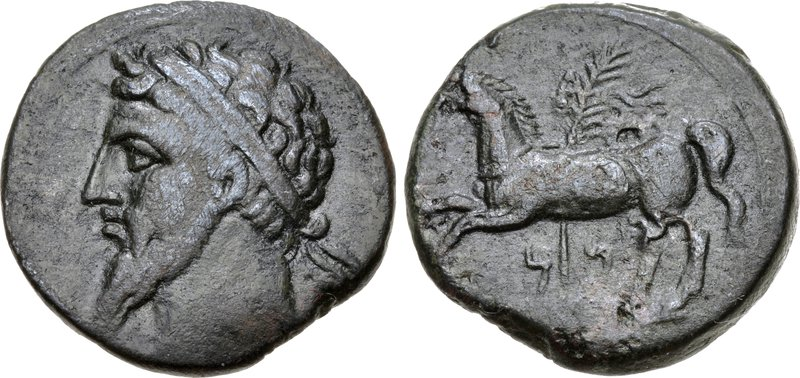
A coin issued by King Masinissa

Masinissa exploited the prohibition on Carthage waging war to repeatedly raid and seize Carthaginian territory with impunity. Carthage appealed to Rome, which always backed their Numidian ally. In 149 BC, fifty years after the end of the Second Punic War, Carthage sent an army, under Hasdrubal the Boeotarch, against Masinissa, (Note: Masinissa, now aged 88, was still able to lead his army into battle and father children. He died in 148 BC.) the treaty notwithstanding. The campaign ended in disaster at the battle of Oroscopa and anti-Carthaginian factions in Rome used the illicit military action as a pretext to prepare a punitive expedition. The Third Punic War began later in 149 BC when a large Roman army landed in North Africa and besieged Carthage. In the spring of 146 BC the Romans launched their final assault, systematically destroying the city and killing its inhabitants; 50,000 survivors were sold into slavery. The formerly Carthaginian territories became the Roman province of Africa. It was a century before the site of Carthage was rebuilt as a Roman city.

== Notes, citations and sources ==
=== Sources ===
- Bagnall, Nigel (1999). The Punic Wars: Rome, Carthage and the Struggle for the Mediterranean. London: Pimlico. ISBN 978-0-7126-6608-4.
- Le Bohec, Yann (2015) [2011]. "The "Third Punic War": The Siege of Carthage (148–146 BC)". In Hoyos, Dexter (ed.). A Companion to the Punic Wars. Chichester, West Sussex: John Wiley. pp. 430–446. ISBN 978-1-1190-2550-4.
- Briscoe, John (2006). "The Second Punic War". In Astin, A. E.; Walbank, F. W.; Frederiksen, M. W.; Ogilvie, R. M. (eds.). The Cambridge Ancient History: Rome and the Mediterranean to 133 B.C. Vol. VIII. Cambridge: Cambridge University Press. pp. 44–80. ISBN 978-0-521-23448-1.
- Caven, Brian (1992). The Punic Wars. New York: Barnes & Noble. ISBN 978-0-88029-892-6.
- Carey, Brian Todd (2007). Hannibal's Last Battle: Zama & the Fall of Carthage. Barnslet, South Yorkshire: Pen & Sword. ISBN 978-1-84415-635-1.
- Champion, Craige B. (2015) [2011]. "Polybius and the Punic Wars". In Hoyos, Dexter (ed.). A Companion to the Punic Wars. Chichester, West Sussex: John Wiley. pp. 95–110. ISBN 978-1-1190-2550-4.
- Coarelli, Filippo (2002). "I ritratti di 'Mario' e 'Silla' a Monaco e il sepolcro degli Scipioni". Eutopia Nuova Serie (in Italian). II (1): 47–75. ISSN 1121-1628.
- Collins, Roger (1998). Spain: An Oxford Archaeological Guide. Oxford: Oxford University Press. ISBN 978-0-19-285300-4.
- Curry, Andrew (2012). "The Weapon that Changed History". Archaeology. 65 (1): 32–37. JSTOR 41780760.
- Edwell, Peter (2015) [2011]. "War Abroad: Spain, Sicily, Macedon, Africa". In Hoyos, Dexter (ed.). A Companion to the Punic Wars. Chichester, West Sussex: John Wiley. pp. 320–338. ISBN 978-1-119-02550-4.
- Etcheto, Henri (2012). Les Scipions. Famille et pouvoir à Rome à l'époque républicaine (in French). Bordeaux: Ausonius Éditions. ISBN 978-2-35613-073-0.
- Goldsworthy, Adrian (2006). The Fall of Carthage: The Punic Wars 265–146 BC. London: Phoenix. ISBN 978-0-304-36642-2.
- Hau, Lisa (2016). Moral History from Herodotus to Diodorus Siculus. Edinburgh: Edinburgh University Press. ISBN 978-1-4744-1107-3.
- Hoyos, Dexter (2003). Hannibal's Dynasty: Power and politics in the Western Mediterranean, 247–183 BC. London; New York: Routledge. ISBN 978-0-203-41782-9.
- Hoyos, Dexter (2015) [2011]. A Companion to the Punic Wars. Chichester, West Sussex: John Wiley. ISBN 978-1-1190-2550-4.
- Hoyos, Dexter (2015b). Mastering the West: Rome and Carthage at War. Oxford: Oxford University Press. ISBN 978-0-19-986010-4.
- Jones, Archer (1987). The Art of War in the Western World. Urbana: University of Illinois Press. ISBN 978-0-252-01380-5.
- Koon, Sam (2015) [2011]. "Phalanx and Legion: the "Face" of Punic War Battle". In Hoyos, Dexter (ed.). A Companion to the Punic Wars. Chichester, West Sussex: John Wiley. pp. 77–94. ISBN 978-1-1190-2550-4.
- Kunze, Claudia (2015) [2011]. "Carthage and Numidia, 201–149". In Hoyos, Dexter (ed.). A Companion to the Punic Wars. Chichester, West Sussex: John Wiley. pp. 395–411. ISBN 978-1-1190-2550-4.
- Lazenby, John (1996). The First Punic War: A Military History. Stanford, California: Stanford University Press. ISBN 978-0-8047-2673-3.
- Lazenby, John (1998). Hannibal's War: A Military History of the Second Punic War. Warminster: Aris & Phillips. ISBN 978-0-85668-080-9.
- Miles, Richard (2011). Carthage Must be Destroyed. London: Penguin. ISBN 978-0-14-101809-6.
- Miles, Richard (2015) [2011]. "Hannibal and Propaganda". In Hoyos, Dexter (ed.). A Companion to the Punic Wars. Chichester, West Sussex: John Wiley. pp. 260–280. ISBN 978-1-1190-2550-4.
- Mineo, Bernard (2015) [2011]. "Principal Literary Sources for the Punic Wars (apart from Polybius)". In Hoyos, Dexter (ed.). A Companion to the Punic Wars. Chichester, West Sussex: John Wiley. pp. 111–128. ISBN 978-1-1190-2550-4.
- Ñaco del Hoyo, Toni (2015) [2011]. "Roman Economy, Finance, and Politics in the Second Punic War". In Hoyos, Dexter (ed.). A Companion to the Punic Wars. Chichester, West Sussex: John Wiley. pp. 376–392. ISBN 978-1-1190-2550-4.
- Purcell, Nicholas (1995). "On the Sacking of Carthage and Corinth". In Innes, Doreen; Hine, Harry & Pelling, Christopher (eds.). Ethics and Rhetoric: Classical Essays for Donald Russell on his Seventy Fifth Birthday. Oxford: Clarendon. pp. 133–48. ISBN 978-0-19-814962-0.
- Rawlings, Louis (1996). "Celts, Spaniards, and Samnites: Warriors in a Soldier's War". Bulletin of the Institute of Classical Studies. Supplement. The Second Punic War: A Reappraisal. 2 (67). London: Institute of Classical Studies/Oxford University Press: 81–95. ISSN 2398-3264. JSTOR 43767904.
- Richardson, John (2015) [2011]. "Spain, Africa, and Rome after Carthage". In Hoyos, Dexter (ed.). A Companion to the Punic Wars. Chichester, West Sussex: John Wiley. pp. 467–482. ISBN 978-1-1190-2550-4.
- Sabin, Philip (1996). "The Mechanics of Battle in the Second Punic War". Bulletin of the Institute of Classical Studies. Supplement. 67 (67): 59–79. JSTOR 43767903.
- Scullard, Howard (1955). "Carthage". Greece & Rome. 2 (3): 98–107. doi:10.1017/S0017383500022166. JSTOR 641578. S2CID 248519024.
- Scullard, Howard H. (2002). A History of the Roman World, 753 to 146 BC. London: Routledge. ISBN 978-0-415-30504-4.
- Scullard, Howard H. (2006) [1989]. "Carthage and Rome". In Walbank, F. W.; Astin, A. E.; Frederiksen, M. W. & Ogilvie, R. M. (eds.). Cambridge Ancient History: Volume 7, Part 2, 2nd Edition. Cambridge: Cambridge University Press. pp. 486–569. ISBN 978-0-521-23446-7.
- Shutt, Rowland (1938). "Polybius: A Sketch". Greece & Rome. 8 (22): 50–57. doi:10.1017/S001738350000588X. JSTOR 642112. S2CID 162905667.
- Sidwell, Keith C.; Jones, Peter V. (1998). The World of Rome: an Introduction to Roman Culture. Cambridge: Cambridge University Press. ISBN 978-0-521-38600-5.
- Walbank, F.W. (1990). Polybius. Vol. 1. Berkeley: University of California Press. ISBN 978-0-520-06981-7.
- Zimmermann, Klaus (2015) [2011]. "Roman Strategy and Aims in the Second Punic War". In Hoyos, Dexter (ed.). A Companion to the Punic Wars. Oxford: Wiley-Blackwell. pp. 280–298. ISBN 978-1-405-17600-2.
