= F. W. Walbank =

English classical scholar and historian (1909–2008)

F. W. Walbank CBE FBA
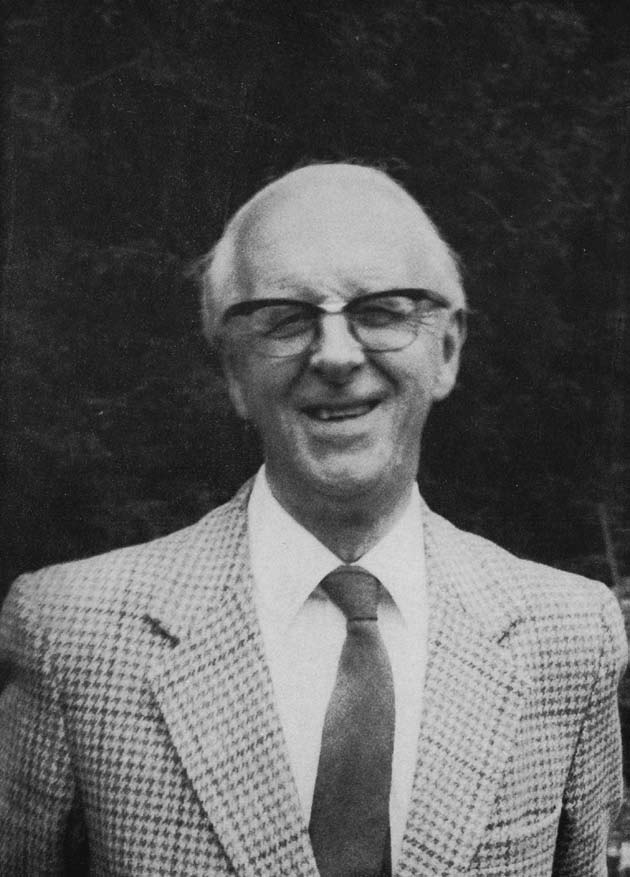
- Born: Frank William Walbank; 10 December 1909; Bingley, Bradford, England
- Died: 23 October 2008 (aged 98); Cambridge, England

Academic background
- Education: Peterhouse, Cambridge

Academic work
- Discipline: Ancient History
- Institutions: University of Liverpool

Frank William Walbank, CBE, FBA (/ˈwɔːlˌbæŋk/; 10 December 1909 – 23 October 2008) was a scholar of ancient history, particularly the history of Polybius. He was born in Bingley, Yorkshire, and died in Cambridge.

== Early life and education ==
Born at Bingley, Yorkshire, son of schoolmaster Albert Joseph David Walbank (1879–1967) and Clarice (1880–1965), née Fletcher, Walbank attended Bradford Grammar School and went on to study Classics at Peterhouse, Cambridge. His father was the son of a cobbler, but had left the family business on winning a scholarship and became a teacher.

== Career ==
From 1951 to 1977, Walbank was Rathbone Professor of Ancient History and Classical Archaeology at the University of Liverpool. After retirement he was a professor emeritus at Liverpool and an Honorary Fellow of Peterhouse.

Walbank held visiting positions at the University of Pittsburgh, the University of California, Berkeley, and the Institute for Advanced Study in Princeton.

Walbank's published works include Aratos of Sicyon (1933), Philip V of Macedon (1940), The Awful Revolution (1946; 1969), Polybius (1972; 1990), A Historical Commentary on Polybius, 3 vols. (1957, 1967, 1979), The Hellenistic World (1981) and, with N.G.L. Hammond, A History of Macedonia, Vol. III: 336–167 BC. He also served as the joint editor of volumes 7 and 8 of the Cambridge Ancient History.

In 1933, Walbank's essay "Aratos of Sicyon" won the Cambridge University Thirlwall Prize. He was elected a foreign member of the Royal Netherlands Academy of Arts and Sciences in 1981.

== Additional sources ==
- Momigliano, Arnaldo. "F.W. Walbank", The Journal of Roman Studies, Vol. 74. (1984).
