= Battle of Carteia =

Land battle of the Second Punic War

- Part of the Second Punic War
- Map of the Second Punic War
Date	206 BC
Location	The Guadalquivir River mouth 36°47′N 6°21′W
Result	Roman victory

Belligerents
Roman Republic	Carthage

Commanders and leaders
Lucius Marcius Septimus	Hanno

Strength
Unknown	6,000 soldiers (including 4,000 Celtiberians); 700 Cavalry

The Battle of Carteia, also known by the modern name Battle of the Guadalquivir, took place during the Second Punic War in 206 BC between the forces of Carthage and the Roman Republic. The name "Battle of the Guadalquivir" is anachronistic, since the river's name "el Guadalquivir", from the Arabic al-wadi al-kabir ("the great valley"), was not used until the Islamic conquest of Spain over nine hundred years after the battle. The Carthaginian forces were commanded by Hanno and the Romans by Gaius Lucius Marcius Septimus. The battle resulted in a Roman victory.

== Context ==
After the Carthaginian defeat at the Battle of Ilipa, the Turdetani flocked en masse to the Roman banner. Hasdrubal Gisco and Mago Barca were thereafter confined with their troops to Gadir where they were protected from a Roman assault. After the Revolt of Sucro and the Revolt of Indibilis and Mandonius, Publius Cornelius Scipio Africanus sent Lucius Marcius Septimus with a small force uninhibited by baggage so as to augment their speed down the Guadalquivir River to the river mouth. There, the Romans encountered the Carthaginian prefect Hanno who was attempting to recruit a force of Celtiberian mercenaries for Mago Barca, as Mago and Hanno the Elder had just lost another army in Celtiberia to Marcus Junius Silanus.

== The battle ==
Hanno had at his command 700 cavalry and 6,000 infantrymen, of whom 4,000 were Celtiberian warriors and the rest Africans. Lucius Marcius Septimus attacked the Carthaginian force and surrounded them on a hill.

The mercenaries quickly opened negotiations with Marcius, who asked Hanno to hand over any deserters and prisoners that he had in his care. He further asked them for payment, after which they could reach an agreement. Once the mercenaries had come down from the hill, Marcius gave his final demand for the mercenary forces to surrender their arms and return to their respective cities.

However, the last demand infuriated the Celtiberians, whose culture established that death was preferable to surrender their weapons. They refused to comply and promptly resumed battle. After brave resistance from the Carthaginian forces, over half their number were slaughtered and the rest were able to escape.

== Consequences ==
The Celtiberian mercenaries and African fighters who were able to escape fled towards the army of Mago Barca, who had arrived on the coast at the head of a fleet of 60 ships to pick up the survivors. Carthaginian territory in the region was reduced to the city of Gadir after the fight. Mago Barca placed the remainder of his army on ships in an attempt to take back Cartago Nova. Upon reaching the city with the Carthaginian army, which numbered only a few thousand, Barca's army anchored and disembarked. They laid siege to the city but were repulsed by Roman forces at the Battle of Cartagena in 206 BC.

Mago Barca returned defeated to Gadir where he found that the local population had shut their gates to his army as they had begun negotiations with the Romans. Shortly thereafter, Mago abandoned the city and sailed to the Balearic Islands, spending the winter at Maó-Mahón. The following year, he sailed north to Italy where he hoped to instigate a revolt amongst the Ligures people.

== See also ==
- Punic Wars
- Mago Barca
