= Battles of Kroton =

Battles in 204 and 203 BC

Battles of Crotone
- Part of the Second Punic War
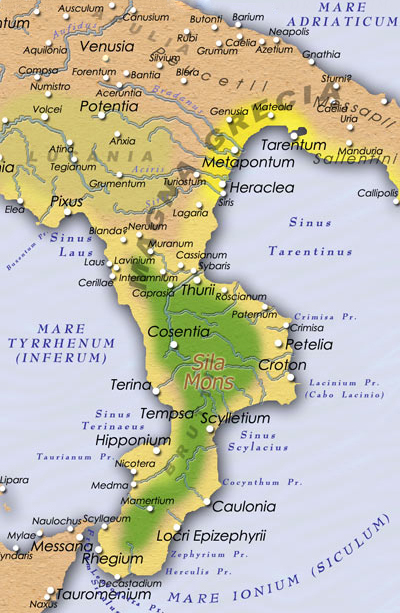
- Magna Graecia and Bruttium in the 3rd century BC
Date	204 BC
Location	Crotone, Calabria, present-day Italy 39.0833°N 17.1167°E
Result	Inconclusive

Belligerents
Carthage	Roman Republic

Commanders and leaders
Hannibal	Publius Sempronius Tuditanus; Publius Licinius Crassus

Strength
Unknown	Four legions

Casualties and losses
	1,200 killed

The Battles of Kroton in 204 and 203 BC were, as well as the raid in Cisalpine Gaul, the last larger scale engagements between the Romans and the Carthaginians in Italy during the Second Punic War. After Hannibal’s retreat to Bruttium due to the Metaurus debacle, the Romans continuously tried to block his forces from gaining access to the Ionian Sea and cut his eventual escape to Carthage by capturing Kroton, the last port which had remained in his hands after years of fighting.

== Sources ==
The last exploits of Hannibal in Italy are recorded by Titus Livius (Livy) in his Ab urbe condita (History of Rome). The other comparatively detailed account belongs to Appian, who dedicated a special part of his Roman History to the Hannibal's invasion. Some additional sketches provides another "Roman History", which was written by Cassius Dio.

== Southern Italy at the end of the Hannibalic War ==
By 204 BC, the Romans were clearly winning the war. Three years earlier, they had destroyed the army of Hasdrubal Barca, who had marched from Iberia through the Alps into Italy to help his brother Hannibal. Publius Cornelius Scipio had taken advantage of Hasdrubal's departure and broke the Carthaginian power on the Iberian peninsula as a result of the battle at Ilipa. The final victory was just a matter of time.

Following the battle of the Metaurus River, Hannibal decided to concentrate all his remaining forces and supporters in Bruttium, "the remotest corner of Italy". He relinquished his other possessions in Lucania and Magna Graecia apparently because they lost their strategical importance and he deemed them indefensible against Rome's superior forces. Furthermore, having lost many troops in cities taken by the Romans in the previous years, he wanted to diminish his losses. A mainly mountainous region almost entirely surrounded by the sea, Bruttium provided Hannibal with a perfect base to check the Roman advance and force the Senate to keep a large standing army against him. Thus he resorted to the same tactics his father Hamilcar Barca used for seven years during the First Punic War in Sicily. According to the military historian Hans Delbrück, the strategic goal behind these tactics was to induce Rome to an acceptable peace treaty in return for relinquishing the Punic base in Italy.

Livy describes the character of the ensuing warfare in this way: "The struggle in Bruttium had assumed the character of brigandage much more than that of regular warfare. The Numidians had commenced the practice, and the Bruttians followed their example, not so much because of their alliance with the Carthaginians as because it was their traditional and natural method of carrying on war. At last, even the Romans were infected by the passion for plunder and, as far as their generals allowed them, used to make predatory incursions on the enemy's fields."

At this point, Rome had to decide how to proceed. After much debating in the Senate, Scipio, elected consul for 205 BC, was authorized to invade Africa. Scipio's point was that only by this invasion would he induce Carthage to recall Hannibal and Mago, who had set up another Carthaginian stronghold in Italy by landing in Liguria. He was not given sufficient resources though and had to spend a year in preparations for the expedition from Sicily.

== Campaign in Bruttium ==
With time, Scipio's assessment proved correct. For four years the main Roman forces were entangled in Bruttium and some were diverted to Etruria and Cisalpine Gaul to face Mago. In 206 BC, Bruttium was assigned to both of the consuls. Cassius Dio explains their inaction: "Hannibal for a time was keeping quiet, satisfied if he might only retain such advantages as were already his. And the consuls, believing that his power would waste away even without a battle, also waited." Appian states that Hannibal was awaiting help from Carthage. This did not come, for a large convoy of 100 ships with soldiers, money, and supplies was driven off its course by high winds, intercepted and routed by the Roman fleet at Sardinia. Hannibal had to raise heavy taxes and collect more resources by confiscations. These measures undermined his popularity among the local population and were the cause for several cases of defection. The deportation of unreliable citizens from strategic fortresses, referred by Appian, produced more security for Hannibal but not in the case of Locri. In 205 BC, a Roman detachment, sent from Rhegium by Scipio, managed to capture a part of the town by a sudden assault. Hannibal moved quickly to expel the enemy "and the Romans would not have held out had not the population, embittered by the tyranny and rapacity of the Carthaginians, taken their side."

Pressed by the loss of the strategic port, Hannibal set his base "at Croton, which he found to be well situated for his operations and where he established his magazines and his headquarters against the other towns". As in the previous year, he was confronted by two armies of two legions each, one commanded by the consul Publius Licinius Crassus, the other by the proconsul Q. Caecilius. According to Appian, Crassus managed to detach from Hannibal seven towns in Bruttium, Consentia among them. It is open to debate whether he did this by force or persuasion. It is also debatable whether Crassus accomplished anything, for Livy narrates that Consentia surrendered after the battles at Croton in the following year. For Livy, the most memorable event in Bruttium in 205 BC was a pestilence that "attacked the Romans and the Carthaginians and was equally fatal to both, but in addition to the epidemic, the Carthaginians were suffering from scarcity of food". This occurred toward the year's end. The disease was so serious that Crassus could not return to Rome for conducting the elections of the next consuls and recommended to the Senate to disband one of the armies in Bruttium, so as to preserve the soldiers’ lives. The Senate let Crassus do what he deemed right and Publius Sempronius Tuditanus, who was sent the next year to Bruttium as a new consul had to enroll fresh troops.

The first battle in the vicinity of Croton took place in the summer of 204 BC. In Livy's words, it was an irregular battle that was started by an accidental clash between the marching columns of Hannibal and Sempronius. The Carthaginians repulsed their enemies, who retreated in confusion to their camp leaving 1,200 dead. Hannibal was not prepared to storm the fortified camp, so the Romans were not entirely routed. Nevertheless, Sempronius received a severe blow and judged that his two legions were no match to the Carthaginians. He abandoned the camp under the cover of the following night and summoned the proconsul P. Licinius Crassus.

After uniting with the other Roman commander in the region, Sempronius returned to Croton looking for revenge. He arranged his legions in front, leaving those of Crassus in reserve. This time, Hannibal could not stand his ground against an army doubled in size and was forced to retreat to Croton at the cost of 4,000 dead and 300 prisoners, if one believes Livy. It is not clear whether the Romans made an attempt to take Croton itself. Our authority states that Sempronius turned his attention elsewhere. The same summer he took by storm Clampetia. "Consentia, Pandosia and some other unimportant places surrendered voluntarily."

The fighting around Croton continued in 203 BC, but as Livy puts it himself, there are no clear accounts of the events. Livy is particularly suspicious of a story that the consul Cnaeus Servilius Caepio killed 5,000 Carthaginian soldiers in a pitched battle. One thing is sure – Servilius could not prevent Hannibal from departing safely to Africa. Appian informs that, for the transportation of his veterans, Hannibal even built more ships in addition to the fleet that arrived in Croton from Carthage. This was unimpeded by the Romans.

== Aftermath ==
As Scipio had predicted, despite all Hannibal's efforts, the struggle between Rome and Carthage was decided out of Italy. The Roman general inflicted several heavy defeats on the Carthaginians in Africa and they appealed for help. Whilst Hannibal was still in Bruttium, his brother Mago was repulsed and mortally wounded in a battle in Northern Italy. The remainder of Mago's forces returned to Carthage and joined Hannibal to stand against Scipio at Zama.
