= Battle of Insubria =

Battle in the Second Punic War

- Part of the Second Punic War
- The Mediterranean in 218 BC
| Date | 203 BC |
| Location | Insubria, present-day northwestern Italy 45°28′00″N 9°10′00″E |
| Result | Roman victory |

Belligerents
| Carthage | Roman Republic |

Commanders and leaders
| Mago Barca (WIA) | Publius Quintilius Varus; Marcus Cornelius Cethegus |

Strength
| 21,000 troops, 7 elephants, 25 warships | Four legions plus allies (approximately 35,000) |

Casualties and losses
| 5,000 killed Mago severely wounded 22 ensigns captured [Livy XXX/XVIII] | 2,300+ killed 3 tribunes killed [Livy XXX/XVIII] |
- Location within Italy Battle of Insubria (Mediterranean)

The Battle of Insubria in 203 BC was the culmination of a major war, carried out by the Carthaginian commander Mago, brother of Hannibal Barca, at the end of the Second Punic War between Rome and Carthage in what is now northwestern Italy. Mago had landed at Genoa, Liguria, two years before, in an effort to keep the Romans busy to the North and thus hamper indirectly their plans to invade Carthage's hinterland in Africa (modern Tunisia). He was quite successful in reigniting the unrest among various peoples (Ligurians, Gauls, Etruscans) against the Roman dominance. Rome was forced to concentrate large forces against him which finally resulted in a battle fought in the land of the Insubres (Lombardy). Mago suffered defeat and had to retreat. The strategy to divert the enemy's forces failed as the Roman general Publius Cornelius Scipio laid waste to Africa and wiped out the Carthaginian armies that were sent to destroy the invader. To counter Scipio, the Carthaginian government recalled Mago from Italy (along with his brother Hannibal, who had been in Bruttium until then). However, the remnants of the Carthaginian forces in Cisalpine Gaul continued to harass the Romans for several years after the end of the war.

== Preceding events ==
After the disastrous battle of Ilipa, Mago remained for some time in Gades, the last Punic base in Iberia. His hopes of regaining the province were definitely dashed when Scipio suppressed the resistance of the Iberians and the mutiny among the Roman troops. Then an order came from Carthage. It instructed Mago to abandon Iberia and go by sea to northern Italy with the objective to reinvigorate the war there in coordination with Hannibal who was in the south.

This undertaking was a last try of the Carthaginians to regain the initiative in the war, which had come to a very dangerous phase for them. With the reconquest of Sicily in 211/210 BC, the destruction of Hasdrubal Barca’s army on the Metaurus River (207 BC) and now with the conquest of Iberia (206 BC), the Romans were not only relieved from immediate pressure but were gaining more and more resources to continue the fight. For the first time since the beginning of the war Carthage was left directly vulnerable to attack, which it could not prevent because of the naval supremacy of Rome.

Along with the instructions, Mago received some money for mercenaries, but not enough to raise a stronger army. So he was forced to requisition not only the public treasury of Gades, but also the wealth from its temples. Search for additional resources was the apparent reason for an unsuccessful naval assault on Carthago Nova. Returning from there, Mago found the gates of Gades closed for him. He sailed to the Balearic Islands and settled for the winter in the smaller one, Minorca.

== Mago's expedition ==
In the summer of 205 BC, a Carthaginian fleet emerged suddenly at the Ligurian coast. With about 30 warships and many transport vessels, Mago had brought a 14,000 strong army. He took Genua by surprise and then moved to the land of the Ingauni, forming an alliance with them against another Ligurian tribe, the Epanterii.

Liguria and Cisalpine Gaul presented a very suitable ground for Mago's operations. Despite the victorious campaigns in the Po valley before the outbreak of the Second Punic war and the extensive colonization, Rome did not entirely manage to subjugate the local Gauls. Led by the Insubres and Boii, they rose to arms once again just before the invasion of Hannibal (218 BC) and joined the latter's army by the thousands. The same happened on the arrival of Hasdrubal from Iberia in 207 BC and there was no exception in 205 BC, when the younger brother of Hannibal came. "His (Mago's) army grew in numbers every day; the Gauls, drawn by the spell of his name, flocked to him from all parts." Hearing such news, the senators in Rome were filled with "gravest apprehensions". They immediately sent two armies to Ariminum (modern Rimini) and Arretium (modern Arezzo) in order to block an eventual advance of Mago to the south.

It looked as if the Romans were going to pay for their failure to capitalize from the victory at the Metaurus River by conquering the Cisalpine Gauls once and for all, but the danger caused by Mago's landing was not to be overestimated. Even when he received reinforcements from Carthage in the form of about 7,000 troops, 7 elephants, and 25 warships, his strength was still far from enough to break the Roman defences. This is why Mago did not seem to actively pursue the goal set by Carthage – to march south and join Hannibal.

This call was spurred by the raids of C. Laelius, a legate of Scipio, on the African mainland, plundering the environs of Hippo Regius during the same summer (205 BC). Faced with the impending invasion of Scipio himself, the Carthaginians took all efforts to prevent it. To secure their rear, they consolidated their network of alliances with the Numidians. To keep the Romans in check, soldiers and supplies were sent to Hannibal in Bruttium and Mago, and an embassy to Philip V of Macedon with the mission to negotiate a Macedonian invasion of either Italy or Sicily. All these measures had little effect, because Philip had just concluded the peace of Phoenice with P. Sempronius Tuditanus, a Roman general, thereby bringing the First Macedonian War to an end, and the Carthaginian alliance with the most powerful Numidian king Syphax did not stop Scipio from sailing to Africa in 204 BC. Without sufficient help from outside, Hannibal and Mago were unable to exert greater pressure on Rome. The two brothers were separated by a vast space and the overwhelming Roman armies.

Mago had to accomplish the same task in which his other brother, Hasdrubal, had failed two years ago. Bearing in mind Hasdrubal's fate, he knew that an eventual offensive against the concentrating Roman forces had to be well-prepared. So he organized a meeting of Gallic and Ligurian chieftains and assured them that his mission was to liberate them, but for that he needed many more soldiers. The Ligurians committed themselves immediately, but the Gauls, threatened by the Roman armies on the borders and inside their homeland, declined to revolt openly. Nevertheless, they secretly provided supplies and mercenaries and his strength grew gradually.

In the meantime, the proconsul M. Livius moved from Etruria into Cisalpine Gaul and joined forces with the Roman commander there, Sp. Lucretius, blocking Mago's way to Rome. However, Livius remained on the defensive. Nothing changed dramatically in the following year (204 BC). Mago remained inactive for the said reasons, the Romans – because of the physical and moral exhaustion from the long war. They were preoccupied with problems such as forcing the Latin colonies, which had refused to provide any more money and soldiers several years before, to do their duty. This facilitated the recruitment of new troops. One of the new consuls, P. Sempronius Tuditanus, was sent against Hannibal in Bruttium. The other, M. Cornelius Cethegus, had to stay in Etruria and sever the conspiracy that Mago had formed with a number of rebellious Etrurian towns.

== Battle in Insubria ==
In 203 BC, the time came for decisive action. The proconsul M. Cornelius Cethegus and the praetor P. Quintilius Varus led an army of four legions against Mago in a regular battle in the Insubrian land (not far from modern Milan). The description by Livy in his "History of Rome" (Ab urbe condita) shows that each of the opponents deployed their forces in two battle lines. Of the Roman army, two legions were in the front, the other two and the cavalry were left behind. Mago also took care for a possible reverse, keeping in the rear the Gallic levy and the few elephants he had. Some modern estimates put his overall strength at more than 30,000.

The course of the battle showed that the first Carthaginian line performed better and the Gauls were less reliable. From the onset, the Romans made futile attempts to break the enemy's resistance and were pressed hard themselves. Then Varus moved the cavalry (3,000 or 4,000 horsemen), hoping to repulse and confuse the Carthaginian lines. However, Mago was not surprised and moved forward the elephants just in time. The horses were stricken by fear and as a result the Roman cavalry was dispersed, chased by Mago's light Numidian cavalry. The elephants turned on the Roman infantry, which suffered heavy losses. The battle only took a bad turn for Mago when Cornelius brought into action the legions of the second line. The elephants were showered upon by darts, with most of them falling, the rest were forced to turn back against their own ranks. Mago ordered the Gauls to stop the Roman counter-attack, but they were routed.

According to Livy, all ended with a general retreating of the Carthaginians, who lost up to 5,000 men. Yet, as Livy himself states, the Romans owed their success to the wounding of the Carthaginian commander, who had to be carried away almost fainting from the field because his thigh was pierced. The victory was neither bloodless, nor complete. The first Roman line lost 2,300 men, and the second also took casualties, among them three military tribunes. The cavalry was not spared either, and many noble Equites were trampled to death by the elephants. During the night Mago withdrew his forces to the Ligurian coast, conceding the battlefield to the Romans.

== Assessment ==
For Mago the setback was severe, considering what gains a victory would have brought. (In 218 BC, the victory in the battle of Trebia, in which Mago also distinguished himself, was followed by a general uprising of the Cisalpine Gauls, who joined Hannibal and made possible his march to the south.) The Romans were left in command of the Po Valley and all hopes for a repetition of the events from the beginning of the war faded. This was significant in view of the ongoing Roman advance in Africa. Scipio’s victories at Utica and the Great Plains and Mago's failure in Cisalpine Gaul meant not only that Scipio could remain in Africa, but that Mago had to return to save his homeland. Messengers from Carthage reached Mago in the land of the Ingauni, and he set sail for Africa with a part of his army.

Some sources claim that Mago died during this voyage from the wound that he suffered in the battle, but others state that he returned to Liguria soon after his departure and stayed there for at least two more years. It is certain that for five years after the end of the Second Punic War the Romans had to fight the remnants of the Carthaginian forces in Northern Italy. Mago's defeat in 203 BC had marked one of the last attempts to preserve the independence of this region from the Roman advance.

== Basic literature and external links ==
In English:

- Works related to From the Founding of the City (1905) by Livy, (transl. Canon Roberts) at Wikisource.
- Livy, The History of Rome, Vol. IV (ed. E. Rhys, transl. C. Roberts), available at University of Virginia Library Electronic Text Center, retrieved on 2007-10-3
- Cassius Dio, Roman History, on Bill Thayer's Web Site, LacusCurtius, retrieved on 2007-10-9
- Appian, Roman History, The Punic Wars, retrieved from "Livius Articles on Ancient History" on 2007-10-9
- Mommsen, Theodor, The History of Rome, Book III, The Gutenberg Project eBook, retrieved on 2007-09-30 (in German)
- Caven, Brian, The Punic Wars, Weidenfeld and Nicolson, London 1980, ISBN 0-297-77633-9
- Smith, William (ed.), Dictionary of Greek and Roman Biography and Mythology, made available by the University of Michigan, retrieved on 2007-10-3

In Russian:

- Тит Ливий, История Рима от основания города
- Кораблев, И.Ш., Ганнибал, Москва, "Наука", 1976, с. 284, 289-290, на сайте Студенческого научного общества
