= Economy of Hispania =

The economy of Hispania, or Roman Iberia, experienced a strong revolution during and after the conquest of the peninsular territory by Rome, in such a way that, from an unknown but promising land, it came to be one of the most valuable acquisitions of both the Republic and Empire and a basic pillar that sustained the rise of Rome.

== The Pre-Roman economy ==
Before the entrance of Rome into Iberia, almost all of the peninsula was based on a rural subsistence economy with little or very limited trade, with the exception of the largest cities, located mainly on the Mediterranean coast, which had regular contact with Greek and Phoenician commerce.

=== The economic strategy of the Roman conquest ===
Phoenician legends had traditionally circulated throughout the Mediterranean about the infinite riches of the Tartessos and how commercial expeditions returned from the coast of Hispania loaded with cargoes of silver. Undoubtedly, these stories contributed to the increase in interest of the Mediterranean powers in the Iberian peninsula.

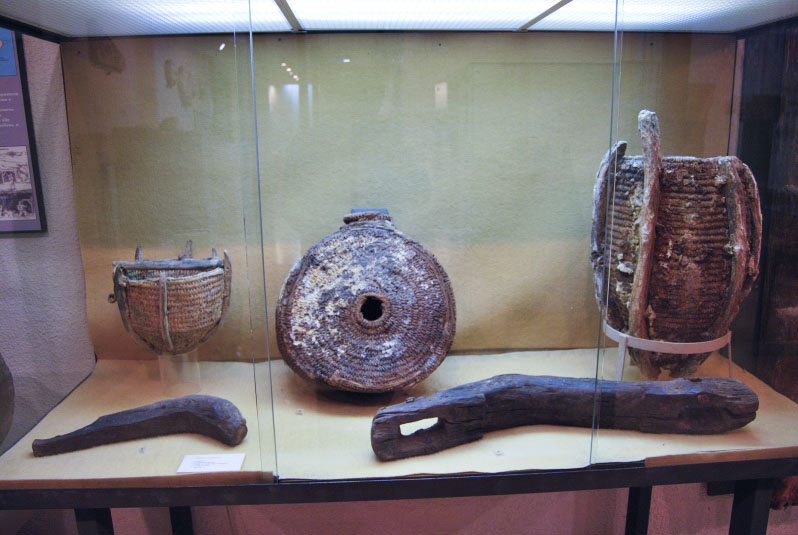
Mining tools from the mines of New Carthage. Municipal Archaeological Museum of Cartagena

After their defeat in the First Punic War, Carthage was overwhelmed by the loss of important markets and by the tribute it had to pay Rome as compensation for the war. With the goal of alleviating this situation, the Carthagenians decided to expand along the coast of Iberia, which had until then been outside the area of Roman influence. Carthage, interested above all in getting quick profit, exploited the silver mines along the coastline of Andalusia and Levante, extracting large amounts of this metal with which it financed a great part of the Second Punic War and Hannibal's Italian campaign.

With this purpose and others, one of the first strategic objectives of Rome when invading the peninsula was to take the mines near New Carthage. In part due to the loss of these resources, and in greater part due to the isolation he found himself in, Hannibal had to renounce the war in Italy in 206 BC.

After the expulsion of Carthage, part of the indigenous peoples of Hispania were forced to pay tribute to Rome through an intricate web of alliances and allegiances. Despite this, throughout the 2nd and 1st centuries BC, Rome took the unconquered lands of Hispania as an opportunity to pillage and plunder, frequently breaking peace treaties, like the accords from the times of Graccus Sempronius, which had allowed long periods of peace. The uprising of the Celtiberian and Lusitanian peoples only served to increase revenues from Rome via the immense spoils of war from the campaigns of Cato the Elder.

This policy of obtaining riches by force had its continuation in the campaigns of Pompey and later Julius Caesar, whom the histories say undertook not only to fight Pompey, but to profit from the conquest in order pay his creditors.

Meanwhile, the Spanish Mediterranean coast, which had been conquered during the war against Carthage and rapidly Romanized, began its economic and commercial expansion that would soon make it famous in the Roman world.

== The economy of Romanized Hispania ==
Besides the exploitation of mineral resources, Rome obtained with the conquest of Hispania access to what were probably the best agricultural lands in all of Romanized territory. Therefore, it became necessary to use those lands as soon as possible. During the Roman domination of the area, the economy of Hispania experienced a major production expansion, fueled further by roads and trade routes that opened the markets of the rest of the Empire.

=== Circulating currency ===
One of the most obvious symbols of civilization that foreign cultures brought to Hispania was the minting of coins to facilitate commercial transactions. Beforehand, the peninsular economy was based on the barter system, exchanging products rather than currency, but beginning in the 3rd century BC, Greek colonies like Ampurias began minting coins, but with no influence beyond its boundaries.

Later, Carthage would introduce a more general use of the coins as payment for its troops, before and during the Roman invasion; but it would be the Romans who would impose the use of currency throughout the Spanish territory, and not just that currency whose value was based on the metal contained in the coin, but others of lower value than the alloy that comprised them, and were endorsed by the Roman treasury. From the abundance of coins found, especially those of lower value, one can draw the conclusion that the money was used widely in everyday life. During expansion of Rome in Spain, many peoples of the Peninsula minted their own coins in order to facilitate payment of tribute and trade with the area under Roman rule.

Throughout the Republican period, it was the Roman Senate that completely controlled the issuance of coinage through the monetary courts, but later, with the rise of the dictators, its control was reduced to lower valued coins, later passing many of the mints to imperial control.

Once Roman power in Hispania was consolidated, there were many mints that coined money, such as Tarraco (the first of the Roman mints in Hispania), Italica, Barcino, Caesaraugusta, Emerita Augusta, etc. And throughout the Empire, more than 400 mints provided coinage to most of Europe, North Africa and the Middle East.

=== Minerals ===
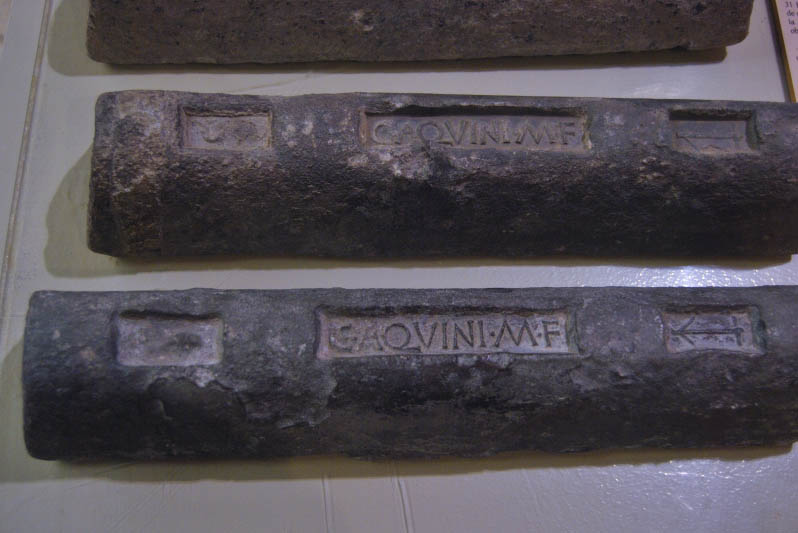
Bars of lead from the mines of New Carthage. Municipal Archaeological Museum of Cartagena

Undoubtedly, the first interest of Rome in Iberia was to take advantage of its legendary mineral wealth, besides that taken from Carthage. After the Second Punic War, the administration of was entrusted to Publius Scipio 'Africanus', who paid special attention to the mines. Rome would continue the extraction practices that the Iberian peoples began and that the Carthaginians would improve by importing the techniques used in Ptolemaic Egypt.

Since the mines were state owned, Rome created companies, 'public societies', which were public businesses administrated by publicans for mining. These publicans, generally members of the equestrian order, enriched themselves rapidly and abundantly, but Sulla snatched the mines from the publicans during his dictatorship in the 80s and 70s BC, putting them in the hands of private individuals and obtaining with it great economic and political benefits. In the times of Strabo (1st century BC - 1st century AD, during the transition from the Republic to the dictators and the Empire), they were granted as concessions to private exploitation. This system permitted the rapid enriching of certain families who, coming from Italy, had settled in Hispania for this purpose. In other cases, the mines could belong to a city (generally to a colony). The profits from the mines were huge and remained so throughout the period of seven centuries of Roman rule, which converted Hispania into an economic mainstay of the Empire. The records show with sufficient accuracy mine production figures, that in the 2nd century BC were more than nine million denarii annually, while the spoils of war during the same period, were never more than a little more than a third of this amount.

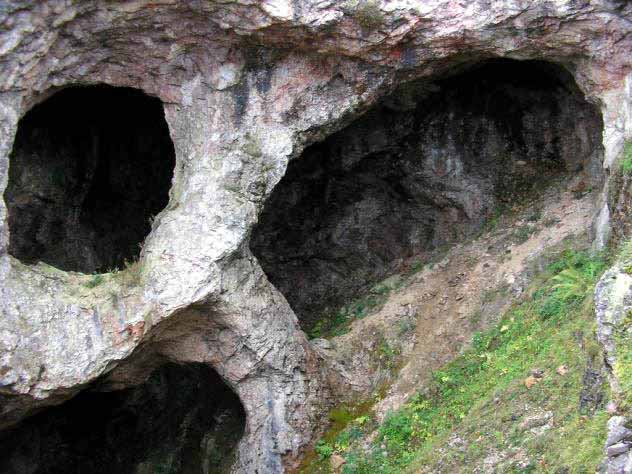
Entrances to a copper mine in Texeo (Principado de Asturias) mined in Roman times.

With regards to minerals, Rome extracted with greater interest silver, copper, and iron. Hannibal had given a great vitality to the silver mines of New Carthage. In those on the outskirts of Cartagena and Mazarron, Rome continued extracting silver, lead, iron, zinc, and other minerals in great quantities, making about 40,000 slaves labor in them. Even today in the region of Ilipa (the same place where Scipio inflicted a major defeat on the Carthaginians on the west bank of the river Betis) there are significant mineral deposits such as Almaden de la Plata or Aznalcollar in Sevilla, and the Almaden mercury that depended on Sisapo (Valle de Alcudia, Ciudad Real). This production, besides the remains of the same mineral deposits, is demonstrated by the many underwater wrecks in which silver ingots have been found, and lead and copper bars with the seals of Hispanic smelters.

Another important mineral extracted in Hispania was lapis specularis, a type of translucent gypsum, much appreciated as a mineral for the making, as crystal, windows in Rome. Its principal areas of extraction were the current Spanish provinces of Toledo and Cuenca. The city of Segobriga was the administrative center of the mineral's production, and it was the principle economic activity of the city.

Beyond all of this, the work in the mines in the times of Roman Hispania took place under unsafe conditions. Millions of slaves were employed in mines in extremely dangerous work without any security and without a schedule that is humane.. Slaves would then spend the rest of their life, hauling minerals and stone all day or swinging a pick in the galleries, always at risk of cave ins.

=== Agriculture ===
As soon as the first conquests obtained them, cultivated lands were divided amongst the professional troops, the land being measured and divided for the colonization of the territory. Traditionally, farming had been idealized by Roman culture as the culmination of the aspirations of the citizen. The Romans pushed legislation on land ownership, guaranteeing property lines through surveying techniques and the "centuriazation" of the fields. This policy would allow a rapid colonization of the land. Subsequently, late in the 2nd century BC, this would produce a crisis for the peasantry throughout the territory under Roman rule, caused by the huge quantity of slaves who were employed in all sectors, with a consequent decline in the competitiveness of small farmers. The crisis, despite the failed agrarian reform attempts of the Tribunes Tiberius and Cayo Sempronio Graco, would favor the strengthening of the great landowners, possessors of large expanses of land dedicated to cultivation of a single crop and worked by slaves. The small farmer in many cases would be doomed to abandon his lands and swell the ranks of the growing number of Roman armies.

==== Olives and commerce in oil ====
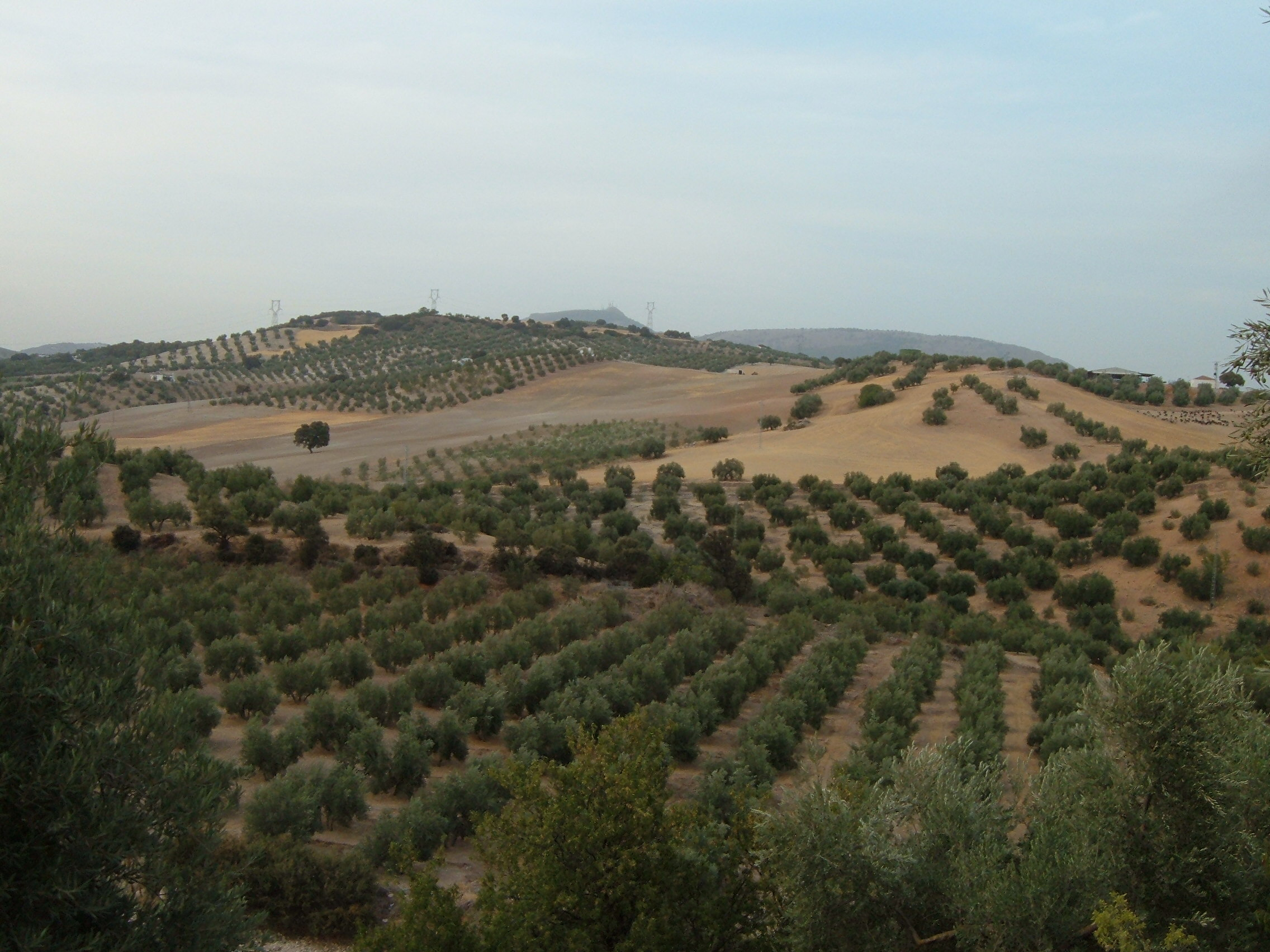
Olives in the province of Granada.

Of the agricultural production of Hispania since the 2nd century BC, the cultivation of olives, especially along the Mediterranean coast and Betic Tarragona, stands out. Under the Romans, the province of Bética specialized in the production of olive oil for export to Rome and northern Europe.

The deposits of amphorae from "Mount Testaccio" as much as underwater deposits are evidence of trade with Rome. Mount Testaccio originated as a dumping ground for ceramic packaging of goods that arrived in Rome. From the size that the hill attained, which according to research, 80% of its volume is composed of Betician amphorae for olive oil, one can deduce the magnitude of the trade generated by the oil and hence the importance that olive cultivation had in Hispania. This was undoubtedly the product of Hispania which was marketed in more abundance and for a longer period of time, and indeed is still the foundation of agriculture in southern Iberia.

Amphorae of Betic origin has been found, besides in Mount Testaccio (since most of the oil production was sent to Rome until the middle of the 3rd century AD), in locations as diverse as Alexandria, and even Israel. During the 2nd century AD, shipments of oil were destined for the Roman garrisons of Germania.

Within the oil trade, the quantity of amphorae found, as much in Mount Testaccio as in other places, stands out. The Sevillian town of Lora del Rio, where one of largest exporters of this product was located, is studied today in the archeological remains of La Catria. However through the history of Roman Hispania, a multitude of potteries and producers of oil existed in Betica itself as much as in the area to the east of it.

==== Cultivation of grapevines and commerce in wine ====
With respect to grapevine cultivation, classical sources discuss the quality and quantity of Hispanic stock, some of them highly appreciated in Italy, while the production of others less selective were destined to be consumed by the greater public who had less purchasing power. This crop was produced mostly in the 'fundus' (latifundias), that understood all the processes needed to make wine, occasionally including the manufacture of the pottery needed for the manufacture of the bottle. Because of the number of said 'fundus' and the total production of the same, it was possible to keep the domestic market supplied and to export the considerable excess for consumption of other parts of the Empire.

==== Treatises of Columella ====
Inside the chronicles and treatises concerning agriculture in Hispania, the work of Cadizian Lucius Junius Moderatus Columella is remarkable. In his dozen books, he presented the characteristics of agriculture in his time (1st century AD), criticizing those defects that, in his understanding, ruined the industry, like the abandoning of the fields and the hoarding of land by the great landholders. In these books, he deals extensively with the cultivation of olives and grapevines.

==== Trade in salted goods ====
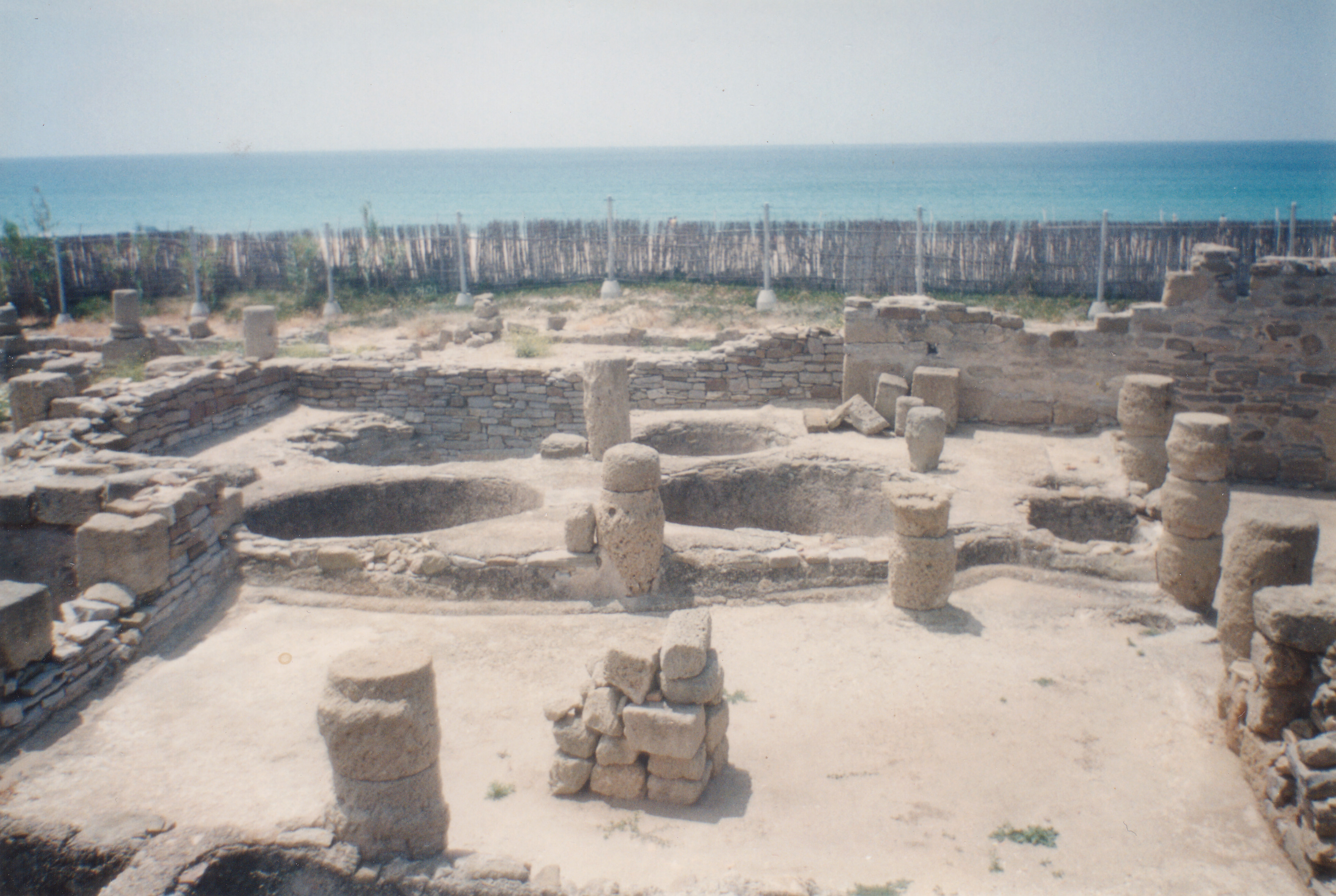
Ruins of a factory for salted fish and garum, located in the ancient Roman city of Baelo Claudia, near Tarifa in southern Spain.

Thanks to archeological research about the production of amphorae in the southern peninsula, it can be deduced that the commerce of salted fish existed before the control of Carthage. Evidence exists for production and marketing of salted fish as early as the 5th century BC. The Carthaginians extended this trade throughout all of the western Mediterranean, as much Hispanic as North African.

Throughout the Roman period, Hispania stood out for its continuation of the flourishing trade of salted fish from Betica, extending its market throughout western Europe. This activity is reflected in the remains of factories whose product was, in addition to salted fish, the sauce garum, whose fame was extended throughout the Empire. Garum sauce was produced by the process of maceration of fish viscera. As with the wine and oil trade, the production of garum generated an important auxiliary industry of packaging in amphorae, in which were conserved abundant remains, and thanks to which, it is possible to determine the reach of this trade.

== See also ==
- Roman economy
- Roman conquest of the Iberian Peninsula
- Romanization of Hispania

== Bibliography ==
The Miguel de Cervantes Virtual Library

- Los Celtíberos - Alberto J. Lorrio (Universidad de Alicante)
- Las relaciones entre Hispania y el norte de África durante el gobierno bárquida y la conquista romana (237-19 a. J.C.) - José María Blázquez Martínez
- El impacto de la conquista de Hispania en Roma (154-83 a. C.) - José María Blázquez Martínez
- Veinticinco años de estudios sobre la ciudad hispano-romana - Juan Manuel Abascal Palazón (Universidad de Alicante)
- Segobriga y la religión en la Meseta sur durante el Principado - Juan Manuel Abascal Palazón (Universidad de Alicante)
- Notas a la contribución de la Península Ibérica al erario de la República romana - José María Blázquez Martínez
- Prácticas ilegítimas contra las propiedades rústicas en época romana (II): "Immitere in alienum, furtum, damnum iniuria datum" - M.ª Carmen Santapau Pastor
- La exportación del aceite hispano en el Imperio romano: estado de la cuestión - José María Blázquez Martínez
- Administración de las minas en época romana. Su evolución - José María Blázquez Martínez
- Fuentes literarias griegas y romanas referentes a las explotaciones mineras de la Hispania romana - José María Blázquez Martínez
- Panorama general de la escultura romana en Cataluña - José María Blázquez Martínez
- Destrucción de los mosaicos mitológicos por los cristianos - José María Blázquez Martínez

Other on-line publications

- Revista Lucentum, XIX-XX, 2000-2001 (formato PDF) - Las magistraturas locales en las ciudades romanas del área septentrional del Conventus Carthaginensis, por Julián Hurtado Aguña - ISSN 0213-2338
- El uso de la moneda en las ciudades romanas de Hispania en época imperial: el área mediterránea (PDF). Universitat de Valencia - Servei de publicacions. Nuria Lledó Cardona - ISBN 84-370-5470-2
- Morfología històrica del territorium de Tarraco en època tardo-republicana romana o ibèrica final (catalán). Tesis doctoral, Universitat Autònoma de Barcelona. Isaías Arrayás Morales (páginas 200 en adelante) - ISBN 84-688-1008-8
- Las constituciones imperiales de Hispania (PDF). Archivo CEIPAC. Fernando Martín
- Producción artesanal, viticultura y propiedad rural en la Hispania Tarraconense (PDF). Archivos CEIPAC. Victor Revilla Calvo (Dept. Prehistoria, Historia Antigua y Arqueología. Universidad de Barcelona)
- Explotación del salazón en la Bahía de Cádiz en la Antigüedad: Aportación al conocimiento de su evolución a través de la producción de las ánforas Mañá C. (PDF). Archivos CEIPAC. Lázaro Lagóstena Barrios (Universidad de Cádiz)
- La agricultura como «officium» en el mundo romano (PDF). Archivos de la Universidad de Lieja (Bélgica). Rosalía Rodríguez López (Universidad de Almería)
- Observaciones sobre el depósito de la cosa debida en caso de «mora creditoris» (PDF). Archivos de la Universidad de Lieja (Bélgica). Elena Quintana Orive (Universidad Autónoma de Madrid)

Printed works

- España y los españoles hace dos mil años (según la Geografía de Estrabón) de Antonio Gª y Bellido. Colección Austral de Espasa Calpe S.A., Madrid 1945. ISBN 84-239-7203-8
- Las artes y los pueblos de la España primitiva de José Camón Aznar (catedrático de la Universidad de Madrid. Editorial Espasa-Calpe. Madrid, 1954
- El trabajo en la Hispania Romana. VVAA. Ed. Sílex, 1999.
- Diccionario de los Íberos. Pellón Olagorta, Ramón. Espasa Calpe S.A. Madrid 2001. ISBN 84-239-2290-1
- Geografía histórica española de Amando Melón. Editorial Volvntad, S.A., Tomo primero, Vol. I-Serie E. Madrid 1928
- Historia de España y de la civilización española. Rafael Altamira y Crevea. Tomo I. Barcelona, 1900. ISBN 84-8432-245-9
- Historia ilustrada de España. Antonio Urbieto Arteta. Volumen II. Editorial Debate, Madrid 1994. ISBN 84-8306-008-6
- Historia de España. España romana, I. Bosch Gimpera, Aguado Bleye, José Ferrandis. Obra dirigida por Ramón Menéndez Pidal. Editorial Espasa-Calpe S.A., Madrid 1935
- Arte Hispalense, nº21: Pinturas romanas en Sevilla. Abad Casal, Lorenzo. Publicaciones de la Exma. Diputación Provincial de Sevilla. ISBN 84-500-3309-8
- El mosaico romano en Hispania : crónica ilustrada de una sociedad. Tarrats Bou, F. Alfafar : Global Edition - Contents, S.A. ISBN 978-84-933702-1-3. Libro declarado «de interés turístico nacional», (enlace a BOE nº 44, 21 February 2005, PDF)
