= Ilipa =

Coordinates: 37°31′06″N 5°58′42″W

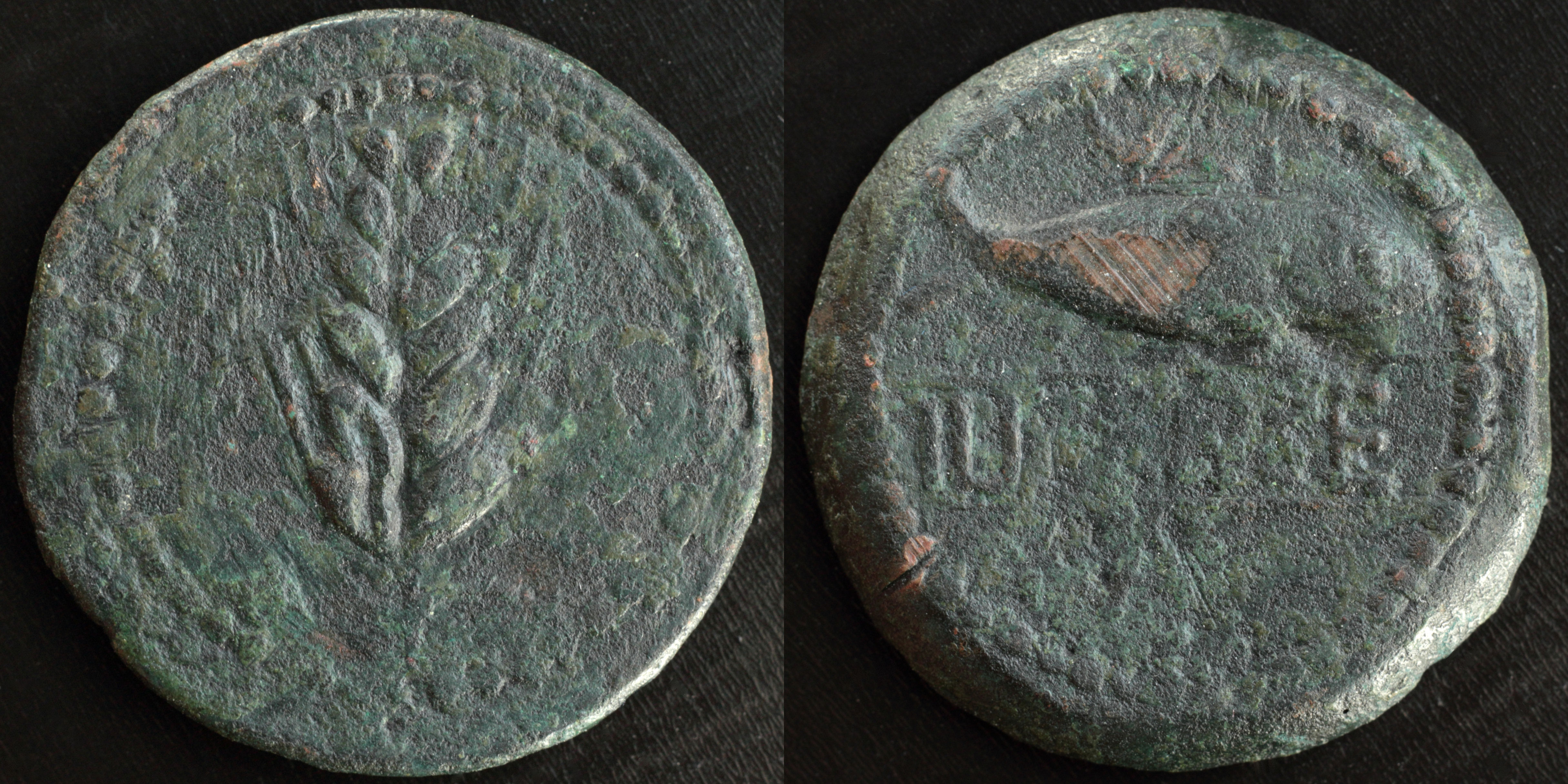
O: grain ear R: crescent above fish, ILIPENSE This coin was struck in Ilipa circa 150-100 BC.

Ilipa (Ancient Greek: Ἴλιπα) or Ilipa Magna was an ancient Iberian city located on the right bank of the River Betis (now known as the Guadalquivir) within one of its meanders. It later became part of the province of Hispania Ulterior and the legal district of Hispalis. Today, its remains can be found in the municipality of Alcalá del Río, in the province of Seville, Spain.

Located in the territory of the Turdetani, the city, due to its strategic position and fortified by large walls, controlled the land and river routes that connected with the silver mines of Sierra Morena. Due to its fertile agriculture, it held a significant position in the region. The city was supplied with potable water by an aqueduct that spanned approximately 17 km from the Sierra Norte of Seville. No remains of this aqueduct exist today. Its significance and magnitude earned it the name "Magna," which means "the Great."

== Second Punic War ==
During the Second Punic War between the Romans and the Carthaginians, Scipio Africanus confronted General Mago Barca in 206 BC. Mago was one of the sons of Hamilcar Barca and the brother of Hannibal. The confrontation, known as the Battle of Ilipa, took place near the Cortijo del Vado de las Estacas, which is in close proximity to the city. With this significant Roman victory at the Battle of Ilipa, the de facto end of Carthaginian supremacy in the Iberian Peninsula was sealed.

Following the Battle of Ilipa, Scipio Africanus established the city of Italica as a settlement for war veterans and those who were maimed in the conflict.

During the era of the Visigoths, the location was referenced as an ecclesiastical diocese.

In addition to remnants of the Roman wall and other archaeological artifacts housed in the Archaeological Museum of Seville, Roman mosaics from the 3rd century were discovered in 2013. These mosaics once paved a domus, a type of private family residence in ancient Rome.

== Bibliography ==
- Strabo 3, p. 142; Corpus Inscriptionum Latinarum 2, 1085.
- Velasco Muñoz, Julio (January 2007), Instituto de Estudios Ilipenses (ed.), "Ilipa Antiqua. De la prehistoria a la época romana. Sobre el acueducto de Ilipa (2007)", Ilipa Antiqua. De la prehistoria a la época romana (in Spanish)
- Ptolemy. Geographia. 2, 4, 10.
- Velasco Muñoz, Julio (January 2020), ""Al vado, que dizen de las Estacas..." El Vado de las Estacas, construcción de un relato histórico (2020)", La Espadaña (in Spanish)
- Polybius. The Histories. 11, 20.
- Livy. Ab urbe condita. 28, 12.
- Domínguez, Francisco J. (August 12, 2014). "La Ilipa romana renace". elcorreoweb.es.
