= Hanno the Elder =

Hanno (Punic: 𐤇𐤍𐤀, ḤNʾ) was a Carthaginian general serving under Mago Barca in the Second Punic War. He is sometimes mistaken for Hanno, son of Bomilcar.

== Biography ==
He was sent to Spain in 206 BC by the Carthaginian senate to recruit Spanish mercenaries along with Mago Barca. Despite gathering an army in Celtiberia, including the mythical Larus, they were defeated and captured by the Romans under Marcus Junius Silanus.

After reaching Gades, Mago sent a prefect similarly named Hanno, who was defeated and killed by Silanus in 206 BC in the Battle of the Guadalquivir.

== See also ==
- Other Hannos in Carthaginian history
