= Viriathus (Second Punic War) =

3rd-century BCE Carthaginian army leader

- Viriato, Viriathus
- Born: Lusitania/Gallaecia
- Died: Cannae, Italy
- Military career
- Allegiance: Carthaginian Empire
- Service years: 218-216 BC
- Conflicts: Second Punic War: Battle of Lake Trasimene; Battle of Cannae

Viriathus (supposedly died 216 BC) was a leader of Gallaecian and Lusitanian mercenaries in the Carthaginian army during the Second Punic War, according to Silius Italicus's poem Punica.

== Biography ==
Viriathus is mentioned only by Silius in his poem. He appears first in Silius's list of the Carthaginian forces, being described as the young commander of both the Gallaeci and the Lusitanians in Hannibal's army. He is then compared to the posterior, more famous Viriathus, by stating that his name "was to win fame from Roman disasters at a later day". Later in the work, he is described as a noble ruler of his peoples, who goes to battle armed with sword and caetra.

His relationship with his namesake has not been fully understood. Some believe the Carthaginian Viriathus could have been an invention by Silius in order to embellish his work, inserting by parachronism the true Viriathus in the Second Punic War despite chronological impossibilities. By this approach, attributing to him the death of a Roman from the Servilia gens in Punica could be a reference to the historical Viriathus being murdered by order of Quintus Servilius Caepio. However, others have argued that this Viriathus might have been a true historical character with the same name, given that the latter could be actually a title used by chieftains of Celtic peoples.

According to the poem, his Lusitanian forces scored a feat in the poem by taking down Roman officer Mamercus at the Battle of Lake Trasimene. Afterwards, Viriathus got his own individual participation in the Battle of Cannae. He and his contingent attacked the positions nearby to the consul Gaius Terentius Varro, where Viriathus killed the proconsul Gnaeus Servilius Geminus by capitalizing on his battle fatigue. This attracted the attention of Lucius Aemilius Paullus, Servilius's superior, who charged at the Spaniards and killed Viriathus while the latter was shouting a song of victory. However, Lucius would be immediately disabled by a slinger and later killed by surrounding Carthaginian soldiers.

== In film and television ==
In the 2016 series Barbarians Rising, the character of Cumelios (played by Clive Russell) mirrors Viriathus. He is portrayed as the leader of the Lusitanians allied to Hannibal and is similarly killed while distracted in the Battle of Cannae.

== See also ==
- Hannibal
- Larus
- Viriathus
