= Mago Barca =

Barcid Carthaginian who played an important role in the Second Punic War

- 𐤌𐤂𐤍 𐤁𐤓𐤒
- Born: 243 BC
- Died: 202/3 BC (aged 40–41)
- Relatives: Hamilcar Barca (father); Hasdrubal (brother); Hannibal (brother)
- Military career
- Allegiance: Carthage
- Rank: General
- Conflicts: Punic Wars; Second Punic War; Battle of the Trebia; Battle of Cannae; Battle of Munda; Battle of the Upper Baetis; Battle of Baecula; Battle of Ilipa; Battle of Insubria (WIA)

Mago Barca (Punic: 𐤌𐤂𐤍 𐤁𐤓𐤒, romanized: Magon Barqa; died 202 BC) was a Carthaginian, member of the Barcid family, who played an important role in the Second Punic War, leading forces of Carthage against the Roman Republic in Iberia and northern and central Italy. Mago was the third son of Hamilcar Barca, was the brother of Hannibal and Hasdrubal, and was the brother-in-law of Hasdrubal the Fair.

Little is known about his early years, except that, unlike his brothers, he is not mentioned during the ambush in which his father was killed in 228 BC.

== Name ==
The name "Mago(n)" was a common masculine given name among the Carthaginian elite. It meant "Godsent".

The cognomen or epithet brq means "thunderbolt" or "shining". It is cognate with the Arabic name Barq and the Hebrew name Barak and equivalent to the Greek Keraunos, which was borne by contemporary commanders. It had been used for Mago's father Hamilcar and is used to distinguish his three sons from others who shared their names.

== On the Italian Peninsula ==
Hannibal included Mago among the Carthaginian officers who accompanied him to the Italian Peninsula. Among them were Maharbal, Hanno the Elder, Muttines (Punic: 𐤌𐤕𐤍, mtn) and Carthalo.

Mago fought at the side of Hannibal in the invasion of Italy, and played a key role in many battles. At the Battle of the Trebia, he commanded the detachment that ambushed the Romans, breaking down their battle array. After the battle, Mago commanded the rearguard of the Carthaginian column as it marched south towards Latium through the marshes of Aino. In the Battle of Cannae, Mago and Hannibal took position with the Gallic infantry at the centre, in the most vulnerable and crucial position of the formation.

After the victory of Cannae, Hannibal sent Mago with a detachment to Bruttium (southern Italy). While marching through Lucania and Bruttium, Mago subdued several towns and brought over several to the Carthaginian side. From Bruttium, Mago sailed to Carthage, leaving Hanno the Elder in command of the Carthaginian garrison. Mago presented the golden rings of Roman equites fallen at Cannae to the Carthaginian Senate, requesting reinforcements for Hannibal at the end of his speech. This prompted the supporters of the Barcid party in the Senate to taunt their opponents, who had bitterly opposed any aid to Hannibal. In response, Hanno the Great, leading opponent of the Barcids, posed several questions to Mago, which took most of the gloss off Mago's presentation. Still, the Senate members were impressed enough to vote to send 4,000 Numidian cavalry, 40 war elephants and 500 talents to Italy, and Mago was instructed to raise an additional 20,000 infantry and 4,000 cavalry from Spain for Hannibal. Mago's army, numbering 12,000 infantry, 1,500 cavalry, 20 war elephants, with 1,000 talents, was raised slowly, perhaps due to anti-Barcid intrigues.

However, when the news of the disastrous Battle of Dertosa reached Carthage, Mago and his army were sent to Hispania (the Iberian Peninsula) as reinforcements for Hasdrubal instead. But the Carthaginian Senate did not entirely ignore the Italian front for once. The force of 4,000 Numidian cavalry and 40 war elephants was sent to Locri in Bruttium, escorted by the Punic fleet under Bomilcar. These were the only significant reinforcements Hannibal was to receive from his government.

== Iberian campaigns ==
Although Hasdrubal nominally commanded all Carthaginian forces in the Iberian Peninsula (the Roman Hispania), Mago received an independent command, a division that was to have grave consequences later. The two Barca brothers, aided by Hasdrubal Gisco, battled the Romans under the command of the Scipio brothers (Gnaeus Cornelius Scipio Calvus and Publius Cornelius Scipio) throughout 215–212 BC. Mago, in a cavalry ambush of Publius Cornelius Scipio, killed 2,000 Romans near Akra Leuke in 214 BC, and also aided in keeping the Hispanic tribes loyal to Carthage. On the whole, the Carthaginians managed to maintain the balance of power in Hispania despite the efforts of the Scipios, but failed to send any aid to Hannibal. The situation was favourable enough, as in 212 BC, Hasdrubal managed to cross over to Africa with an army to crush the rebellion of Syphax, king of the Numidian tribes, without the Scipios causing any disruptions in Hispania. Mago and Hasdrubal Gisco guarded the Carthaginian possessions in Iberia without difficulty, despite the Scipios outnumbering their armies during the absence of Hasdrubal.

The Scipio brothers launched a major offensive in 211 BC. The Carthaginian armies were separated, Hasdrubal Gisco being near Gades (modern Cádiz) with 10,000 troops, Mago near Castulo with another 10,000, and Hasdrubal near Amtorgis with 15,000 soldiers. The Scipios planned to confront the Carthaginians simultaneously and comprehensively destroy their armies.

The coordination of the three Carthaginian armies was crucial in defeating and killing the Scipio brothers and destroying most of the Roman forces in Hispania in the battles that followed. The Scipios had split their army—Publius Scipio marching west with 20,000 soldiers to attack Mago near Castulo, while Gnaeus Scipio took 35,000 to attack Hasdrubal. Hasdrubal Gisco's force marched to join Mago, who, aided by Indibilis and Masinissa, defeated and killed Publius Scipio, then, with the combined armies, joined Hasdrubal to defeat and kill Gnaeus Scipio, all in a span of 23 days. However, the lack of coordination after the battle led to the escape of the Roman survivors, about 8,000 men, to the north of the Ebro River. These men checked Carthaginian attacks twice and were reinforced by 20,000 troops from Italy in 210 BC.

Publius Cornelius Scipio the Younger, exploiting the lack of coordination between the Carthaginian generals and the scattered location of their armies, ended up taking Cartagena in a daring expedition in 209 BC. Mago and his army were three days' march from Cartagena at that time. The Carthaginians moved their base to Gades.

In 208 BC, after the Battle of Baecula, Hasdrubal left Hispania to invade Italy and bring reinforcements to his brother Hannibal, who was operating in Lucania. Mago moved with his army to the area between the Tagus and Douro rivers in a recruiting mission of Spanish mercenaries with Hanno, a newly arrived general. Their mission was successful, as they gathered large masses of Spanish fighters, among them Cantabrians led by Larus, but they divided the army into two camps and relaxed their vigilance. Their army was surprised and scattered by Roman forces commanded by Marcus Junius Silanus in 207 BC; Hanno was captured, but Mago managed to lead a few thousand survivors to Gades, where he joined forces with Hasdrubal Gisco. The Carthaginians dispersed their army in several towns and focused on recruiting new mercenaries. This tactic frustrated Scipio's strategy to force a decisive battle that year.

Mago enjoyed joint command of the new army and raided the Roman army with his cavalry. The foresight of Scipio Africanus, who had kept his cavalry outside camp in a hidden position, led to the defeat of this raid.

After suffering defeat at the Battle of Ilipa in 206 BC, Hasdrubal Gisco returned to Africa, and Mago retreated to Gades with the remnants of his army. His deputy, another Hanno, was defeated by L. Marcius at the Battle of the Guadalquivir, and Mago was unable to take advantage of the rebellion of Hispanic tribes under Indibilis or the mutiny of the Roman troops at Sucro in 206 BC. He led an assault on Cartagena, believing the city to be lightly held, and was beaten back with severe losses. On returning, he found the gates of Gades barred. After crucifying the city magistrates for treason, he sailed away to the Balearic Islands.

== Third Carthaginian expedition to Italy ==
Mago then led a campaign to invade Italy (this time by sea) with 15,000 men in early summer 205 BC. The army sailed from Menorca to Liguria under the escort of 30 Carthaginian quinqueremes. Mago managed to capture Genoa, and he held control of northern Italy for nearly three years, warring with the mountain tribes and gathering troops. The Romans devoted seven legions to maintain watch over him and guard northern Italy, but no general action was fought. In 204 BC, Mago was reinforced with 6,000 infantry and some cavalry from Carthage. The Romans refused to give battle and blocked Mago, preventing him from reaching Hannibal.

Finally, the Romans engaged him in battle in Cisalpine Gaul. The Battle of Insubria was an indecisive Roman victory, but Mago was severely wounded. Soon after the battle, he was recalled back to Carthage along with Hannibal to aid in its defence, as the future Scipio Africanus major had shattered the armies of Hasdrubal Gisco, Hanno, son of Bomilcar, and had captured Syphax, who was allied to Carthage, in Africa. Mago and his army sailed from Italy in 202 BC under the escort of the Punic fleet, and were unmolested by the Roman navy as he made for Africa. Before arriving in Carthage, however, he died of his wound at sea.

According to Cornelius Nepos, however, Mago survived the war and stayed with his brother Hannibal for several years, until the Carthaginians ordered his arrest around 193 BC. He managed to escape, but either died in a shipwreck or was killed by his slaves. Most historians, however, give little credit to Nepos and prefer Livy's version.

The ability of Mago as a field commander can be glimpsed from his actions at the battles of Trebia and Cannae, where his failure might have doomed the Carthaginian army. He was a capable cavalry leader, as his repeated ambushes of the Romans in Iberia and Italy demonstrate.

== Legacy ==
The Port of Mahón in the Balearics was allegedly founded by him and still bears his name. The local egg sauce that is now consumed all over the world is called mayonnaise after the city.

== Mago in literature ==
- Pride of Carthage by David Anthony Durham
