= Hasdrubal Gisco =

Carthaginian general (died 202 BC)

Hasdrubal Gisco (died 202 BC), a latinization of the name ʿAzrubaʿal son of Gersakkun (Punic: 𐤏𐤆𐤓𐤁𐤏𐤋 𐤁𐤍 𐤂𐤓𐤎𐤊𐤍), was a Carthaginian general who fought against Rome in Iberia (Hispania) and North Africa during the Second Punic War.

== Biography ==
Hasdrubal Gisco was sent to Iberia with an army following the defeat of Hasdrubal Barca at the Battle of Dertosa in the spring of 215 BC. He arrived in Iberia in 214 BC. His arrival ended the absolute command of the Barcid family there. In 212 BC, the two Roman commanders in Iberia, Publius Cornelius Scipio and Gnaeus Cornelius Scipio Calvus, decided to take the offensive. Publius Scipio marched to encounter the Carthaginian forces commanded by Hasdrubal and Mago Barca, who had been reinforced by Numidian cavalry commanded by Masinissa. In a battle near Castulo, the Roman forces were defeated and Publius Scipio killed. Immediately after this victory, Hasdrubal hastened to join his army with that of Hasdrubal Barca. The combined Carthaginian forces were able to trap Gnaeus Scipio near Ilorca and won another victory, with Gnaeus Scipio killed less than a month after the death of his brother Publius.

After Hasdrubal Barca left for Italy by escaping the Battle of Baecula, Gisco retired to gather mercenaries in Lusitania. In 207 BC, Hasdrubal was near Gades in the south of the Iberian Peninsula, where he was joined by Mago Barca. In 206 BC, Hasdrubal raised further fresh troops to increase his army to 70,000 infantry and 4,500 cavalry. However, he and Mago were attacked by Scipio Africanus, the son of Publius Scipio, and heavily defeated at the Battle of Ilipa.

Hasdrubal now crossed to North Africa, where he persuaded Syphax, king of the Berber Masaesyli tribe of western Numidia, to ally himself with Carthage against Rome. Hasdrubal achieved this by offering Syphax his daughter Sophonisba in marriage. When Scipio landed in North Africa in 204 BC, he was opposed by Hasdrubal and Syphax with a combined force of 80,000 infantry and 13,000 cavalry. While negotiations continued, Scipio and his new ally Masinissa (who ironically had switched his allegiances to the Romans at almost the same time that the leader of the other Numidian faction, Syphax, had switched his to the Carthaginians) approached the Carthaginian-Numidian camp by stealth and set fire to it. According to Polybius, the Carthaginians and Numidians lost over 40,000 dead.

Syphax was apparently persuaded by his wife, Sophonisba, not to desert the Carthaginian cause, and he and Hasdrubal were joined by a force of about 4,000 Celtiberian mercenaries. They offered battle again, but were defeated with great slaughter by Scipio and Masinissa at the Battle of Bagbrades. Hasdrubal returned to Carthage, where he committed suicide in 202 BC to avoid being lynched by a Carthaginian mob.

As a general, he was not in the class of the Barcid brothers, although Livy describes him as "the best and most distinguished general this war produced after the three sons of Hamilcar". In another passage, Livy gives a much less complimentary quote from Quintus Fabius Maximus Verrucosus, who described Hasdrubal as "a general who showed his speed chiefly in retreat". He had a prodigious talent for diplomacy and three times raised large armies, in Iberia and in Africa, after severe defeats. Polybius says that he attempted to extract a large sum of money from Andobales, whom he describes as the most faithful friend the Carthaginians had in Iberia. Polybius says that when Andobales refused to pay, Hasdrubal brought a false accusation against him and forced him to give his daughters as hostages.

== See also ==
- Other Hasdrubals in Carthaginian history
