= Mercenaries of the ancient Iberian Peninsula =

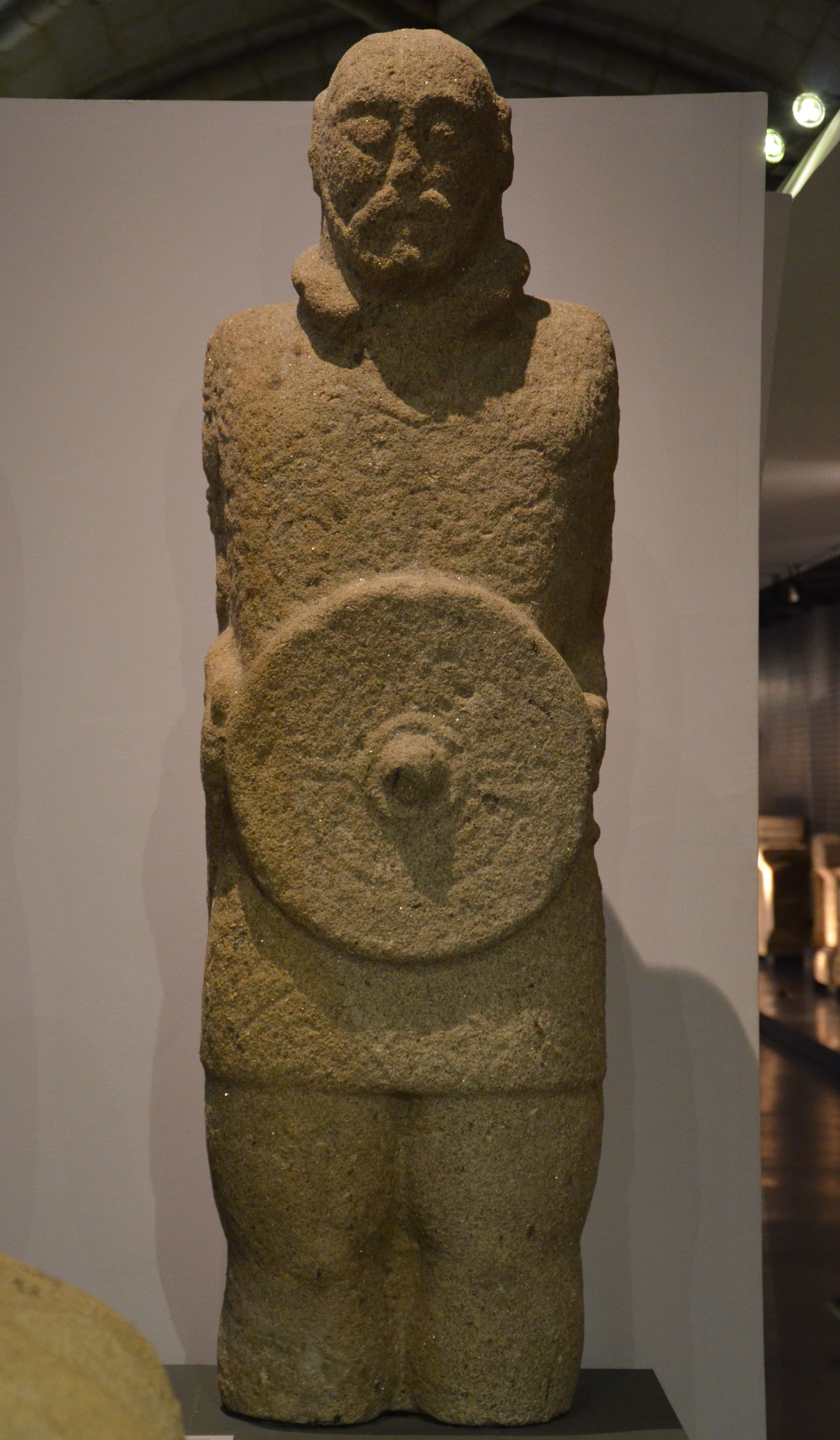
Statue of an ancient Lusitanian warrior from Lisbon, Portugal.

Mercenary life is recorded as a custom of Iron Age Spain, particularly in the central area of the Iberian Peninsula. Departing from the native tribe and serving militarily in others was a way for economically disadvantaged youth to escape poverty and find chances to use their fighting skills. Starting from 5th century BC, mercenary life would become a true social phenomenon in Hispania, with high numbers of fighters from distant lands coming to join the armies of Carthage, Rome, Sicily and even Greece, as well as other Hispanic peoples.

They are repeatedly described by authors like Strabo and Thucydides as being among the best fighting forces in the Mediterranean Sea area, as well as, according to Livy, the most elite unit in Hannibal's army (id roboris in omni exercitu). Polybius cites them as the reason for the Carthaginian victory in several battles during the Second Punic War. After Carthage's defeat, and with the Roman conquest of Hispania, Hispanic mercenaries were progressively integrated into the Roman army.

== Background ==
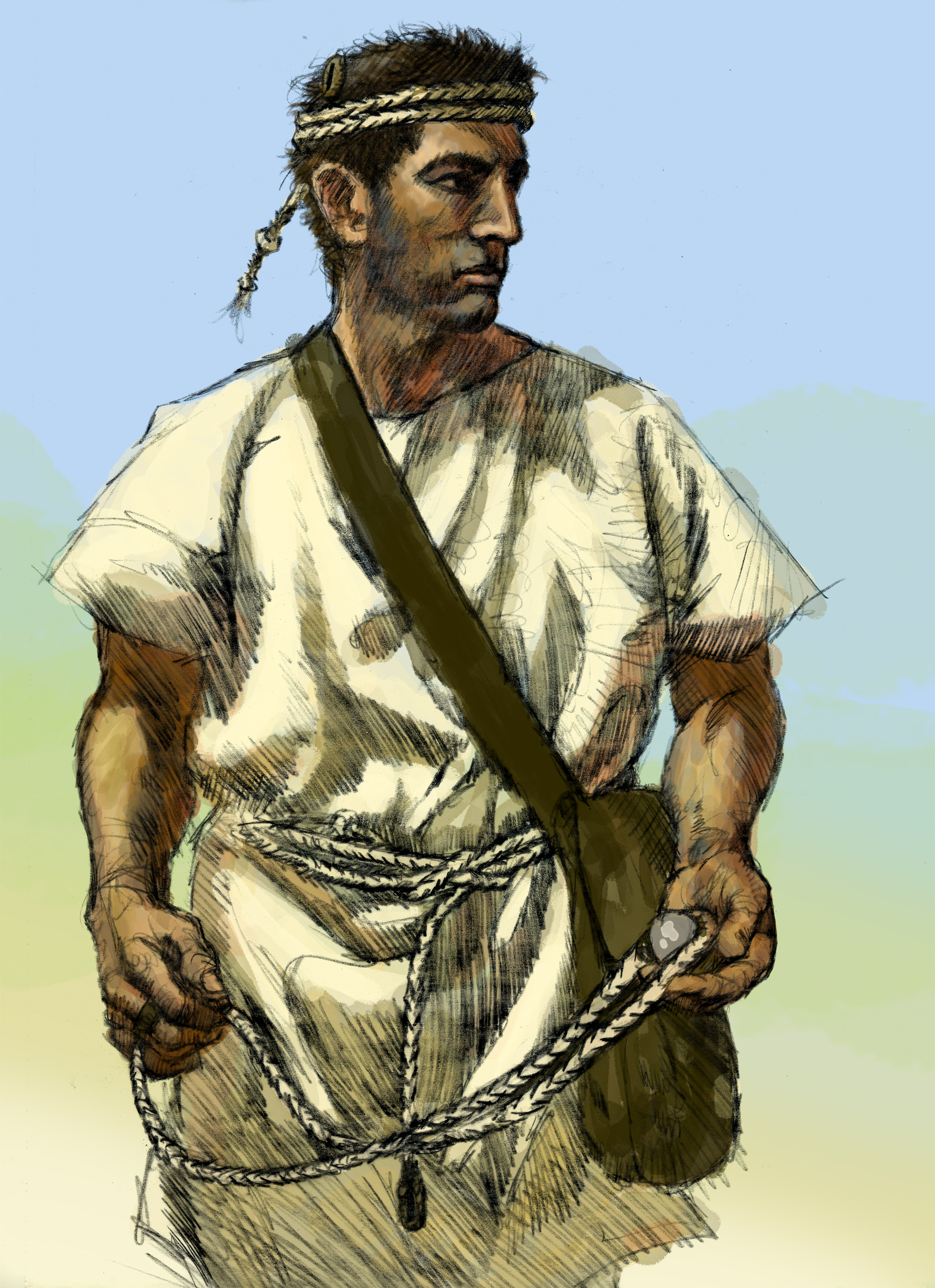
A Balearic slinger.

Differentiating between literal mercenaries and foreign vassals, brought to the battlefield through pacts or hostages instead of payment, is often difficult in ancient records. Similarly, the exact ethnicity of Hispanic mercenaries is difficult to ascertain, as the terms used to refer to inhabitants of the Iberian peninsula are frequently vague, often using the generic Iberian to mean not only the coastal Iberian tribes, but any other people of Hispania. However, there is evidence that Hispania developed as a rich source of mercenary work during the early Iron Age. The reasons for this were mainly economic, as departing from the native tribe and serving in a wealthier faction was a way for economically disadvantaged youth to escape poverty in their local lands, which were commonly subjected to sharp economic inequality. The main examples were found in Lusitania and Celtiberia, where cultivable terrains were concentrated among a few landowners, leaving mercenary life as the only alternative to banditry. However, the long history of tribal warfare and warrior culture between tribes in Hispania cannot be discarded as another factor in their choice. Natives from the Balearic Islands and mountain folk from Cantabria were also recognized to have a strong mercenary tradition.

Hispanic mercenaries would not work individually, but in small-sized units formed by friends and relatives, managed by their own chiefs and retaining their own cultural traits, including weapons and tactics. Mercenaries leaving Hispania would not always return to their lands, and some of them, like the Balearics, were known for spending all their gained money during their service, but they would be met with prestige and fame among their countrymen if they did, given the warrior character of their societies. Their destinations were not always foreign lands, but also nearby regions of Hispania with a better economical profile, like Turdetania or Bastetania. Important southern war chiefs like Indortes, Istolatios and possibly Audax, Ditalcus and Minurus were Celts hired by the Turdetanians. Nevertheless, the most important roles played by Hispanic mercenaries in ancient story were in the armies of Carthage, Rome and Hellenic countries. Important centers of recruitment were Gadir, Empúries, Castulo, Baria (modern day Villaricos) and the Balearic Islands. Hispanic mercenaries were sought after for their toughness, discipline and skills, aside from the quality of their weapons, and not least of all for their ferocity; it was sometimes claimed abroad that these peninsular warriors even practiced cannibalism.

== 5th–4th centuries BC ==
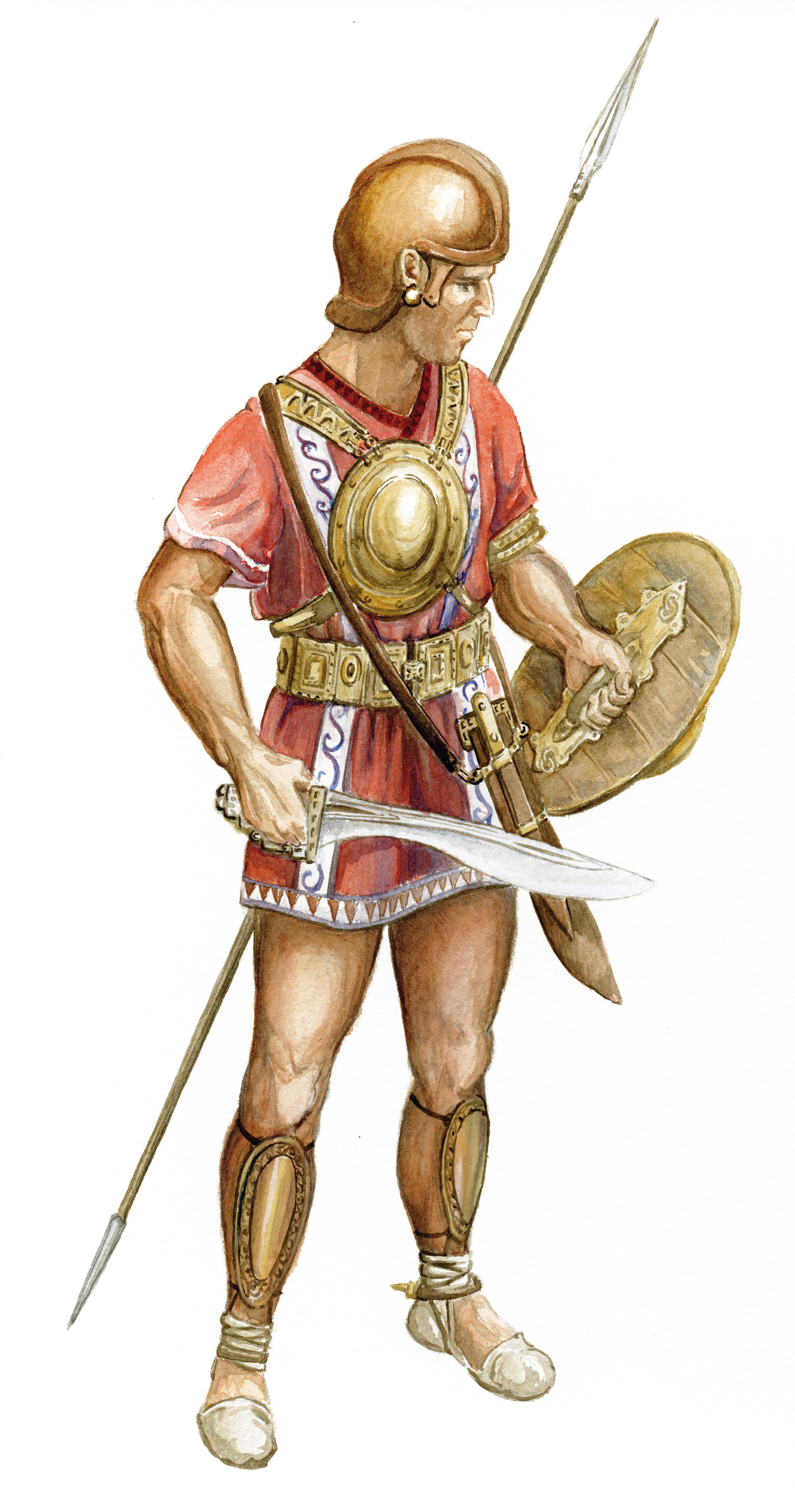
Imagining of an Iberian soldier.

The first mentions of Spanish mercenaries come from the Sicilian Wars (460–307 BC), described as part of the Carthaginian military serving in Sicily. While the Iberians may have been on the Carthaginian payroll as early as 535 BC, during the campaigns in Sardinia, their first substantial employment happened in the Battle of Himera in 480, where Diodorus and Herodotus record they were part of the expedition of Hamilcar I against the Greek forces of Gelo and Theron. After the battle, Hispanics were the only Punic combatants to regroup to defend the camp, inflicting heavy losses in the Greeks until Theron's counterattack forced them to withdraw to the beached ships. Contingents of Iberians reappear again in the captures of Selinus and Himera, where they headed the final assaults to the cities, and the battles of Akragas, Gela and Camarina, as well as the siege of Syracuse.

Possibly influenced by their success, Greeks started to employ Hispanics themselves in the Peloponnesian War, with Alcibiades bringing some with him to the Peloponnesian League after a recruitment campaign in Sicily. The latter conflict also saw the participation of Hispanics in the Athenian coup of 411 BC, helping the oligarchs under the orders of Aristarchus of Athens.

In 396 BC, after the Carthaginian general Himilco abandoned all of his mercenaries to their fate upon leaving Sicily in the Third Sicilian War, the Hispanics were the only not to be annihilated. According to Diodorus, they banded up in battle formation and offered Dionysius I of Syracuse their services, impressing Dionysius into hiring them as a personal guard. Later, in 368, his son Dionysius II sent a contingent of those Celts and Iberians to the Theban–Spartan War in order to assist the Spartans in the siege of Corinth, which they did with great effectivity. They also captured the territory of Sicyon before sailing back to Sicily.

When Plato visited his apprentice Dionysius II in 361 BC, he witnessed a brief rebellion by the king's mercenaries due to his attempts to reduce their payment. They marched towards the acropolis chanting their war paean, scaring Dionysius II so much that he relented and gave them even more than they reclaimed. Balearic slingers were also present in the Carthaginian side in the 311 Battle of the Himera River.

== 3rd century BC ==
In 274 BC, Hiero II of Syracuse ended the traditional mercenary presence in Sicily in order to prevent more mutinies. He pitted them against the Mamertines, a body of Italian marauders, in the river Cyamosorus near the city of Centuripa. Withholding his own citizen troops in order to stack the odds against the mercenaries, Hiero left them to their fates and saw them being defeated and decimated. However, it is likely he continued hiring Hispanic mercenaries anyway, as Livy mentions them as auxiliaries in the army of his grandson Hieronymus.

Carthaginian peninsular mercenaries did not return to Sicily until the First Punic War in 264, this time in the army commanded by Hanno. When Carthage lost the war, Hispanics were amongst the mercenaries transported to Africa to be paid off and discharged. When the Punics were unable to pay their emolument due to the economic sanctions imposed by Rome, the warriors revolted, leading to the Mercenary War and their eventual destruction by loyal Carthaginian forces led by Hamilcar Barca. It would be in the Second Punic War, though, that Iberian peninsulars become a factor again, given that Hispania was the main front of the war.

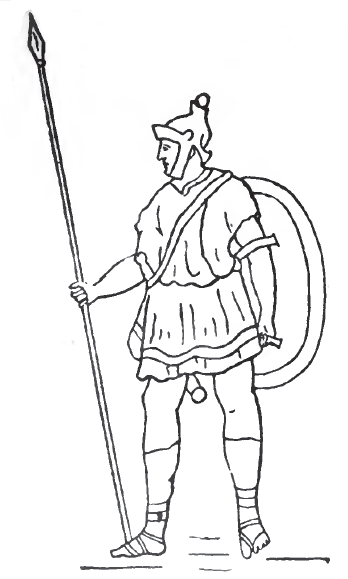
Imagining of a Spanish soldier in Hannibal's army.

Upon Hamilcar Barca's arrival to Hispania in 237 BC, he succeeded at conquering multiple Hispanic tribes and drawing reinforcements from them, employing alliances, payment and hostages depending on the case. His son Hannibal continued his effort after his death with plans to lead an expeditionary army to Italy. As mentioned earlier, in this case it is again difficult to differentiate between true mercenaries and conscripted vassals; it can only be inferred that they would work for a payment whenever they did not hail from conquered regions. In 218, before departing from Cartagena, he sent 16,000 Bastetani, Oretani and Olcade serfs to garrison Carthage in exchange for 15,200 African javelin throwers, seeking to prevent any possible rebellion of any of them by putting distance from their respective home lands. He also released, before crossing the Pyrenees, many Carpetanians who did not wish to leave Hispania. As a consequence of those moves, Hannibal kept only those with a bond of devotion to him, which would presumably include mercenaries and the most loyal vassals. It is estimated that between 8,000 and 10,000 Hispanics, counting the sum of their many peninsular peoples, reached Italy with Hannibal. The majority of them might have been still alive and serving when he returned to Carthage in 202, proving the reliability that had moved the Punics to hire them.

The variety and origin of the mercenaries is not faithfully recorded, other than Celtiberians, Lusitanians and Balearics, which Hannibal would arrange and use for their particular talents. The first served as heavy cavalry, in contrast to the lighter, skirmishing Numidian cavalry, though they were also entrusted the front lines as infantry in battles like Cannae, where they stood out for their ability to hold the line. Lusitanians are mentioned as having served as mountain troops, possibly playing the role of both skirmishers and heavy cavalry along with Celtiberians. Their combined force, composed of around 2,000 horsemen, was praised by Livy over their more numerous and famous Numidian homologues. Finally, Balearics, ranging between 1,000 and 2,000, excelled as skirmishing infantry, being armed with fibre or sinew slings capable of throwing heavy shot into enemy ranks with devastating effect. Silius Italicus speaks of even more tribes in the army, including Vettones, Gallaecians (combined with the Lusitanians in a single battalion), Cantabrians, Astures, and Vascones, although authors have doubted of such diversity. In any case, Celtiberians and Lusitanians probably were the main bodies of mercenaries, as Hannibal's spiel addressing them before the Battle of Ticinus attests.

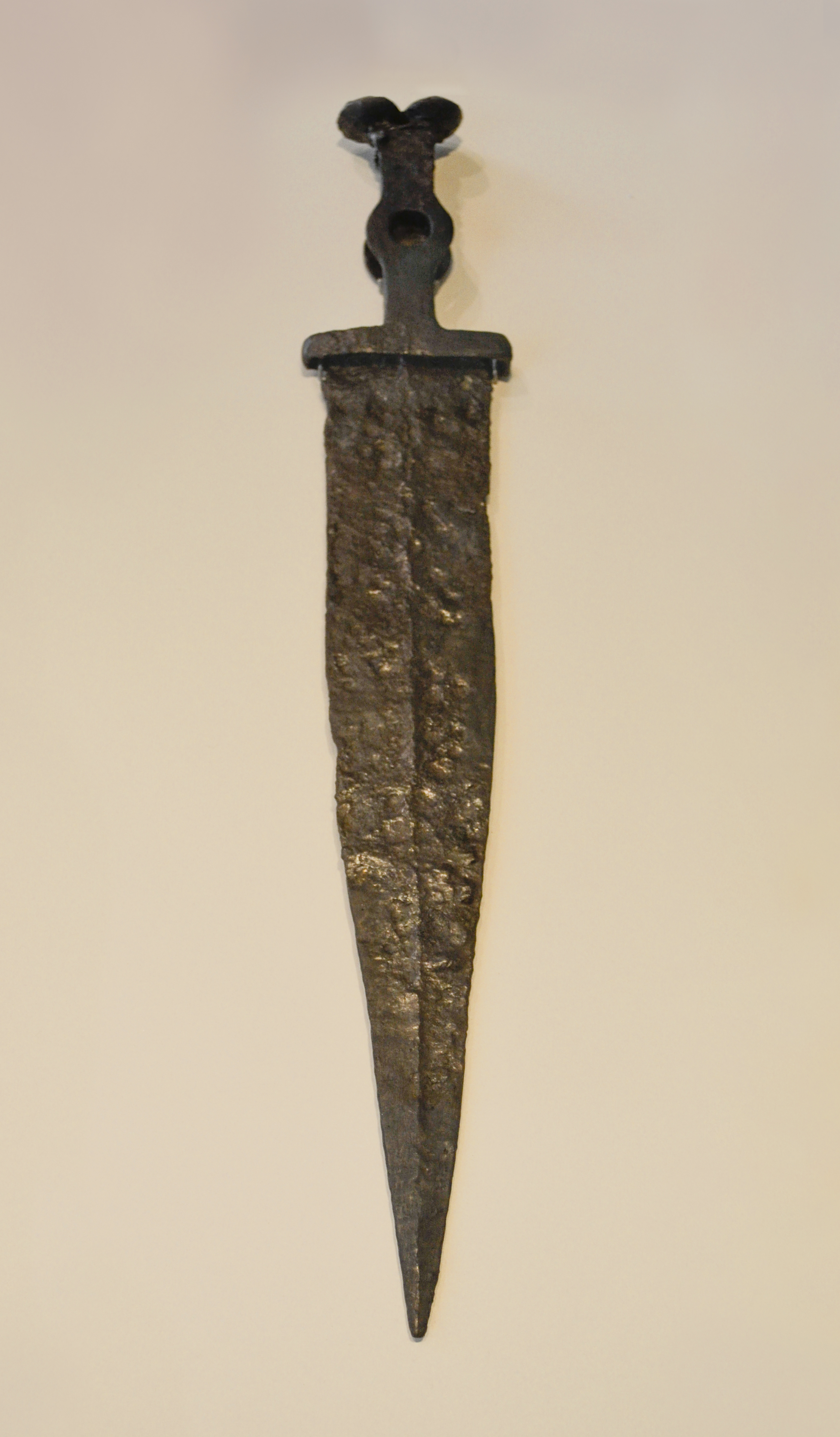
A Celtiberian gladius hispaniensis, used by Hannibal's mercenaries and adopted by the Romans.

Other Celtiberians fought against Carthage after striking a pact with Rome, defeating Hasdrubal Barca's forces in 217 BC. Four years later, they became the first mercenaries employed by Rome, as Publius Cornelius Scipio was forced to hire them to retain their allegiance. According to Livy and Appian, he sent 200 to Italy in order to try to convince their countrymen in Hannibal's army into deserting. This endeavor had little success, but it might have helped to undermine Hannibal's trust on them. In turn, Hasdrubal capitalized on his superior familiarity with Hispanic tribes to bribe Scipio's mercenaries, who agreed to abandon the Roman general even if they would not turn against him out of principles. The result was Scipio and his brother being killed near of Ilorci in 211 BC. The same year, possibly inspired by a desertion of Numidians and Hispanics to Marcus Claudius Marcellus after the Battle of Nola in 215, Celtiberians commanders Moericus and Belligenus betrayed the Punic-allied Syracusians and joined Marcellus's entourage. Another defection happened in Arpi, where 1,000 Hispanics chose to join the Roman side, although this might have been an exchange to get 5,000 Africans out of the city and back with Hannibal. Those seem to have been the only exceptions to the Hispanic mercenaries' loyalty. Hispanics seemingly held their Carthaginian masters in high regard, addressing them as their supreme commanders, and in many cases, such as during the defeats of Hasdrubal and Hanno, died fighting with suicidal determination for them. Hannibal considered his peninsular fighters to be among his most valuable forces, almost at the level of his more traditional Africans, and contrasting especially with the more expendable and undisciplined Gauls and Ligurians.

In 209 BC, after gathering large contingents of Celtiberian and Cantabrian mercenaries, Hasdrubal departed Hispania for Italy in order to meet with Hannibal. His army arrived in 207 only to be discovered and defeated in the Battle of the Metaurus, where Hasdrubal was killed among the peninsulars, the last Punic forces to fall. Some Celtiberians managed to cut their way out and reach Hannibal. The same year, generals Mago Barca and Hanno moved to Celtiberia to collect another army, but a new Roman attack, this time by Marcus Junius Silanus behind local guides and under orders from Scipio Africanus, ended it before they could depart too. This would be a tough decision for the Roman side, as their intrusion in the Celtiberians's lands would drive them against Rome again, making them join Indibilis and Mandonius's Iberian Ilergete revolt. Anyhow, Mago managed to flee with 2,000 survivors to Gadir. After the Battle of Ilipa, he sent a prefect also named Hanno to gather yet another Celtiberian contingent, but the resultant Battle of the Guadalquivir destroyed the third and final attempt to maintain a large scale native army. The remaining mercenaries, now up to 12,000 after the last levies, were placed by Mago in an improvised fleet, which finally sailed towards Italy after having unsuccessfully attempted to retake Cartagena. He also hired other 2,000 Balearics on the way.

The last great deployments of peninsular mercenaries in the Second Punic War were in the territorial defense of Carthage, firstly in a brief intervention after the Battle of Utica. Shortly after, taking command of 4,000 Celtiberians from the Ilergete revolt previously sent by Mago, Hasdrubal Gisco and Syphax clashed with the invading Romans led by Scipio in the Battle of the Great Plains. The encounter was bitter to both the Celtiberians and Scipio, as the former had shown mercy to them in Hispania despite their allegiance to Indibilis and Mandonius, so the mercenaries knew the Roman general would not spare them a second time. Consequently, when the mercenaries found themselves being characteristically the last Carthaginian force still standing in the battle, most of them chose to fight to the end and died in their posts. There were further attempts to bring new Hispanic fighters to Carthage, but the Saguntines captured the Carthaginian recruiters and sold them to Rome. In 202 BC, Hannibal brought the remnant of his veteran mercenaries from Italy and united them to those of Mago, who had died in the sea while returning to Africa. They faced Scipio again in the Battle of Zama, being ultimately defeated and witnessing the end of the war. The loss of Carthage saw the end of the Punic mercenary tradition, as it was specifically written among the conditions imposed by Rome.

== 2nd–1st centuries BC ==
Despite the withdrawal of Carthage from Hispania, the peninsular custom of mercenary life survived. Between 197 and 195 BC, the Turdetanians employed 30,000 Celtiberians as elite troops during the Iberian revolt, while in 147 BC the Romans themselves sent them unsuccessfully against the Lusitanians led by Viriathus. Julius Caesar would also use Balearic slingers in the Gallic Wars.

== 1st–4th centuries AD ==
The employment of Balearic slingers as mercenaries continued in the Imperial Roman army. The value of light infantry skilled in the use of stone missile throwing by slings was recognised as late as the 4th century AD, although by this date their recruitment basis had been extended from beyond Iberia and the Balearic Islands. The custom of native mercenaries ended with the integration of Hispanics in the Roman army after the Cantabrian Wars.

== See also ==
- Warfare in the ancient Iberian Peninsula
- Hispanics in the Roman army
- Almogavars
- Catalan Company
