= Indibilis and Mandonius =

Iberian chieftains

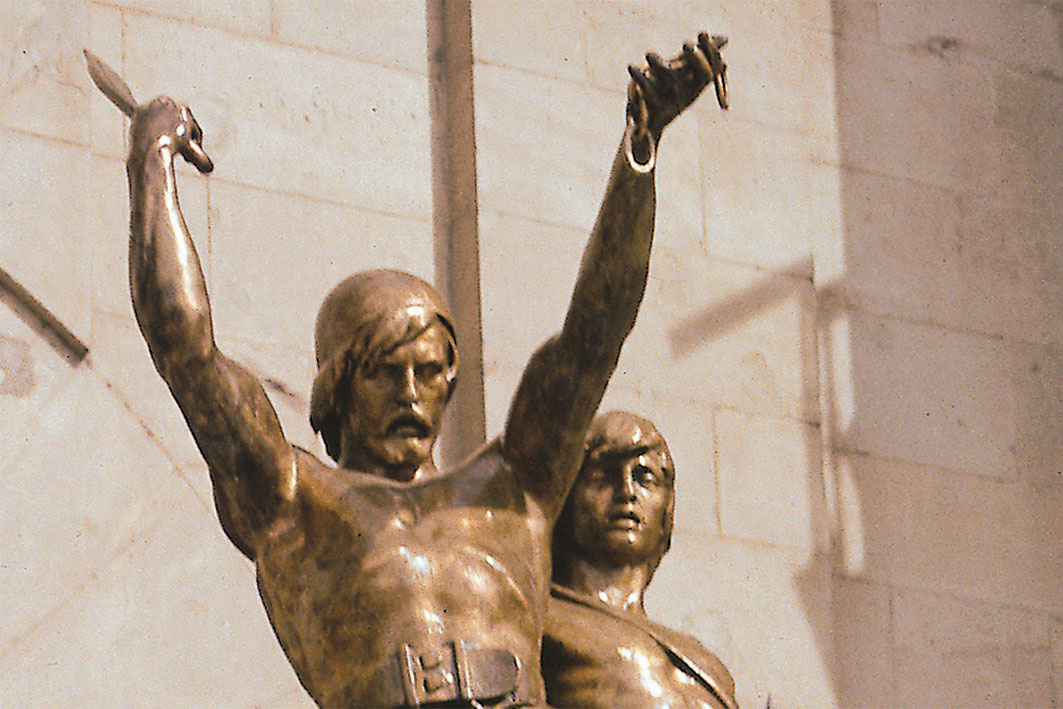
Indibilis (left) and Mandonius (right)

Indibilis and Mandonius (fl. 3rd century BC) were chieftains of the Ilergetes, an ancient Iberian people based in the Iberian Peninsula. Polybius speaks of the brothers as the most influential and powerful of the Iberian chieftains in that period. Livy calls one of the chieftains of the Ilergetes "Indibilis". At the same time, Polybius gives "Andobales" for the same person. They agree that his brother chieftain was Mandonius.

== Biography ==
Iberia 237-206BC

Indibilis fought against the Romans and sided with the Carthaginians at the Battle of Cissa in 218 BC, when Gnaeus Cornelius Scipio Calvus fought them. Indibilis and Carthaginian general Hanno were defeated at this battle and became a prisoner. In 217 BC, Indibilis regained his freedom and, with his younger brother Mandonius, decided to harass neighbouring Iberian tribes who were friendly to, or in alliance with, Rome. This harassment was fended off by Scipio Calvus by counter measures that involved killing some of Indibilis' tribesmen, taking some prisoner, and disarming the others. When Hasdrubal Barca, who was in north-western Spain, heard of this, he returned to help out his Iberian allies south of the Ebro River. At this time, the tide of war took a turn because of unexpected intelligence received by Scipio Calvus from the Celtiberians. The Celtiberi were encouraged to collaborate with Scipio Calvus and invade New Carthage. On the way there, the combined armies took three fortified towns and fought two successful battles against Hasdrubal, Indibilis, and Mandonius. Scipio Calvus' combined armies killed 15,000 of the enemy and took 4,000 prisoners.

As a result, Indibilis and Mandonius and their remaining tribesmen stayed out of the picture until 211 BC. At that time, they gathered 7,500 Suessetani and joined forces with Hasdrubal. Publius Cornelius Scipio, father to Scipio Africanus and younger brother of Scipio Calvus, decided to attack the Iberian chieftain brothers as they were moving across his line of retreat from his camp. Cornelius Scipio did not want to be trapped and surrounded by Carthaginians. He marched at midnight to meet them and skirmished with them at daybreak. Cornelius Scipio was speared with a lance and killed during the Battle of Castulo, part of the Battle of the Upper Baetis. Scipio Calvus was killed at the Battle of Ilorca, the other part of the battle of the Upper Baetis, a few days later.

Even though the chieftains were generally pro-Carthaginian, for which they were rewarded by being given back their tribal territories after the death of the two Scipios in 211 BC, they soon changed their minds after the conduct of the Carthaginian general Hasdrubal Gisco. He demanded money from them for his own benefit. He also required that the wife of Mandonius and the daughters of Indibilis be held at New Carthage in pledge for their fathers' fidelity. The hostages were part of the booty when Scipio Africanus captured New Carthage in 209 BC. Africanus treated them with much dignity and returned them to their rightful places, which impressed the Iberians.

The two brothers soon abandoned the Carthaginians and sided with the Romans. In 209 BC, they concluded a treaty of alliance with the Romans which involved most of the Iberian tribes. They then collaborated in a campaign against Hasdrubal Gisco which ended in a victory at the Battle of Baecula in 208 BC.

Because of the presence of the Roman general Africanus, Indibilis and Mandonius maintained a friendly association with the Romans. However, when a rumour spread in 206 BC that Africanus was seriously ill and possibly dead, they started a rebellion aimed at getting the Romans to leave Iberia. This rumour also started a mutiny at the military camp at the Sucro River, which involved some 8,000 soldiers. Indibilis and Mandonius sided with the mutineers. Africanus recovered and returned to good health and ultimately defeated the mutiny with the thirty-five ringleaders beheaded. He then fought the armies of Indibilis and Mandonius and defeated them. Indibilis and Mandonius surrendered to Africanus asking for mercy. Indibilis and Mandonius were subsequently released by Scipio on favourable terms.

The next year, Africanus left Spain in the hands of his generals L. Lentulus and L. Manlius and returned to Rome to prepare for an attack on Carthage. Since Africanus was the only Roman general of whom Indibilis and Mandonius were afraid, they roused the Iberian tribes and assembled an army of 30,000 foot soldiers and 4,000 cavalry and decided to rebel again. In a battle with the Romans, the Iberians were all but destroyed. Indibilis was killed during the battle and Mandonius escaped with the remnants of his forces. As part of the peace terms dictated by Rome, he was given up by his tribesmen to the Romans; what became of him is unknown.

== Sources ==
=== Primary Sources ===
- Appian, Roman History
- Cassius Dio, Roman History
- Livy, Ab urbe condita
- Polybius, Histories

=== Secondary Sources ===
- Acciaiuoli, Donato, Plutarch's Lives of the noble Grecians and Romans, Translated by Sir Thomas North, D. Nutt, 1896
- Ihne, Wilhelm, The history of Rome, Volume 2, Longmans, Green, and Co., 1871
- Liddell, Sir Basil Henry Hart A Greater than Napoleon: Scipio Africanus, Biblo & Tannen Publishers, 1971, ISBN 0-8196-0269-8
- Raleigh, Sir Walter, The Works of Sir Walter Ralegh, Kt: The history of the world, 1829
- Smith, William; Dictionary of Greek and Roman Biography and Mythology, Volume 2; Boston, Mass; Little, Brown and Company (1870)
- Williams, Henry Smith, The Historians' History of the World, The Outlook company, 1904
