= Battle of Baecula =

Battle in Iberia during the Second Punic War (208 BC)

- Part of the Second Punic War
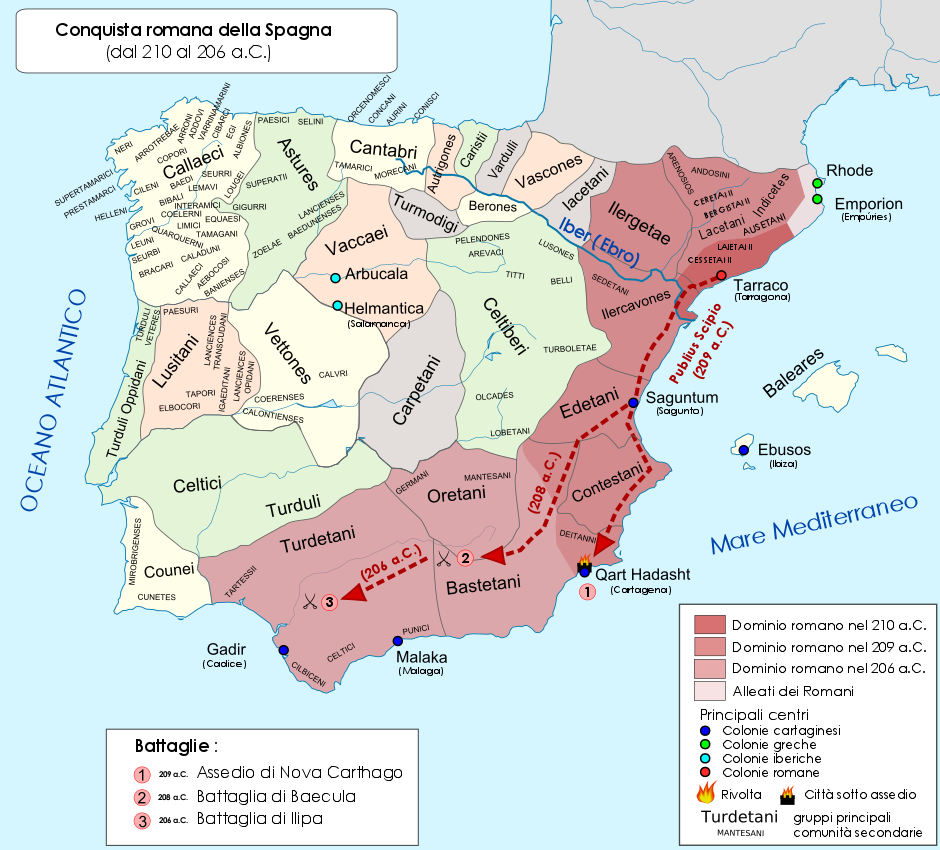
- Roman conquest of Carthaginian Spain, 210–206 BC
Date	Spring 208 BC
Location	Baecula (Santo Tomé, Jaén), present-day Spain 38.007°N 3.119°W
Result	Roman victory

Belligerents
Roman Republic	Carthage

Commanders and leaders
Scipio Africanus	Hasdrubal Barca

Strength
40,000 30,000 Romans and Italians; 10,000 Iberian	30,000

Casualties and losses
Unknown	20,000 8,000 killed (Livy); 12,000 captured (Polybius)

The Battle of Baecula was a major field battle in Iberia during the Second Punic War. Roman Republican and Iberian auxiliary forces under the command of Scipio Africanus routed the Carthaginian army of Hasdrubal Barca.

== Prelude ==
According to Polybius, after Scipio’s surprise attack and capture of Carthago Nova, the three Carthaginian armies in Iberia remained separated, and their generals at odds with each other, thus giving the Romans a chance to deal with them one by one.

Early in 208 BC, Scipio Africanus, with 30,000 Roman and Italian troops and 10,000 Spanish auxiliaries, moved against Hasdrubal Barca, whose 30,000-strong force had wintered at Baecula, on the upper reaches of the river Baetis (modern day Guadalquivir).

On learning of the Roman approach, Hasdrubal shifted his camp to a strong defensive position – a high and steep plateau south of Baecula, protected by ravines on the flanks and the river to the front and rear. Moreover, the plateau was formed into two steps, on which Hasdrubal posted his light troops on the lower one and his main camp behind.

After his arrival, Scipio was at first uncertain as to how to attack such a formidable position, but concerned that the other two Carthaginian armies might take advantage of his inaction and join with Hasdrubal Barca, he took action on the third day.

== Battle ==
Before his main attack, Scipio sent one detachment to block the entrance to the valley separating the two armies and one to the road leading north to Baecula, thus providing security to his main force, while harassing any Carthaginian attempt to retreat.

After these preliminary deployments were done, the Roman light troops advanced against their Carthaginian counterparts on the first step. Despite the steep slope, and under a shower of arrows, the Romans had little difficulty driving back the Carthaginian light troops once they got into hand-to-hand combat.

After reinforcing his leading force, Scipio derived a pincer attack on the flanks of the Carthaginian main camp by ordering Gaius Laelius to lead half of the remaining heavy foot to the right of the enemy position, and he himself scaling the left.

Hasdrubal, meanwhile, was under the impression that the Roman attack was only a skirmish (Scipio had hidden his main army in camp until the final attack) and failed to properly deploy his main force, thus his ill-prepared army was caught on three sides by the Romans.

Despite being trapped, Hasdrubal was able to retreat unmolested with his elephants, main baggage train, and some of his Carthaginian troops. It appeared that his main losses in the battle were the majority of his light troops and Iberian allies. This was largely due to the legionnaires' choice to plunder the Carthaginian camp rather than pursue Hasdrubal with any earnestness.

== Aftermath ==
After the battle, Hasdrubal led his depleted army (mainly formed by Celtiberian mercenaries and Gallic warriors) over the western passes of the Pyrenees into Gaul, and subsequently into Italy in an attempt to join his brother Hannibal.

Scipio's failure to stop Hasdrubal's march to Italy was criticized by the Roman Senate. Scipio did not exploit his victory at Baecula to drive out the Carthaginians from Iberia, instead choosing to withdraw to his base at Tarraco. He secured alliances with many of the Iberian tribes, who switched sides after the Roman successes at Carthago Nova and Baecula.

Carthaginian reinforcements landed in Iberia in 207 BC, and would soon launch a final attempt to recover their losses at the Battle of Ilipa in 206 BC.

== Bibliography ==
=== Primary ===
- Polybius; The Rise of the Roman Empire; Trans. Ian Scott-Kilvert; 1979; ISBN 0-14-044362-2
- Livy Titus Livius; "Complete Works of Livy"; DelphiClassics.com 2014 (in Latin & English)

=== Secondary ===
- Hoyos, Dexter (2015). Mastering the West: Rome and Carthage at War. Oxford: Oxford University Press. ISBN 978-0-19-986010-4.
