= Alcalá del Río =

Coordinates: 37°31′N 5°58′W

- Flag Coat of arms

- Location in Spain.
- Country: Spain
- Autonomous community: Andalusia

Area
  - Total: 81.2 km^{2} (31.4 sq mi)
- Elevation: 30 m (98 ft)

Population (2025-01-01)
  - Total: 12,335
  - Density: 152/km^{2} (393/sq mi)
- Time zone: UTC+1 (CET)
  - Summer (DST): UTC+2 (CEST)
- Website: www.alcaladelrio.es

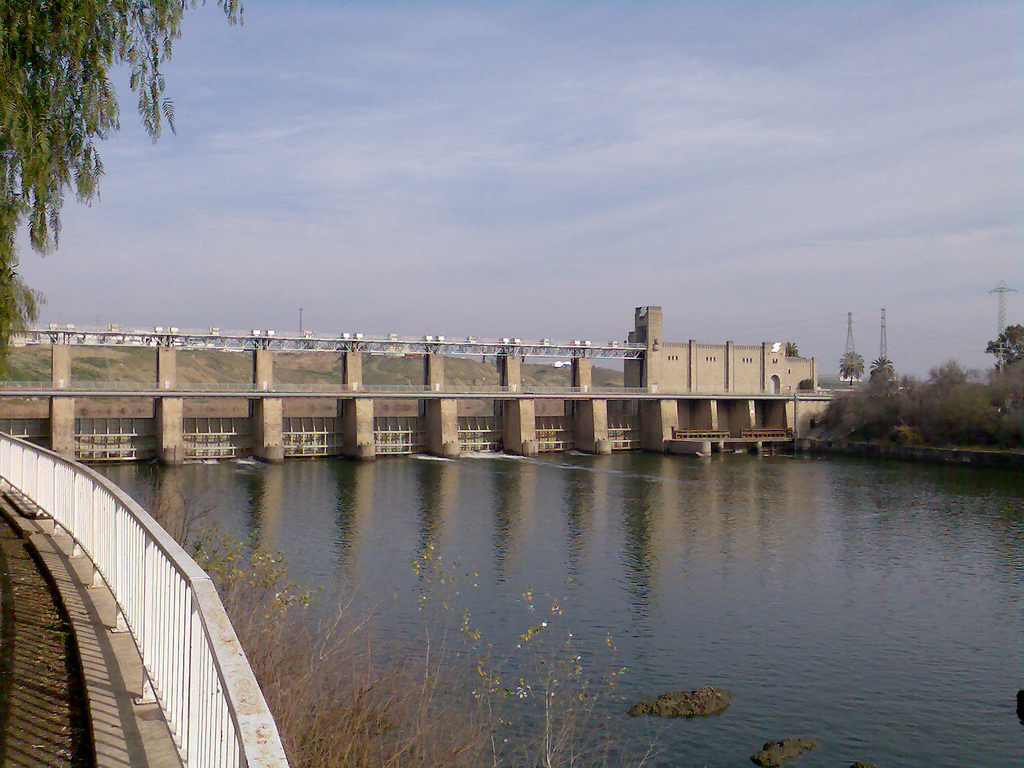
A Dam in Alcalá del Río

Alcalá del Río is a municipality in Seville, Spain. It had a population of 9,317 in 2005. It has an area of about 83 square kilometers and has a population density of 112.3 people per square kilometer. It has an altitude of 30 meters (about 100 feet) and is situated 13 kilometers away from Seville.

== See also ==
- List of municipalities in Seville
