= Marcus Junius Silanus (praetor 212 BC) =

Ancient Roman general and statesman

Marcus Junius Silanus was one of the most successful Roman commanders in the Spanish theatre of the Second Punic War. He is best remembered for his defeat of Hanno and Mago in Celtiberia in 207 BC.

== Early career ==
A member of the celebrated plebeian gens Junia, Silanus first appears in history in 216 BC, when he was appointed prefect over the Roman garrison at Neapolis, one of the cities of Magna Graecia that had requested protection from the Carthaginian general Hannibal. He was praetor in 212, and assigned the province of Etruria, where he remained as propraetor the following year. During this time, he purchased and despatched grain for the Roman army besieging Capua.

== In Spain ==
In 210 BC, Silanus' imperium was prorogued for a second time, (Note: As Silanus had never been consul, scholars generally presume that his authority remained that of a propraetor; but it may be that like Scipio, who likewise had yet to hold the consulship, the Roman Senate granted him imperium pro consule, thereby giving him a level of authority equal to the other Roman commanders in Spain.) and he accompanied the proconsul Scipio Africanus to Hispania, where he remained for the duration of the Iberian campaign. On their arrival that autumn, Silanus succeeded to the command of Gaius Claudius Nero, who had been sent to Spain as propraetor the preceding year.

When Scipio took his army to conquer Carthago Nova in 209, Silanus remained in command of the forces south of the Iberus, holding the region the following year. In 207, at Scipio's direction, he attacked a large army that had been gathered by the Carthaginian commanders Hanno and Mago in Celtiberia, utterly defeating them with his much smaller force.

In 206, Silanus participated in various operations, and participated in the Battle of Ilipa. When Scipio traveled to Numidia to meet with Syphax, he left Silanus in charge of the Roman forces based at Carthago Nova, while Lucius Marcius Septimus was placed in command at Tarraco. Polybius reports that this arrangement was continued when Scipio returned, but according to Livy they were succeeded by Lucius Cornelius Lentulus and Lucius Manlius Acidinus.

== Legacy ==
Nothing further is reported of Silanus, unless as some scholars suppose, he is to be identified with the Marcus Junius Silanus who, as praefectus socium under the command of Marcus Claudius Marcellus in 196 BC, was slain in battle against the Boii, along with his colleague, Tiberius Sempronius Gracchus. However, this Silanus was probably his son.

== Bibliography ==
- Polybius, Historiae (The Histories).
- Titus Livius (Livy), History of Rome.
- Appianus Alexandrinus (Appian), Iberica (The Iberian War).
- Dictionary of Greek and Roman Biography and Mythology, William Smith, ed., Little, Brown and Company, Boston (1849).
- August Pauly, Georg Wissowa, et alii, Realencyclopädie der Classischen Altertumswissenschaft (Scientific Encyclopedia of the Knowledge of Classical Antiquities, abbreviated RE or PW), J. B. Metzler, Stuttgart (1894–1980).
- T. Robert S. Broughton, The Magistrates of the Roman Republic, American Philological Association (1952–1986).
