= Hasdrubal Barca =

Carthaginian general (245–207 BC)

- 𐤏𐤆𐤓𐤁𐤏𐤋
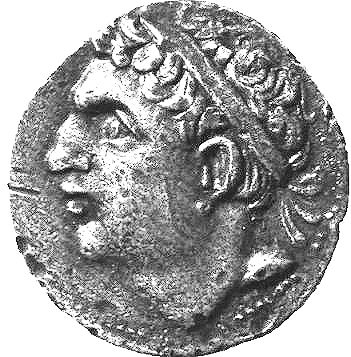
- A coin showing Hasdrubal as the strategos of Iberia
- Born: 245 BC; Carthage, Ancient Carthage (modern Tunisia)
- Died: 22 June 207 BC (aged 38); Metauro River, Roman Republic
- Office: Strategos of Iberia (218 BC–207 BC)
- Father: Hamilcar Barca
- Relatives: Hannibal (brother); Mago (brother)

Military service
- Allegiance: Carthage
- Branch/service: Carthaginian Army
- Rank: General
- Commands: Carthaginian forces in Iberia
- Battles/wars: Second Punic War; Battle of Cissa; Battle of Ebro River; Battle of Ibera; Battle of Munda; Battle of the Upper Baetis; Battle of Baecula; Battle of the Metaurus †

Hasdrubal Barca (245 – 22 June 207 BC), a latinization of the Punic ʿAzrubaʿal (Punic: 𐤏𐤆𐤓𐤁𐤏𐤋, romanized: ʿAzrōbaʿl), son of Hamilcar Barca, was a Carthaginian general in the Second Punic War. He was the brother of Hannibal and Mago Barca.

== Youth and Iberian leadership ==
Little is known of Hasdrubal's early life. He was present, along with his older brother Hannibal, when his father, Hamilcar Barca, died in battle against the Iberians. Hamilcar may have drowned in the Júcar, although the sources do not agree. Little is also known about Hasdrubal's activities during the time Hasdrubal the Fair led the Punic forces in Spain, or during the campaigns of Hannibal Barca in Spain and his Siege of Saguntum.

Hannibal left a force of 13,000 infantry, 2,550 cavalry and 21 war elephants in Hispania when he marched for Italy in 218 BC. Hasdrubal commanded this force and he was to set out for Italy in 217 BC to reinforce Hannibal. Hannibal left another army under Hanno in Catalonia, consisting of 10,000 foot and 1,000 horse, on his way to Italy in 218 BC. Hasdrubal was destined to fight for the next six years against the brothers Gnaeus and Publius Cornelius Scipio commanding an army which initially numbered 4 legions (8,000 Roman and 14,000 allied infantry, 600 Roman and 1,600 allied horse) along with 60 quinqueremes. The Punic navy had a fleet of 50 quinqueremes and 5 triremes stationed in Spain, however, only 32 Quinqueremes were manned at the start of the Second Punic War.

The expedition led by Gnaeus Scipio in 218 BC had caught the Carthaginians by surprise, and before Hasdrubal could join Hanno in Catalonia, the Carthaginian commander on the north of the Ebro, the Romans had fought and won the Battle of Cissa and established their army at Tarraco and their fleet at Emporiae. Hasdrubal, commanding only 8,000 troops and outnumbered by the Romans, raided the Romans with a flying column of light infantry and cavalry, which inflicted severe losses on their naval crews and reduced the fighting strength to 35 ships. This loss was offset by the arrival of an allied Greek contingent from the city of Massilia.

In the spring of 217 BC, Hasdrubal led a joint expedition north to fight the Romans. He commanded the army, while his deputy Himilco commanded the fleet. The Punic army and the fleet moved north side by side and encamped on the mouth of the Ebro River. Carelessness of the Carthaginian fleet enabled Gnaeus Scipio to surprise the Carthaginians and crush their naval contingent at the Battle of Ebro River. Hasdrubal was obliged to march back to Cartagena, fearing seaborne attacks on Carthaginian territories. With the Iberian contingent of the Carthaginian navy shattered, Hasdrubal was forced to either call Carthage for reinforcements or build new ships. He did neither.

The performance of the Iberian crews had been poor in the battle, and their dismissal sparked a rebellion in the Turdetani tribe. Hasdrubal would spend all of 216 BC subduing the rebels around the area near Gades. Hasdrubal received orders from Carthage to move into Italy and join up with Hannibal in order to put pressure on the Romans in their homeland, but Hasdrubal delayed, arguing that Carthaginian authority over the Iberian tribes was too fragile and the Roman forces in the area too strong for him to execute the planned movement. Hasdrubal was reinforced by 4,000 infantry and 500 cavalry and was ordered by the Carthaginian senate to march to Italy in the same year, and he spent 216 BC crushing the Iberian rebels near Gades.

Hannibal Barca had defeated the Romans at the Battle of Cannae in August of 216 BC, resulting in the defection of most of South Italy, and in the north the Gauls had wiped out 25,000 Roman and Italian soldiers in the Battle of Silva Litana, putting Rome on the defensive in North Italy. Hannibal had sent his youngest brother, Mago, who had marched into Italy with him in 218 BC, to Carthage to gather reinforcements. Carthaginian Senate had authorized sending 4,000 Numidian cavalry, 40 elephants and 500 talents to Hannibal, and Mago was given the authority to raise additional 20,000 infantry and 4,000 cavalry, and he had raised an army of 12,000 infantry, 1500 cavalry and 20 war elephants, by the spring of 215 BC, which was meant to land at Locri in Italy. Carthage had sent an army and fleet under Himilco to guard Iberia in 216 BC, leaving Hasdrubal free to invade North Italy, catching the Romans in a strategic pincer movement in Central Italy.

Hasdrubal left Cartagena in the spring of 215 BC and marched for the Ebro, besieged a pro-Roman town and offered battle at Ibera. In this battle, Hasdrubal used his cavalry superiority to attempt to clear the field while attempting to envelop the enemy on both sides with his infantry. However, the Romans broke through the thinned-out center of the Carthaginian line and then defeated each wing separately, inflicting severe losses, and taking heavy losses themselves.

The Scipios' victory ensured Hasdrubal's failure to reinforce Hannibal overland when the Carthaginians held the upper hand in Italy, and also robbed Hannibal of anticipated seaborne reinforcements and further weakened the Carthaginian hold on the Iberian tribes. Mago and his army were diverted to Iberia after the Carthaginian defeat at Ibera. The classicist Howard Scullard is of the opinion that the Roman victory prevented them from being expelled from Iberia, not least because the Iberian tribes would have abandoned Rome; and from Hasdrubal promptly marching at full strength to reinforce Hannibal in Italy, where "Rome could hardly withstand the double force." Klaus Zimmermann agrees: "the Scipios' victory ... may well have been the decisive battle of the war" The Carthaginians from then on were forced to contest the Romans in the area between the Ebro and Jucar.

== Joint command ==
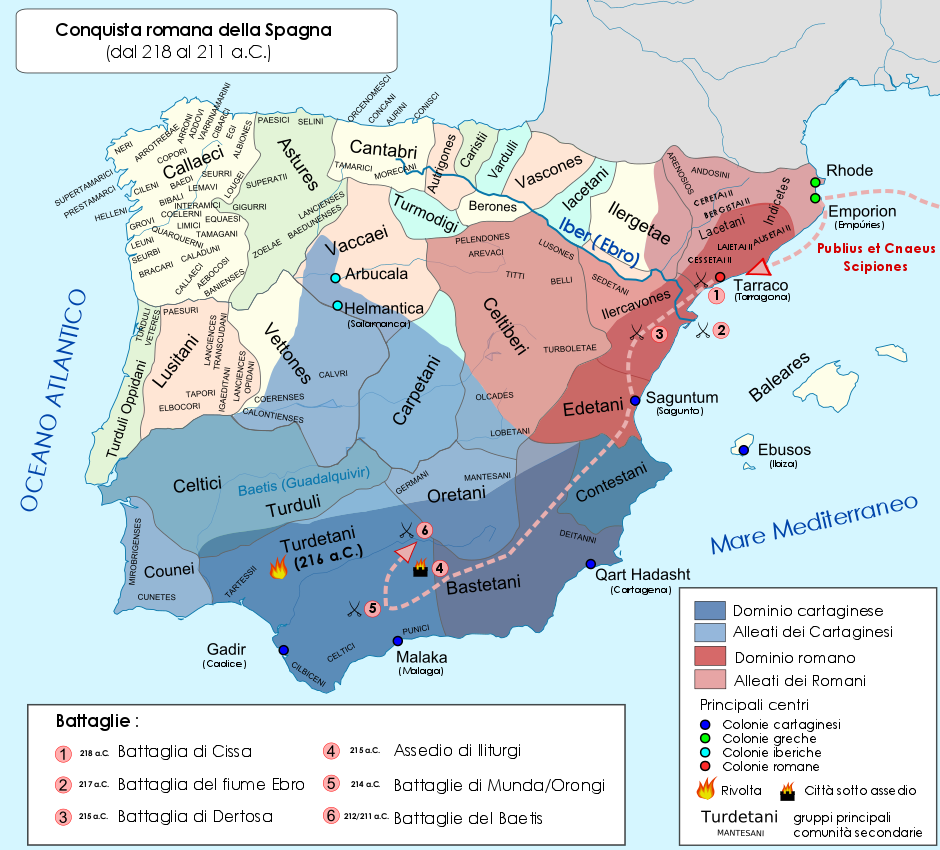
Roman operations in Spain, 218–211 BC. Included are several probably ahistorical engagements.

This defeat also led to Mago and Hasdrubal Gisco arriving in Iberia with two armies and ending the undisputed command of the Barcid family in Iberia. The Carthaginians fought the Scipio brothers and had on the whole the worst of the conflict between 215 and 212 BC, but managed to prevent the loss of any territory. According to Livy, the Romans fought multiple battles against the Carthaginians south of the Ebro from 215 to 214 BC, at Iliturgi, Munda, and Orongi. Livy's chronology is confused and contradicted by Polybius, who explicitly states that the Scipio brothers did not venture south of the Ebro until 212 BC. As a result, most historians consider these engagements to be ahistorical.

At the instigation of the Romans, Syphax, one of the kings of the Numidian tribes, attacked Carthaginian territories in Africa in 213/212 BC. The situation in Iberia was sufficiently under control, because Hasdrubal and his Iberian army crossed over to Africa and crushed the threat of Syphax in a battle where 30,000 Numidians were killed. With his Roman-trained army shattered, Syphax fled to Mauritania. The aid of Masinissa, a Numidian prince, was invaluable during this episode, and he crossed over to Iberia with Hasdrubal after the African expedition ended with 3,000 Numidian cavalry.

The Roman commanders captured Saguntum in 212 BC and in 211 BC hired 20,000 Celtiberian mercenaries to reinforce their army. Observing that the three Carthaginian armies were deployed apart from each other, the Romans split their forces and invaded Carthaginian territory with the aim of defeating the Carthaginian forces in detail. However, In late 212 BC, Hasdrubal, with timely cooperation from Mago Barca and Hasdrubal Gisco, completely routed his opponents at the Battle of the Upper Baetis, destroying the majority of the Roman army in Iberia and killing both the Scipios. Carthaginians gained control of Iberia up to the Ebro as a result of this victory. However, the lack of cooperation between the Carthaginian generals led to the surviving Roman force of 8,000 retiring safely to the north of the river Ebro. These troops somehow managed to keep the Carthaginian armies from gaining a foothold north of the Ebro and resist all Carthaginians efforts to expel them. The Romans reinforced this detachment with 10,000 troops under Claudius Nero in 211 BC to stabilize the situation, and with another 10,000 soldiers under Scipio Africanus Major in 210 BC, who spent the year training his army and improving his diplomatic contacts.

== Second Carthaginian expedition to Italy ==
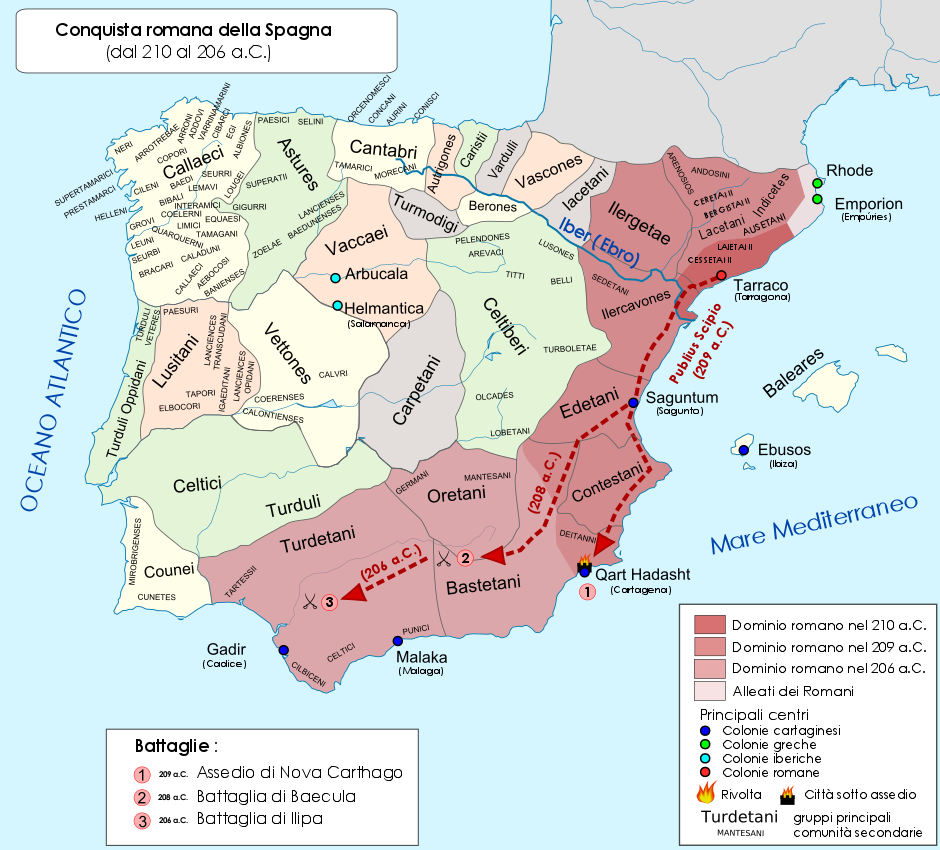
Roman operations in Spain, 210–206 BC. Included are several probably ahistorical engagements.

The Carthaginian armies had dispersed into the interior of Iberia in 209 BC, possibly to maintain control over the Iberian tribes, which they were dependent on for soldiers and provisions. The Carthaginian armies were subsequently outgeneraled by Scipio Africanus Major, who, taking advantage of the absence of the three Carthaginian armies in 209 BC, captured Carthago Nova and gained other advantages. Hasdrubal was defeated by Scipio at the Battle of Baecula but managed to retreat with two-thirds of his army intact.

Later in 208 BC, Hasdrubal was summoned to join his brother in Italy. He eluded Scipio by crossing the Pyrenees at their western extremity and safely made his way into Gaul in the winter of 208. Scipio's failure to stop Hasdrubal's march to Italy was criticized by the Roman Senate. Scipio did not exploit his victory at Baecula to drive out the Carthaginians from Iberia, instead choosing to withdraw to his base at Tarraco. He secured alliances with many of the Iberian tribes, who switched sides after the Roman successes at Carthago Nova and Baecula. Hasdrubal waited until the spring of 207 to make his way through the Alps and into Northern Italy. Hasdrubal made much faster progress than his brother had, partly due to the construction left behind by Hannibal's army when he had passed via the same route a decade earlier, but also due to the removal of the Gallic threat that had plagued Hannibal early on. The Gauls now feared and respected the Carthaginians, and not only was Hasdrubal allowed to pass through the Alps uncontested, his ranks were bolstered by many enthusiastic Gauls. Hasdrubal, in the same fashion as his brother, succeeded in bringing his war elephants, raised and trained in Hispania.

It was not until Hasdrubal sent messengers to Hannibal that decisive measures were taken. Hasdrubal wished to meet with his brother in South Umbria. However, this was not to be. Hasdrubal's messengers were captured, and he was ultimately checked by two Roman armies. Being forced to give battle, he was decisively defeated at the Battle of the Metaurus. Hasdrubal, with his armies defeated and in full disorganized retreat, charged into the fray to his certain death, and was beheaded. His head was packed into a sack and thrown into his brother Hannibal's camp as a sign of his utter defeat. This action was in stark contrast to Hannibal's treatment of the bodies of fallen Roman Consuls.

The significance of the Battle of the Metaurus is recognized amongst historians. It is included in Edward Shepherd Creasy's The Fifteen Decisive Battles of the World (1851), the rationale being that it effectively removed the Carthaginian threat from Rome's ascendancy to global dominion by leaving Hannibal stranded in Italy. Paul K. Davis sees its importance as the "Carthaginian defeat ended the attempt to reinforce Hannibal, dooming his effort in Italy, and Rome was able to establish dominance over Spain."

== In literature ==
- Pride of Carthage by David Anthony Durham
- The Histories by Polybius
- The Fortune of Carthage by William Kelso (2012). Covers Hasdrubal's Metaurus campaign from 207 BC.

== See also ==
- Other Hasdrubals in Carthaginian history

== Sources ==
- Barceló, Pedro (2015) [2011]. "Punic Politics, Economy, and Alliances, 218–201". In Hoyos, Dexter (ed.). A Companion to the Punic Wars. Chichester, West Sussex: John Wiley. pp. 357–375. ISBN 978-1119025504.
- Edwell, Peter (2015) [2011]. "War Abroad: Spain, Sicily, Macedon, Africa". In Hoyos, Dexter (ed.). A Companion to the Punic War. Chichester, West Sussex: John Wiley. pp. 320–338. ISBN 978-1119025504.
- Goldsworthy, Adrian (2006). The Fall of Carthage: The Punic Wars 265–146 BC. London: Phoenix. ISBN 978-0304366422.
- Hoyos, Dexter (2005). Hannibal's Dynasty: Power and Politics in the Western Mediterranean, 247–183 BC. New York: Routledge. ISBN 978-0415359580.
- Hoyos, Dexter (2015). Mastering the West: Rome and Carthage at War. Oxford: Oxford University Press. ISBN 978-0199860104.
- Lazenby, John (1998). Hannibal's War: A Military History of the Second Punic War. Warminster: Aris & Phillips. ISBN 978-0856680809.
- Livius, Titus (2006). Hannibal's War: Books Twenty-One to Thirty. Translated by J.C. Yardley, introduction and notes by Dexter Hoyos. Oxford: Oxford University Press. ISBN 0192831593.
- Scullard, Howard H. (1930). Scipio Africanus in the Second Punic War. Cambridge: Cambridge University Press. OCLC 185176196.
- Zimmermann, Klaus (2015) [2011]. "Roman Strategy and Aims in the Second Punic War". In Hoyos, Dexter (ed.). A Companion to the Punic Wars. Oxford: Wiley-Blackwell. pp. 280–298. ISBN 978-1405176002.
