= Gaius Laelius =

Roman general and politician

Gaius Laelius was a Roman general and statesman, and a friend of Scipio Africanus, whom he accompanied on his Iberian campaign (210–206 BC; the Roman Hispania, comprising modern Spain and Portugal) and his African campaign (204–202 BC). His command of the Roman fleet in the attack on New Carthage and command of the Roman cavalry at Zama contributed to Scipio's victories.

== Background ==
According to some Roman historians, including Polybius (Polybius, X, 3), Laelius was a friend of Scipio from childhood; however, his family background is obscure. This obscurity unfortunately extends to how he became acquainted with Scipio in the first place. Livy suggested that he was not from a rich family, since he wanted command of the campaign against Antiochus the Great in 190 BC to repair (or more likely make) his family fortunes.

Polybius suggests that Laelius was a companion of Scipio from their earliest days in the army together, since Laelius was apparently a witness to Scipio's rescue of his father in a skirmish that was probably the Battle of Ticinus in late 218 BC.

Laelius accompanied Scipio on various expeditions from 210 BC to 201 BC but did not begin his political career until after he returned to Rome. This lack of recognition may have been due to his relatively low social status and/or family's lack of wealth and political influence. However, given that the name 'Laelius' only begins to appear with the retelling of the Second Punic War, it may be the case that he (and his family, none of whom are mentioned before this time) is even more lowborn than is assumed.

== Military career: Laelius in Hispania (210–206 BC) ==
In the Iberian campaign, lasting from 210 BC to about 206 BC, Laelius was a loyal second-in-command, the only man to whom Scipio confided the entirety of his plans to take Iberia. He commanded the fleet of thirty ships in the assault on Carthago Nova in 209 BC. Laelius was in charge of some important hostages after the capture of New Carthage, and he was dispatched, along with those hostages, by Scipio to Rome in a quinquereme with the news of this important victory. The Senate gave Laelius further orders for Scipio, which Laelius conveyed back to Scipio while the troops were still in their winter quarters at Tarraco. The time was therefore around early 208 BC.

According to Polybius, Laelius then commanded the left wing of the army, attacking Hasdrubal's right wing, at the Battle of Baecula (near Bailen) in 208 BC, where Scipio inflicted a defeat on Hasdrubal who then retreated to northern Iberia and Italy. The following year was spent consolidating their position, though Scipio sent Silanus to deal with the newest Punic commander in Iberia, and had his younger brother, Lucius, capture Orongis (thought to be modern day Jaen). Laelius' involvement in the events of this year is largely unknown.

Laelius' role in the decisive Battle of Ilipa (206 BC) is similarly unclear. In its direct aftermath, though, he was dispatched to convince the Berber (or Masaesylian) king Syphax to renew his allegiances to Rome, but failed, owing to the king's refusal to ratify any treaty except with Scipio himself; accordingly, Scipio went personally to the Masaesylian court to secure the alliance. Shortly after this diplomatic success, Gades showed discontent with Carthaginian rule, and, catching word of this, Scipio sent Laelius by sea and Marcius by land to capture the city. On the way, the city's defectors were apprehended but the squadron on which they were to be deported to Africa was defeated by Laelius at Battle of Carteia. The Romans were then troubled by a rebellion among the soldiers and insurrections among the local tribes in late 206 BC when Scipio fell ill. Laelius's role during the insurrection is not clear, but he is noted as having commanded Africanus' cavalry when the latter marched to subdue the Ilergetean revolt.

== Laelius in Africa (204–202 BC) ==
In Scipio's consulship year (205 BC), Laelius went with him to his designated province, Sicily, where he conducted an expedition or raid to northern Africa while Scipio was readying his troops and supplies for a full-scale invasion. The purpose of this expedition was to assess the situation in Africa. Both princes having previously been won over, Syphax broke his alliance with Scipio and joined the Carthaginians when he was offered a marriage alliance with Sophonisba, a famous Carthaginian beauty, the daughter of Hasdrubal Gisco. Subsequently, Syphax drove his bride's former fiance, Masinissa—who remained loyal to Scipio, having confirmed an alliance with him shortly after the battle of Ilipa—out of his own territories. Masinissa, now effectively a fugitive, came to Laelius during his raid, thought to be in the area of Hippo Regius, to apprise him of his circumstances. Laelius was then able to convey the urgency of the invasion to Scipio.

In about 204 BC, Scipio was ready to invade Africa. After several skirmishes, and a period of contrived truce, the Romans assaulted the allied camps at the Battle of Utica in which Laelius set fire to the Numidian (Syphax) camp and Scipio to the Carthaginian (Hasdrubal Gisco) camp. The Romans nevertheless failed to detach Syphax from his marital and political alliance with the Carthaginians; nor was a complete victory possible over the Carthaginian army, with Scipio fearing for his fleet.

After the Battle of Utica Scipio sent Laelius with Masinissa to help the Numidian prince regain the leadership of his tribe the Maesulii. At the Battle of Cirta they fought king Syphax of the Masaesyli, who stood between Masinissa and his rule (Syphax having supported Masinissa's rival Mazaetullus); initially Syphax gained the upper hand on Masinissa and his horsemen (outnumbering his opponent), but Laelius sent his velites to reinforce Masanissa and advanced with the Roman heavy infantry, thus breaking the enemies morale; after a short resistance they fled abandoning their king. Syphax was defeated and taken prisoner. They then marched on Cirta, Syphax's capital, and took it and his Syphax's wife Sophonisba (a daughter of Hasdrubal Gisco). Masinissa took Sophonisba as a wife, something Laelius criticized him for (Scipio later annulled the marriage – claiming Sophonisba as a prisoner of war). They returned to Scipio's camp within 15 days after they had set out.

After he returned from campaigning with Masinissa Laelius was sent to Rome to bring the news of their victories to the people and give an account of the African campaign to the Senate. He returned to Africa before the start of the 202 BC campaigning season to serve as Scipio's quaestor.

At Zama (202 BC) Laelius was in command of the Roman and Italian cavalry on the left wing with Masinissa and the Numidian cavalry on the right wing; During the battle part of the Carthaginian war elephants charged towards Laelius's cavalry but were repulsed with javelins, the elephants flight took them through the Carthaginian right wing cavalry, seeing his opponent's line in disarray Laelius launched his attack, routed the Carthaginian cavalry and pursued them from the field. After chasing them for a while Laelius regrouped his cavalry and returned to the battle proper. Meanwhile Masanissa had won a similar action on the right, had also regouped and returned to the main battle. Scipio, in command of the infantry, had defeated Hannibal's first and second line and was now fighting Hannibal's third line (his veterans). Masinissa and Laelius attacked Hannibal from the rear. Caught between Scipio's infantry and Laelius and Masinissa's cavalry Hannibal's veterans broke and fled. Without Laelius and Masinissa's actions Scipio may well have been defeated.

After the Battle of Zama Laelius was sent to Rome to bring the people and the Senate news of their victory. He also conducted Syphax and his son Vermina, who was captured after Zama, and some other important prisoners to Rome.

== Political career ==
Laelius was elected quaestor after Scipio's decisive victory in 202 BC. In 197 BC, he was elected plebeian aedile and in 196 BC made praetor of Sicily, both times apparently with the aid of his former commander and old friend. Scipio's influence, however, did not serve to win Laelius the consulship in 192 BC. Finally, in 190, he was elected consul along with Scipio's younger brother Scipio Asiaticus but failed to win leadership of the campaign against Antiochus III the Great, which would have enriched him. One version has Laelius himself nobly offering the Senate the choice instead of the traditional drawing of lots to decide the allocation of provinces. When his friend Scipio Africanus announced that, if his brother Lucius was chosen to lead the campaign against Antiochus, he would accompany his brother as a legate, the decision was inevitable - Lucius would be preferred. Laelius's decision, if this version is correct, was a triumph of friendship, but not for his personal finances.

He was given Gaul as his province, and was employed in organizing the recently conquered territory in Cisalpine Gaul. Placentia and Cremona were repopulated.

== Later life ==
Like other superannuated Roman generals, Laelius later served on embassies to King Perseus of Macedon (174-173 BC) and to Transalpine Gaul (170 BC).

Laelius's wife is not known, but c. 188 BC, he fathered a legitimate son who would become consul in 140 BC - Gaius Laelius Sapiens. His son's relationship with Scipio Aemilianus would, in many ways, mirror Laelius the Elder's own friendship with Scipio Africanus, Laelius the Younger fighting in the Third Punic War as Aemilianus' subordinate, and being his political ally and client as well, as part of the Scipionic Circle.

It was also in 160 BC, when the aged Laelius (probably then in his mid-seventies) met the author Polybius in Rome during his last years, and gave him much first-hand information about Scipio Africanus. Polybius was a client of Scipio's brother-in-law Lucius Aemilius Paullus Macedonicus (who died suddenly in the same year, 160 BC), and became a friend to both his sons, notably Scipio Aemilianus (Africanus's adoptive grandson).

Laelius appears to have died some years after 160 BC, but his year of death is mentioned by neither Livy nor Polybius.

== In popular culture ==
As a relatively minor figure in Roman history, media does not portray much of Gaius Laelius. George Handel's opera Scipione, about the romantic episode 'the Continence of Scipio', is one of the few cases. It has Laelius (Italianised to 'Lelio') assume, in addition to his historic role as Scipio's subordinate, an intermediary role between the Iberian princess Berenice and his friend, along with providing him with his own love interest.

Recently, however, he has had a fairly prominent, albeit largely negative, role in Ross Leckie's Scipio and a minor role (though comparatively large next to the remainder of the Roman cast) in David Anthony Durham's Pride of Carthage. A self-published book Imperator: Italia by Erich 'B' Hartmann, presumably part of a trilogy or series, has Laelius as a second narrator charting events of the Second Punic War while he converses (or recollects) with the first narrator, Polybius, who is collecting materials for his eponymous Histories.

Political offices
| Preceded by P. Cornelius Scipio Nasica; M' Acilius Glabrio | Roman consul 190 BC; With: Scipio Asiaticus | Succeeded by M. Fulvius Nobilior; Gn. Manlius Vulso |
