= Archobarzane =

Last ruler of the kingdom of the Masaesyli

King of the Masaesyli
- Reign: c. ? – c. 175 BC
- Predecessor: Vermina
- Successor: office abolished Massinissa as sole king
- Died: after 175 BC
- Father: Vermina
- Military career
- Allegiance: Masaesyli
- Conflicts: Second Punic War: Battle of Zama possibly

Archobarzane, grandson of Syphax, was the last king of the Masaesylians, after his father Vermina.

Contrary to his father, who sought peace with the Romans after the Second Punic War, Archobarzane seems to have been in favor of Carthage. His kingdom was therefore annexed by Massinissa around 157 BC, with the blessing of Rome.
