= Aylimas =

- King of the Massylii and Masaesyli

King of Numidia
- Reign: ?–310 BC
- Predecessor: Iles (?)
- Successor: Agathocles (brief control); Niptasan
- Died: 310 BC; Numidia
- Dynasty: Massyli
- Father: Iles
- Religion: Libyan religion

Aylimas (Berber: ⴰⵢⵍⵉⵎⴰⵙ (Aylimas)) was a Numidian king born around 350 BC. He is believed to be the son of king Iles and the brother of both Niptasan and Zelalsan II which would make him an ancestor of king Massinissa.

== Biography ==
The only source that mentions this king is Diodorus Siculus, when he recounts the campaign of the Syracusan tyrant Agathocles of Syracuse, who sought to emulate Alexander the Great in his conquests. Agathocles declared war on Carthage and landed in Africa in 310 BC at Cape Tayyib. He invaded the city of Neapolis near Nabes in Tunisia, then besieged the cities of Hadromit and Tapsus near Susa in Tunisia. Here, he refers to King Aylimas, who is described as the king of the Libyans not subject to Carthaginian authority. His kingdom was located west of Carthaginian territory, roughly from the center of Tunisia westward to eastern Algeria, thus corresponding to eastern Numidia and the Massyliian realm.

Agathocles allied himself with King Aylimas against Carthage, but the alliance did not last long for unknown reasons. However, it is highly probable that Aylimas knew there was no point in getting rid of one foreigner only to replace him with another, and Aylimas turned against Agathocles. The latter invaded the Massyliian lands under his control, and King Aylimas was killed in one of the battles. Then Eumachus invaded the Numidian city of Tokkai (in western Tunisia), which was mentioned as a large and prosperous city. It would remain one of the most important Numidian cities even after the unification of the kingdom in 202 BC, It was there that the mausoleum of King Masinissa, built for him by his son King Micipsa in the 2nd century BC, was built.

According to Gabriel Camps, The city of Tokkai seized in 308–307 BC by Eumachus, a lieutenant of Agathocles, and described as being of considerable size (Diodorus, XX, 57) can, in all likelihood, be identified as Dougga (Thugga). It is therefore not impossible that Dougga—the importance of which during the Numidian period cannot be denied likely served as one of the strongholds of King Ailymas.

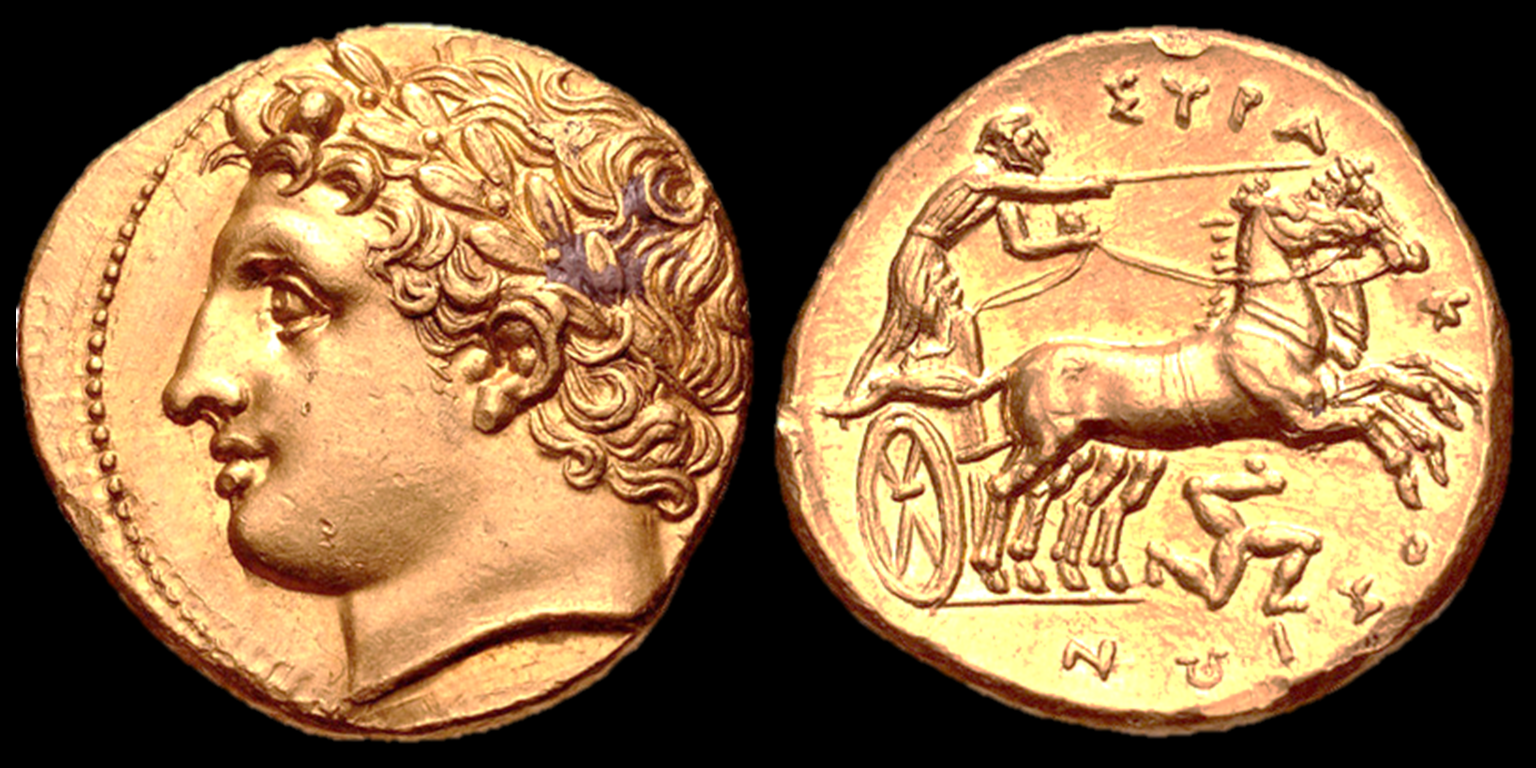
After defeating Aylimas, Agathocles retained the Numidian cavalry and used horse-drawn Numidian chariots in his wars meaning that he kept influence in Numidia until he left, despite that no sources show if he claimed kingship there.

After the death of King Aylimas, the source indicates that Agathocles retained the Numidian cavalry and used horse-drawn Numidian chariots in his wars, suggesting that Aylimas's army was well-organized and sophisticated but also that he kept Aylimas's territory for a few years. However, Agathocles was forced to retreat to Sicily to confront his rivals for power and make peace with Carthage.

After Agathocles's retreat, his kingdom is believed to have been inherited by his brother Niptasan.

According to some accounts, he was originally the leader of the Massylii or the king of the group. He then managed to conquer the kingdom of the Masaesyli. He is thus mentioned as a distant predecessor of Syphax.

== Link to the Massylii ==
Gabriel Camps emits the hypothesis that Aylimas might belong to the same dynasty as Masinissa. He cannot, in fact, have been merely a tribal chief; Diodorus consistently refers to him as "King of the Libyans." Subsequent events provide some insight into the rules of succession within the Numidian kingdom, where power was transmitted to the eldest agnate.
