= Royal Mausoleum of Syphax =

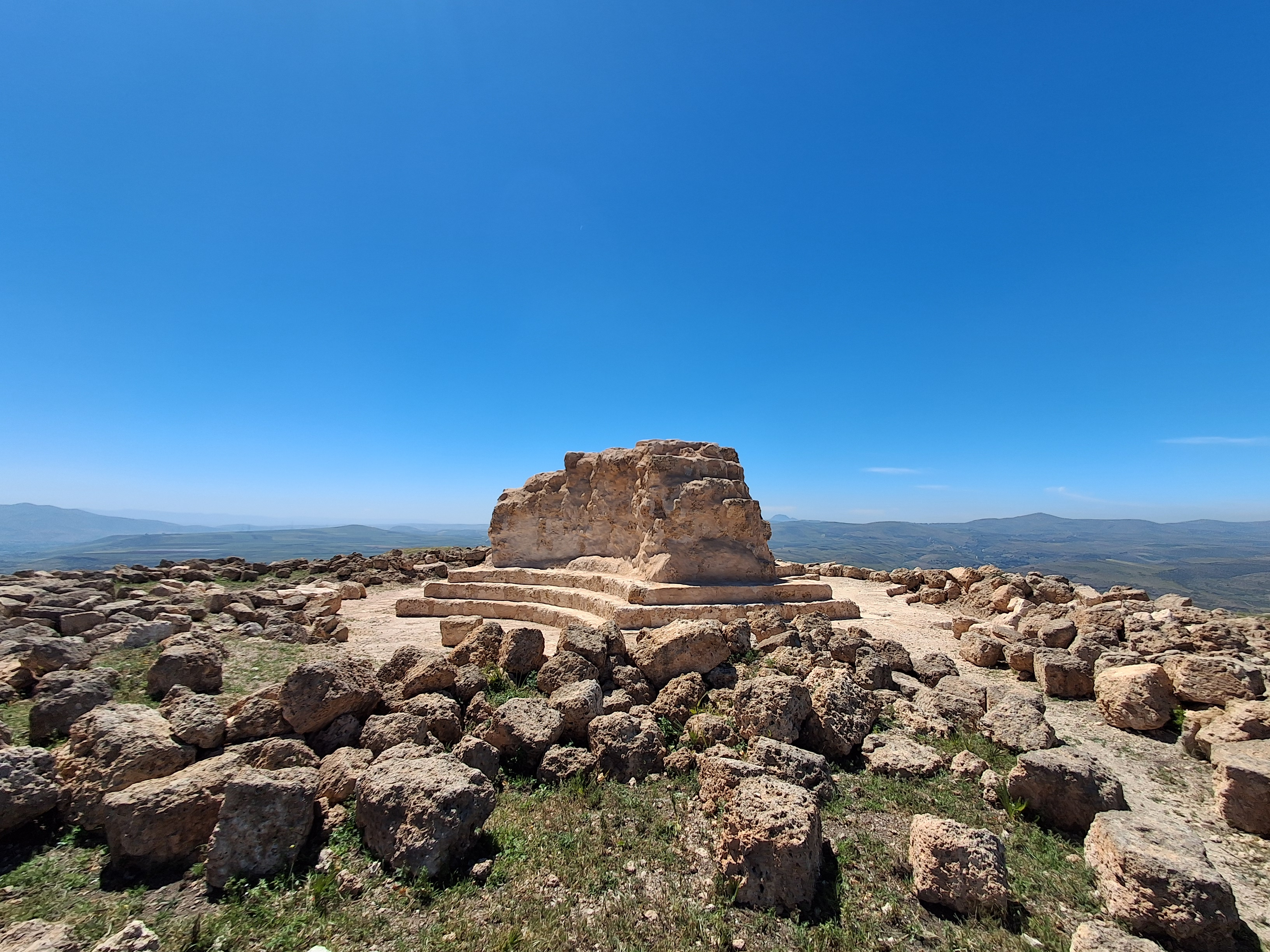
- Mausoleum of Syphax

- Location within Algeria
- 35.2630°N 1.4310°W
- Location: Ain Temouchent Province, Algeria

History
- Built: 3 BC

Site notes
- Architectural style: Royal Numidian Architecture

The Royal Mausoleum of Syphax is a funerary monument located 12 km southwest of Beni Saf in Ain Temouchent Province, Algeria. The mausoleum is the tomb where the Berber King Syphax, sovereigns of Masaesyli, were allegedly buried. However, their human remains are no longer at the site.

It is a funerary monument dating from the end of the 2nd century BC, located more precisely on one of the peaks of Skouna mountain (altitude 221 m), on the right bank of the Tafna, where it overlooks the site of ancient Siga, capital of the Massaesyle king Syphax.

This is a tower-shaped mausoleum with a plan similar to that of Mausoleum B at Sabratha and that of Henchir Bourgou at Djerba, with its succession of alternating concave and rectilinear facades, although it displays a simpler Hellenistic formal vocabulary and larger dimensions. Likewise, its height must have reached at least 30 meters, making it the most imposing of the tower-shaped monuments in North Africa. Furthermore, it is the only one of these mausoleums to feature, beneath the paving that borders it, a series of underground chambers.

The mausoleum has also been included on the UNESCO World Heritage List since 2002 under the heading "Royal Mausoleums of Numidia, Mauretania and Pre-Islamic Funerary Monuments" for criteria (ii)(iii)(iv).

== Discovery ==
The monument was excavated and partially excavated by Gustave Vuillemot in the early sixties. It was then the subject of an excavation campaign by an Algerian-German team led by Mounir Bouchenaki and Friedrich Rakob during the summer of 1976. Before these excavation campaigns, it was buried under a voluminous pile of earth and stones that the inhabitants of the region referred to as Kerkour el Aiers, i.e. "the Butte of Marriages". Indeed, a local tradition wanted the newlyweds and their wedding processions to go around the mound several times to ensure the fidelity of their future wives

== History ==
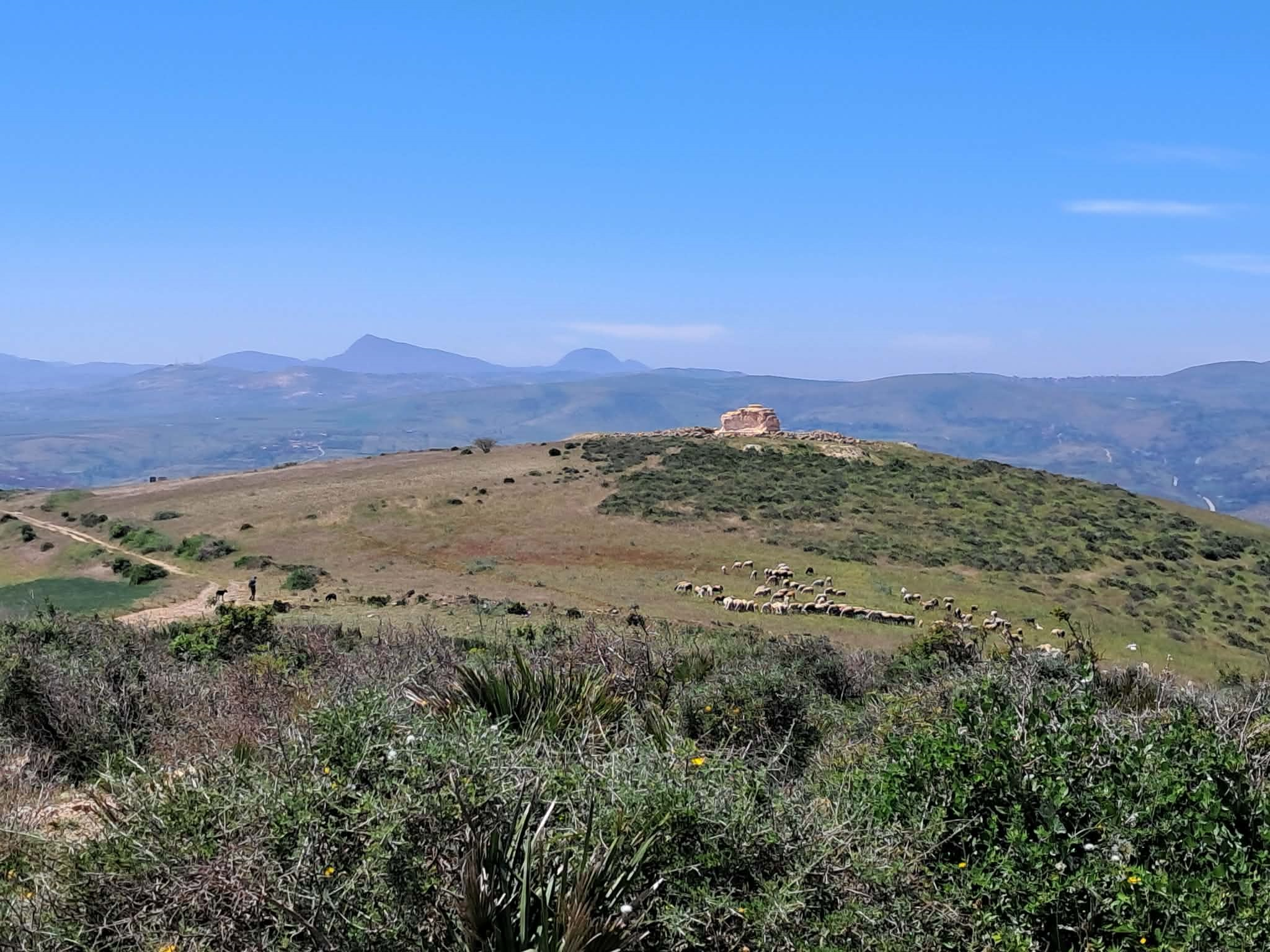
Royal Mausoleum of Syphax at the top of Mount Skouna, Algeria.

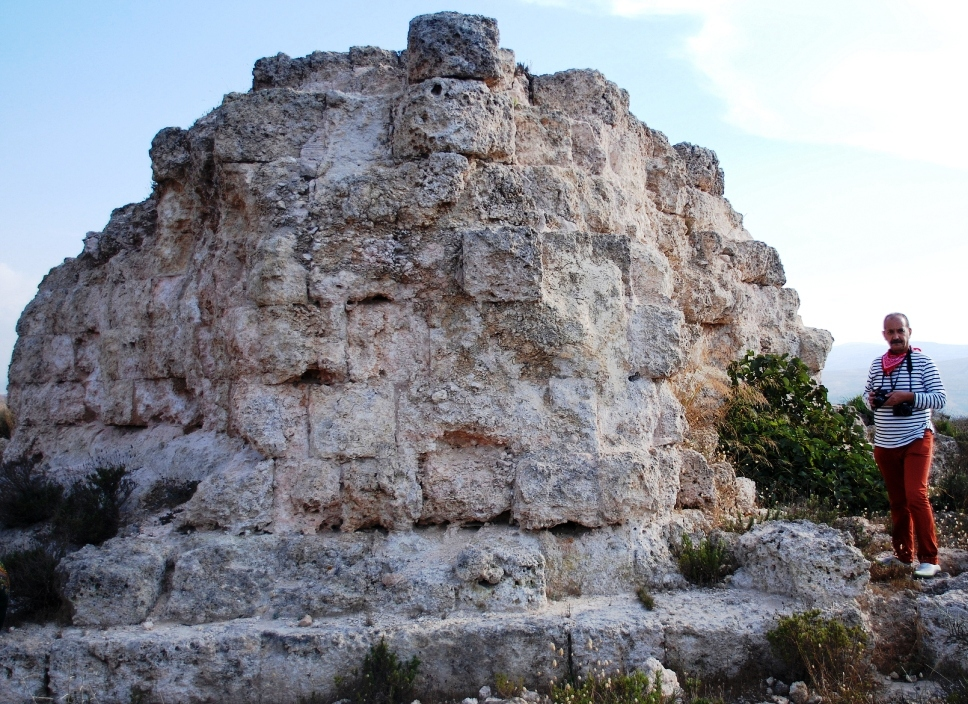
Royal Mausoleum of Syphax (old pic).

The monument was hypothetically attributed by Friedrich Rakob and Gustave Vuillemot to Syphax's son, Vermina, who ruled for a time over what remained of his father's kingdom after the defeat at the Battle of the Great Plains in 203. Jean-Pierre Laporte also points out that the monument cannot have been used as a burial place for King Syphax himself, since he died a captive in Italy and was buried there at the expense of the Republic. Gabriel Camps, based on the unlooted remains of the furniture discovered on site, proposes the end of the second century BC. which historically corresponds to the end of the reign of the Massylian king Micipsa. What seems certain, however, is that the monument was the subject of voluntary destruction shortly after its construction, possibly in connection with a dynastic change and in particular the annexation of the western part of the Numidian kingdom by Bocchus 108-106 B.C. A significant point that reinforces this last chronological hypothesis is that of the many similarities shared between this mausoleum and the royal mausoleum of Mauretania located near the ancient site of Tipasa. Indeed, the corridor leading to the central chamber of the latter is also built in a semicircular vault, we also find at the level of the walls, four courses on which radiating keystones, a portcullis closure, tiers on which the outer drum rests with a paving around it, half-columns supporting a moulded cornice with a groove, here again the Ionic order and finally a mortar of plaster for the joining of rubble stones; We are therefore probably facing the same architect or the same school. Gabriel Camps and Virginie Bridoux sees it rather as a mausoleum intended for Micipsa and not Syphax.

== See also ==
- List of cultural assets of Algeria
- Syphax
- Siga
