= Siga =

Berber and Roman port near Aïn Témouchent, Algeria

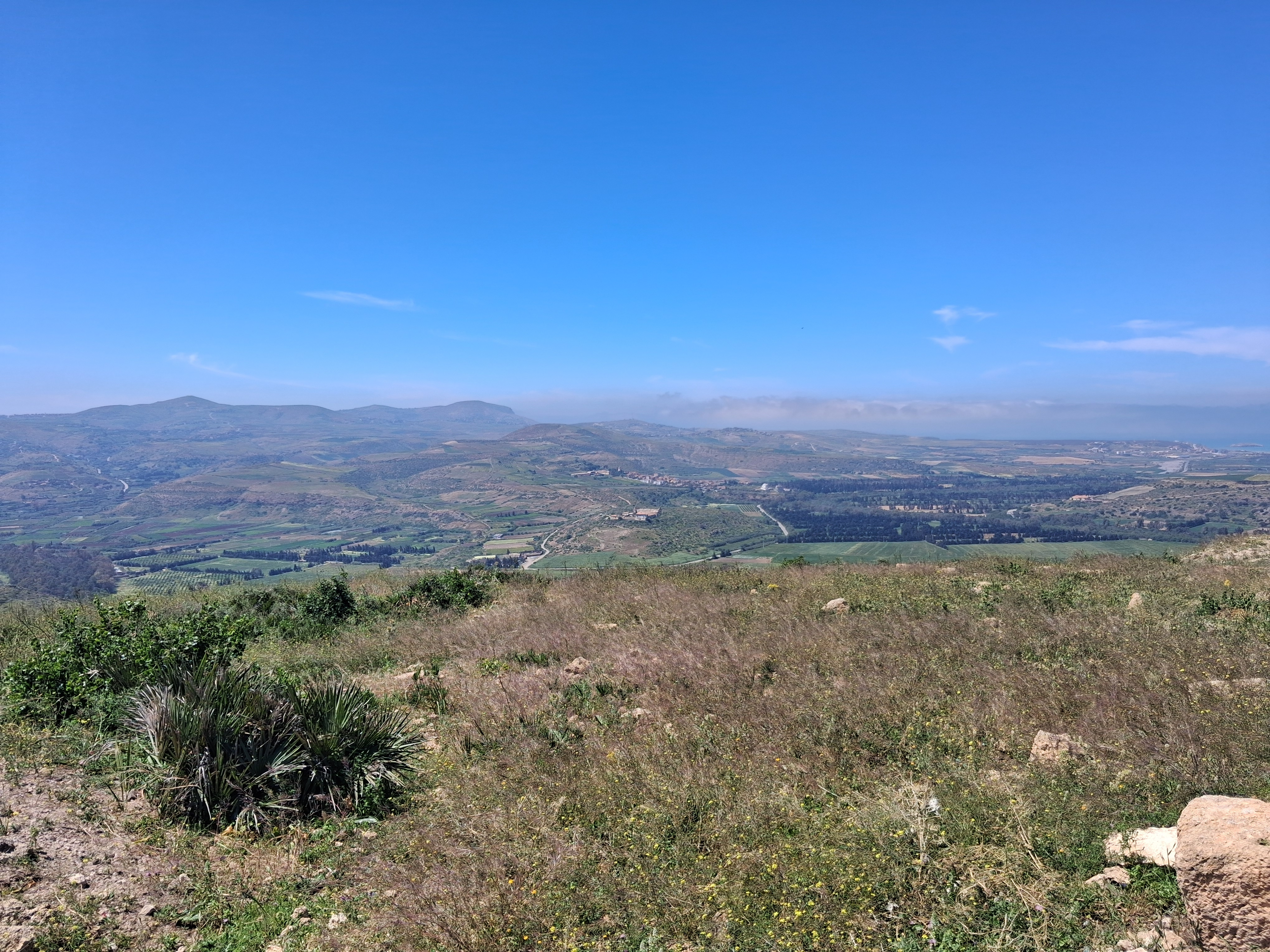
- General view of Siga from Skouna Mountain

- Location within Algeria
- 35.2663°N 1.4499°W
- Location: Algeria
- Region: Aïn Témouchent Province

Siga was a Berber, Phoenician and Roman port located near what is now Aïn Témouchent, Algeria. It was the capital of Masaesyli Kingdom and major city of Kingdom of Numidia after. Under the Roman Empire, it was part of western Mauretania Caesariensis, bordering Mauretania Tingitana.

== History ==
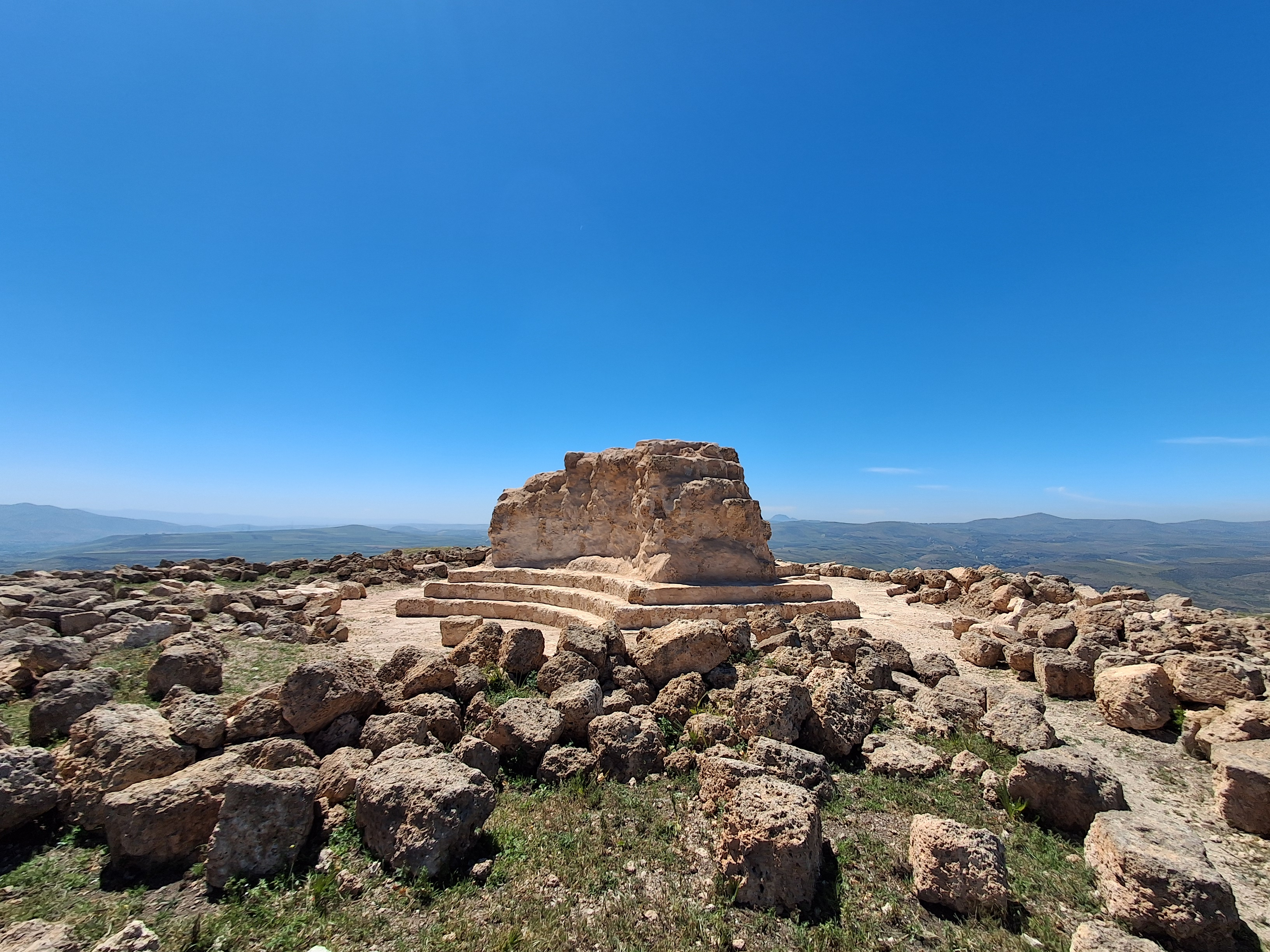
The Royal Mausoleum of Syphax

Siga was a major Mediterranean port in the ancient Kingdom of Numidia. It was located at the western border of the territory of the Masaesyli, a Berber tribe. Their traditional opponents were the Berber confederation of the Maesulians, who ruled the eastern portion.

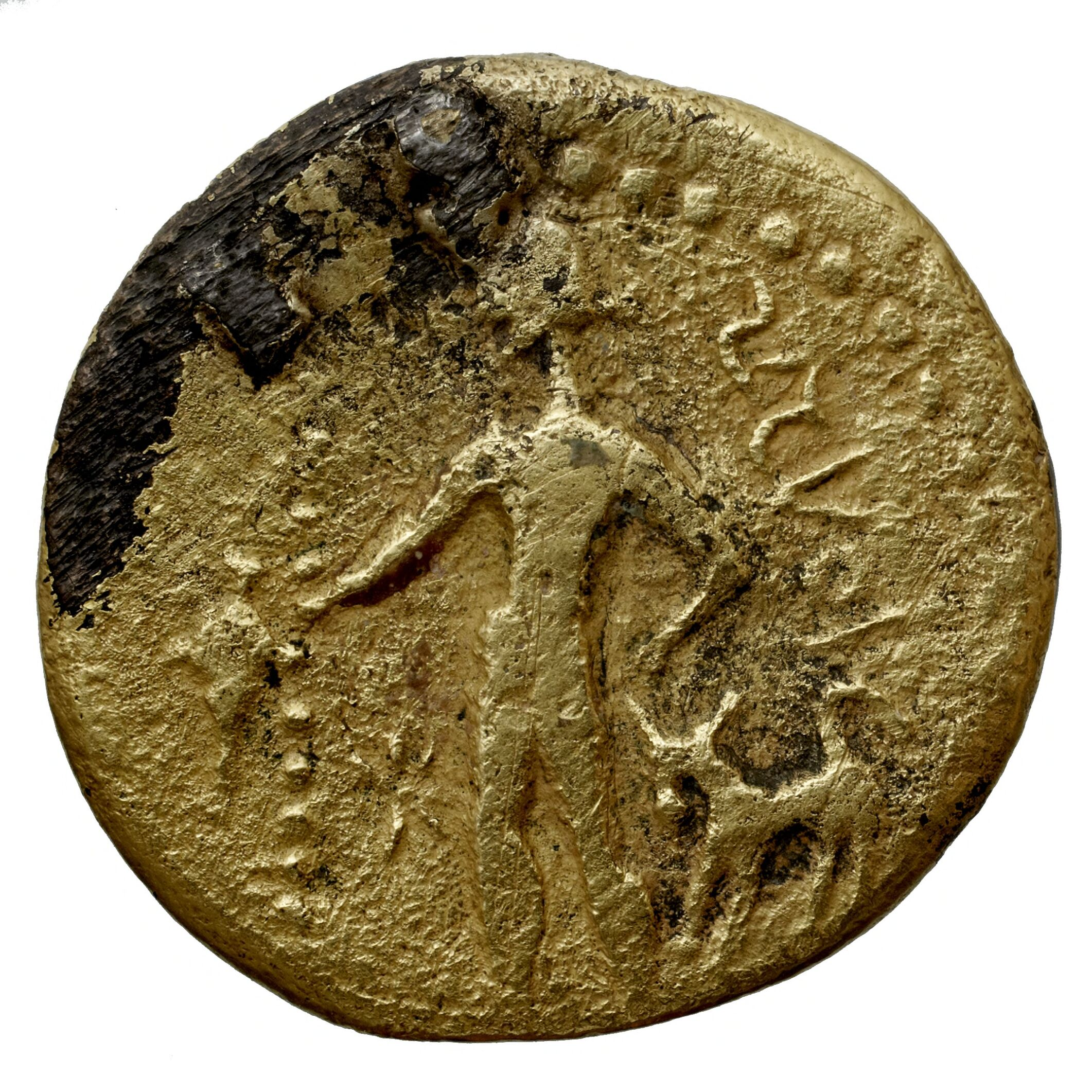
A coin of Siga with a Punic legend šygʿn

In the course of the Second Punic War, King Syphax of the Masaesyli allied himself with the Roman Republic and the armies led by Scipio Africanus, while the Maesulians ruled by Masinissa sided with Carthage. With the defeat and capture of Syphax by Masinissa, the western tribes were conquered and gradually absorbed into a united kingdom under his rule. His successors minted coins at Siga with Punic script, in which its name appears as Shigan (𐤔𐤉𐤂𐤏𐤍, šygʿn).

Some remains of buildings (of Siga) can be seen on a hill with a flat top in the lower valley of the Tafna at a bend of the river. A milestone found nearby names the site... A part of a necropolis on the plain has produced material of the 1st to 3d c. AD.

After a temporary decline, the city got some importance inside the Roman Africa, especially with African emperors Septimius Severus and Caracalla. With the Arab conquest, during the second half of the seventh century, disappeared all references to Siga in documented history.

Number of visible or hidden monuments extend on both banks of the river Tafna (called "Siga" in Roman times) including the famous "Numidian mausoleum", the fortified acropolis and some Roman hydraulic and thermal facilities.

== Religion ==
The current Roman Catholic titular see of "Sigus" is probably based on this location, but there was another Sigus in western Numidia.

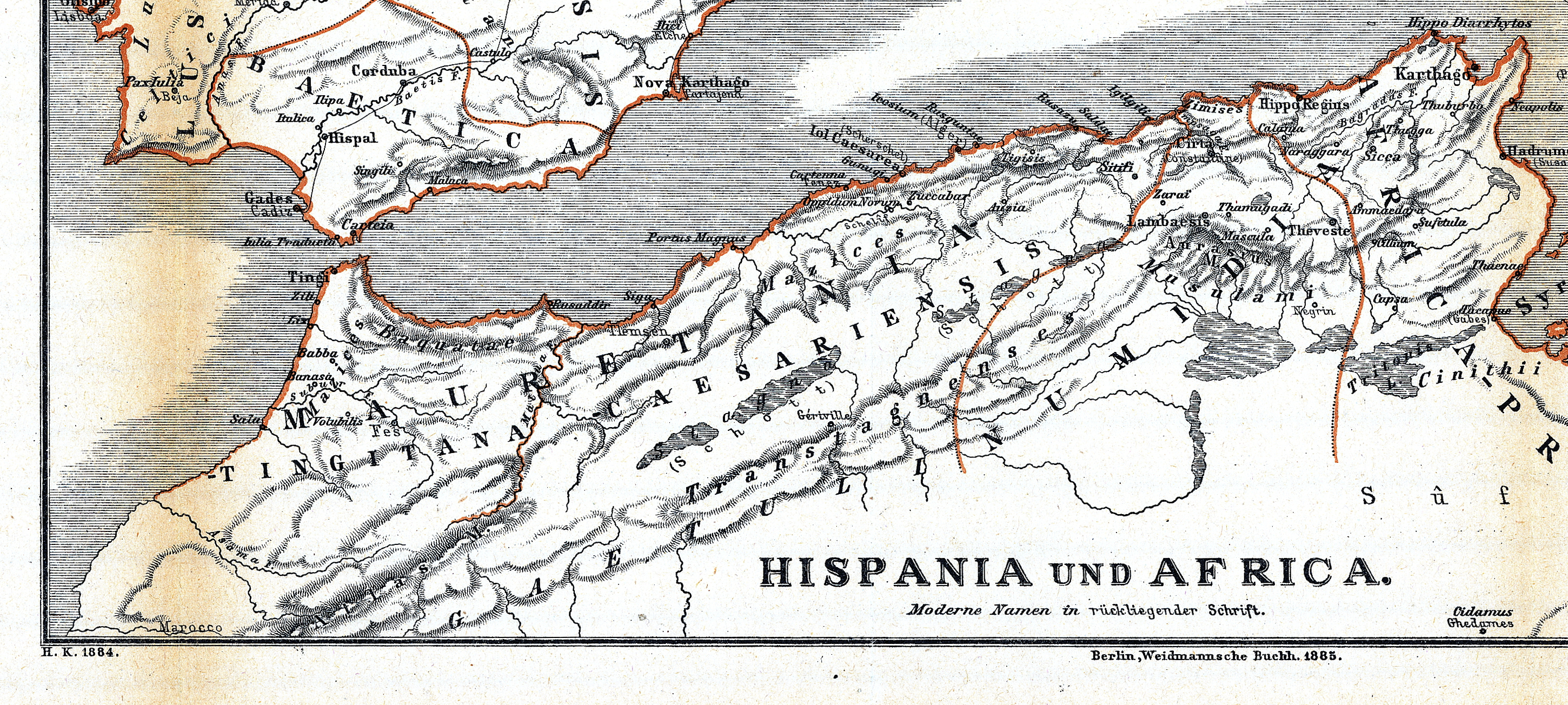
Map showing Siga east of Rusaddir

== See also ==
- Altava
- Mauretania Caesariensis
- Rapidum
- Rusaddir
- Tlemcen
