= Craige B. Champion =

American historian and classical scholar

Craige B. Champion (born June 30, 1956) is an American historian and classical scholar. He has been Professor of Ancient History at Syracuse University (Maxwell School of Citizenship and Public Affairs) since 2017.

== Career ==
Craige B. Champion was born on June 30, 1956. He earned a B.A. (summa cum laude) from the College of New Jersey (1984), and a M.A. from Princeton University (1989), then completed a Ph.D. at that institution in 1993. Champion also studied Greek and Latin at the City University of New York's Summer Latin/Greek Institute in 1984 and 1986.

He taught at Princeton University (1990, 1992), College of New Jersey (1991–1992), Lewis School and Diagnostic Center (1992–1993), Rutgers University (1993), Reed College (1993–1995), Allegheny College (1995–2001), and Syracuse University (since 2001).

His research focuses on Greek and Roman historiography, elite religious practices in antiquity, and imperialism and citizenship in the ancient world. His first book, Cultural Politics in Polybius's Histories, was published in 2004, and looks at the life and work of the ancient Greek historian Polybius. It was reviewed by the Bryn Mawr Classical Review as a "truly original" and "invaluable" contribution. The Canadian Journal of History described Champion's book as a "remarkable achievement" and "enormous accomplishment" on Greek historiography. Champion is a recipient of the Thoburn Foundation Award and the Daniel Patrick Moynihan Award.

== Selected works ==
- Cultural Politics in Polybius's Histories (2004)
- (Editor) Roman Imperialism: Readings and Sources (2004)
