= Vermina =

Vermina ⴼⵉⵔⵎⵉⵏⴰ
- Agellid of Western Numidia
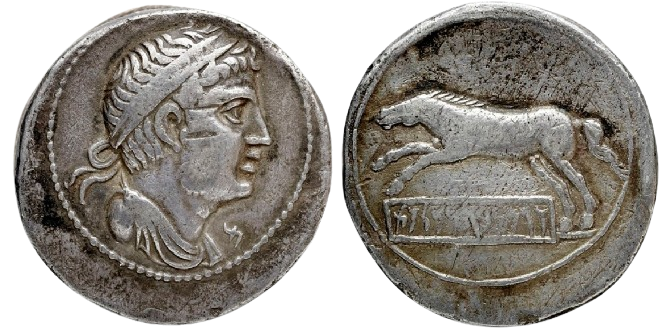
- Silver tetradrachm of Vermina, on the left Vermina facind right, Phoenician letter M, on the right a galloping horse and the Phoenician WRMND HMMLKT, "Vermina the king"

King of the Masaesyli
- Reign: c. 203 – c. ? BC
- Predecessor: Syphax
- Successor: Archobarzane
- Died: before 175 BC
- Burial: Royal Mausoleum of Syphax (?)
- Issue: Archobarzane
- Father: Syphax
- Military career
- Allegiance: Masaesyli
- Conflicts: Second Punic War: Battle of Zama

Vermina (Punic: 𐤅𐤓𐤌𐤍𐤃, wrmnd) was the son of king Syphax and king of the Masaesylian Berbers, a Berber tribe of western Numidia, an ancient Berber kingdom in North Africa.

In 203 BC, at the Battle of the Great Plains, the Numidian and Roman armies of Massinissa defeated the coalition of Syphax and the Carthaginians. After the defeat and the capture of his father, Vermina remained loyal to the Carthaginians. He joined Hannibal shortly after his arrival in Africa, but did not directly participate in the Battle of Zama (202 BC): arriving late, well after the battle, at the head of a considerable army, he was attacked and defeated by the Romans, who inflicted heavy losses upon him, his forces only arrived to assist Hannibal after his defeat at the Battle of Zama, leading Vermina's army to be defeated by the Romans, it is said that about 15,000 men perished and 12,000 were taken as prisoners. While Vermina escaped this battle, he was forced to sue for peace with the Romans in 200 BC.

Vermina's territories, corresponding to western Numidia, soon fell under Massinissa's control; Numidia was thus unified. Vermina was therefore almost the last Masaesylian king, yet his son, Archobarzane would soon declare himself king and try to avenge his father.
