= Masaesyli =

Historic ethnic group

Masaesyli Masaesyli Kingdom Μασαισύλιοι Masaisylioi
- 4th century BC–175 BC
- Map of Masaesyli (with Massylii in east), 220 BC during the reign of Syphax.
- Capital: Siga; Cirta
- Official languages: Punic (Note: Punic and Neo-Punic was especially dominant during the early era of the Numidian kingdom. Several official Punic inscriptions survive, and Numidian coins were minted in Punic at first, likely because it was the most influential language when it came to trade in the area. Some historians even consider it the official language of Numidia during its early/mid eras.)
- Common languages: Numidian (Note: Used especially in funerary and votive steles, with a few surviving "official" royal inscriptions.); Latin (Note: During the later eras of Numidia, Latin started replacing Punic as the dominant secondary language inside Numidia. Coins were minted in Latin, and inscriptions in Latin began appearing, however, many of those Latin inscriptions may have been from the Roman era itself); Greek (Note: Greek first appeared in the region through trade routes opened up by Massinissa, and gained traction and influence by the end of the kingdom when the Numidian dynasty intermarried and mixed with the Ptolemaic dynasty.)
- Religion: Numitheism; Punic religion
- Government: Monarchy
- King
  - 344 –310 BC: Aylimas (?)
  - ? –175 BC: Archobarzane
- Historical era: Antiquity
  - Established: 4th century BC
  - Annexed by Numidia: 175 BC
| Preceded by | Succeeded by |
| Ancient Carthage | Numidia (Roman province); Mauretania |
- Today part of: Algeria

The Massaesylii [mas.sae̯ˈsyː.liː]; (Neo-Punic: 𐤌𐤔𐤔𐤋𐤉𐤉𐤌, mššlyym; Ancient Greek: Μασαισύλιοι, romanized: Masaisylioi; also Masaesyli) were a Berber confederate kingdom of western Numidia (central and western Algeria) and the main antagonists of the Massylii in eastern Numidia. The kingdom of Massaesylia extended all the way west to Mulucha river and under Syphax its authority extended to the Strait of Gibraltar.

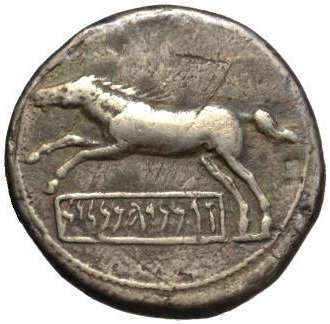
Coin of Vermina, King of Masaesyli, c. 200 BC. Depicts a galloping horse and the Phoenician text WRMNDH MMLKT, "Vermina the king."

During the Second Punic War the Massaesylii initially supported the Roman Republic and were led by the king Syphax against the Massylii, who were led by Masinissa, as an ally of the Carthaginian Republic. After Masinissa and the Massylii switched sides to Rome, the Massaesylii turned against Rome and allied with Hasdrubal Gisco. Syphax was defeated, however, and spent the remainder of his days in Roman captivity, while his kingdom was assimilated into the kingdom of Masinissa.

== History ==
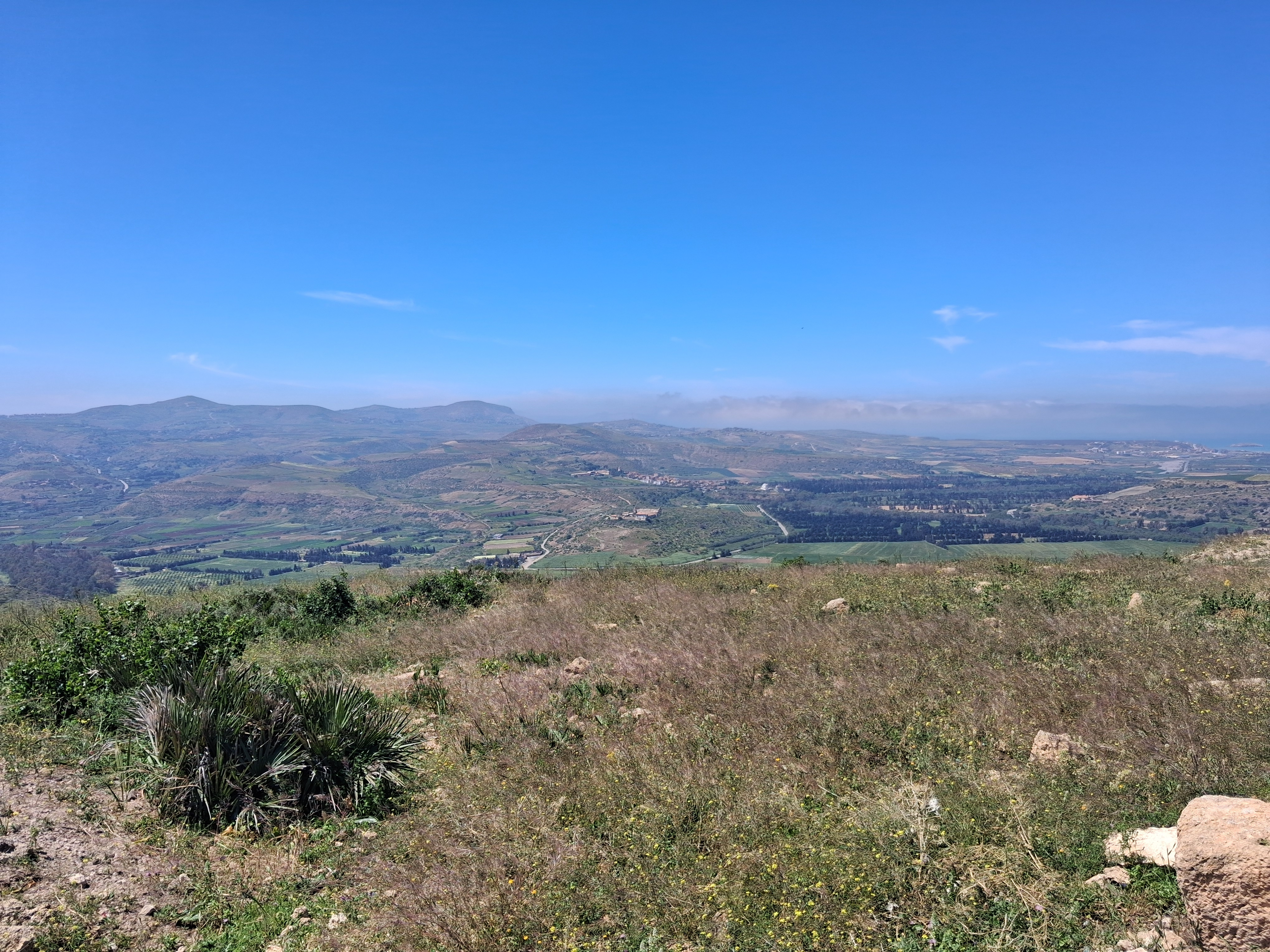
General view of Siga from Skouna Mountain

Greek geographer and historian Strabo (c. 63 BC – 23 AD), informs us that the "territory of the Maurii" is followed by that of the Massæsyles, which begins at the river Molochath and ends at Cape Tritonis; the river in question could be the Moulouya, the cape probably refers to Cape Bougaroun. The Massæsyles occupied two-thirds of Algeria and eastern Morocco.

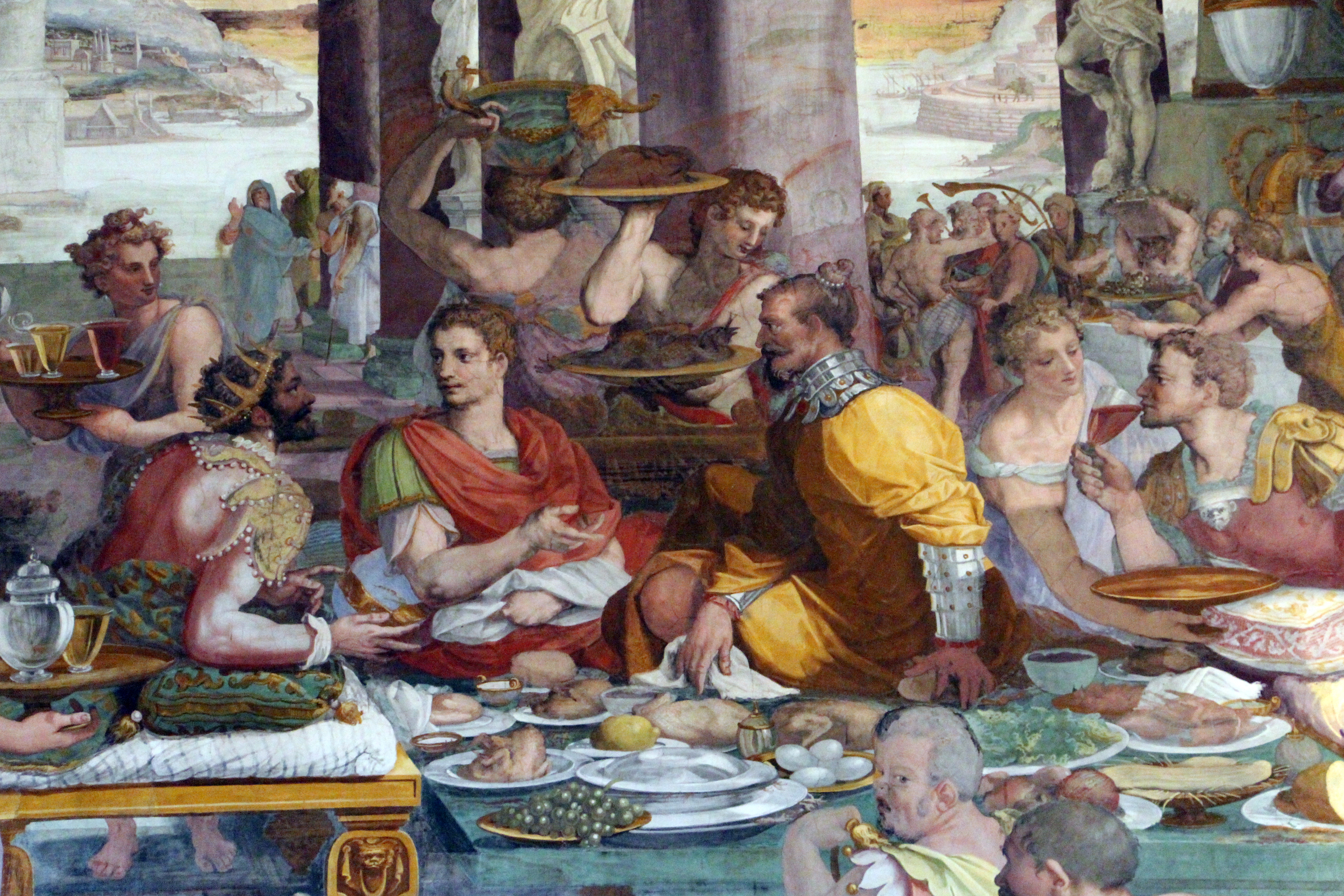
King Syphax of Western Numidia receives Scipio Africanus - Allori Alessandro (1535–1607) - sala di Leone X, Villa Medicea Ambra, Poggio a Caiano.

The capital of eastern Numidia was Siga (situated in Oulhaça El Gheraba Commune) whose first sovereign was Syphax. Siga was then the best place to be the capital of the Massæsylian kingdom, it was indeed there that the sovereign had an interest in the affairs of Iberia and the west of the country and it was also there that Syphax received in 206 BC, the Roman general and statesman Scipio and the Carthaginian general Hasdrubal Gisco.

Many Syphax coins have been found in Siga and it seems that at that time only the king could mint money. The two coin series with the effigy of Syphax and his son Vermina show the king wearing a diadem each time. Syphax would therefore have been at the head of the tribes of Orania and it was from this western province, the most flourishing, that he drew money and soldiers. He is the first Berber chief who has absolute powers of a sovereign king and the first who had money minted in the region. A powerful ruler, the wearing of the diadem made him god like.

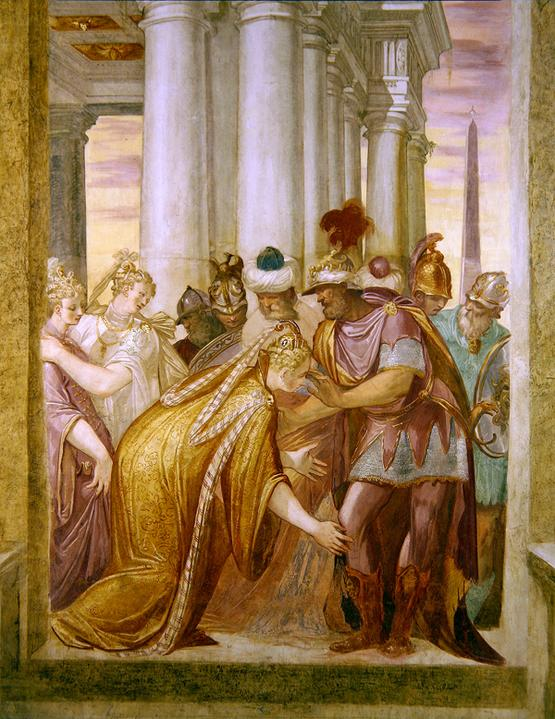
Sophonisba demanding aid of Massinissa, 16th century, by Giovanni Battista Zelotti.

Although married to Sophonisba, a Carthaginian princess, he was very independent in regard to his wife's country Ancient Carthage. The two great powers of the Eastern Mediterranean Rome And Carthage were disputing alliance with Massaesylia; Syphax meeting with Scipio and Hasdrubal Gisco made Massaesylia a third power, one that dominated in the western Mediterranean.

Recent excavations have shown the importance of Punic sites, in the island of Rachgoun, in Mersa Madakh, in Bethioua, in Guelta, in Gouraya Sidi Brahim, and also that of the coastal cities which were the outlets and economic centers of Massæsylia. An active Mediterranean trade had been established between Almeria and western Algeria. Pottery and metal products arrived from Spain, while Algeria exported ivory and ostrich eggshells.

No doubt majority of trading posts were autonomous; other trading posts entirely dependent on Carthage and the aguellid (Tamazight for King). It is certain that Portus Sigensis ("port of Siga", at the mouth of the Tafna) belonged entirely to Syphax. There have been vast interior cities controlled absolutely by the kingdom of Syphax; shards of pottery, near El-Asnam, and a coin in the Dahra would suggest so.

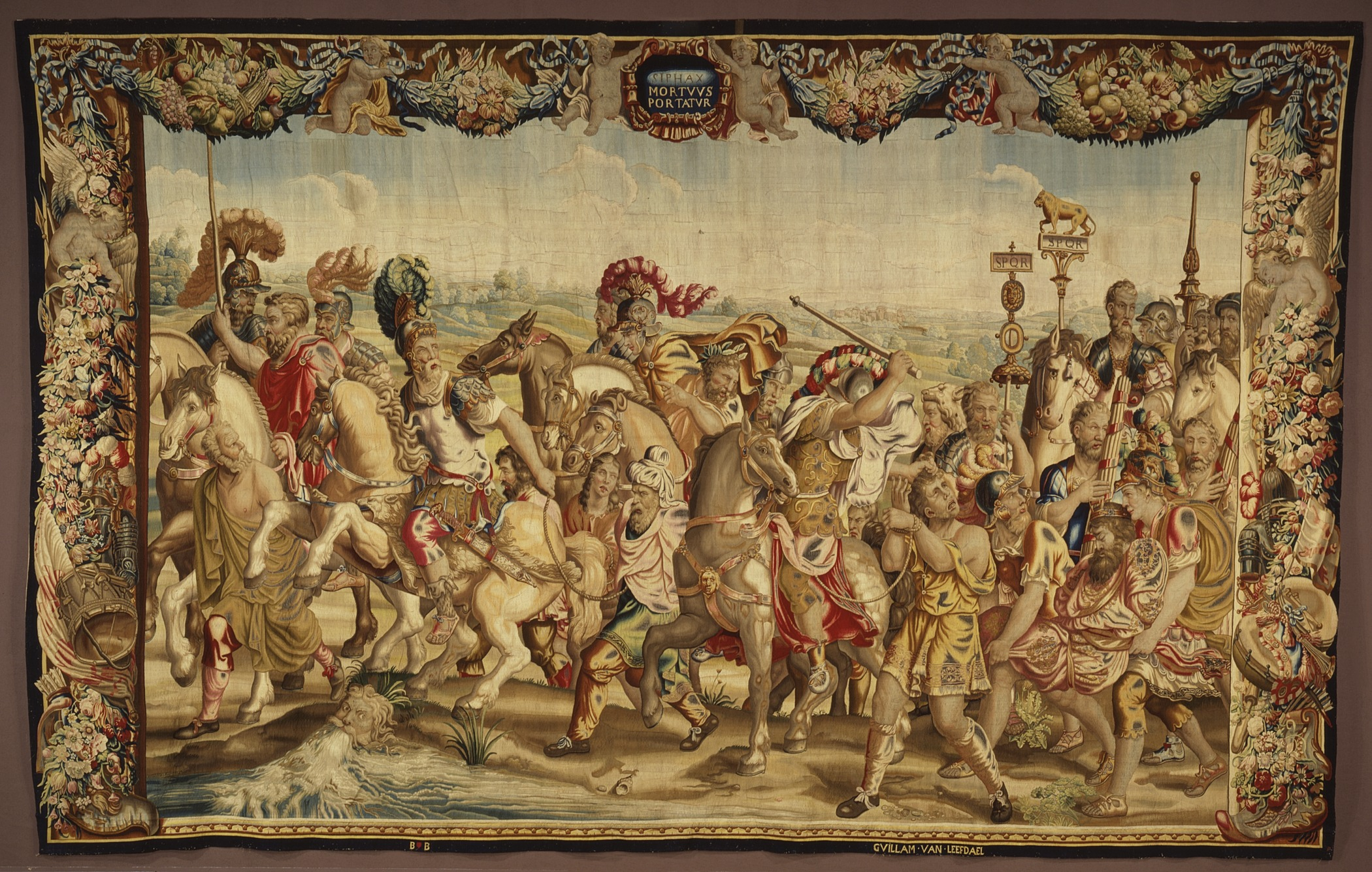
Death of king Syphax transported from the field of battle, Giulio Romano (Italy, Rome, 1499–1546), the Museum of contemporary Art, Los Angeles.

We are somewhat informed about the administrative organization of the kingdom; the study of coins in the name of Syphax and his son Vermina, suggest that Syphax would have associated his son with his reign. Strabo states that Massæsylia was an extremely rich kingdom; that it furnished a great deal of money and many soldiers. The war waged by Syphax against Carthage, followed by war against Rome and another war against Massinissa which required a large and versatile state budget with large reserves to pay for all these wars' toll was during the beginning of the decadence of the kingdom, therefore one could only imagine the expanse of the state budget at the golden age of the kingdom.

After the death of Gaia (c. 206 BC), king of the Massylii, Syphax attempted to seize his territories with the help of Carthage. Massinissa, originally an ally of Carthage, approached Rome to regain his kingdom. He succeeded in defeating Syphax and unified Numidia (c. 203-202 BC).

== Notes & references ==
=== Notes ===
- UNESCO (1997), "Private documents of United Nations Educational Scientific and Cultural : From the Seventh Century BC to the Seventh Century AD", History of Humanity: From the Seventh Century BC to the Seventh Century AD, United Nations Educational Scientific and Cultural, pp. 289–290, ISBN 9789231028120
