= Syphax =

- Agellid
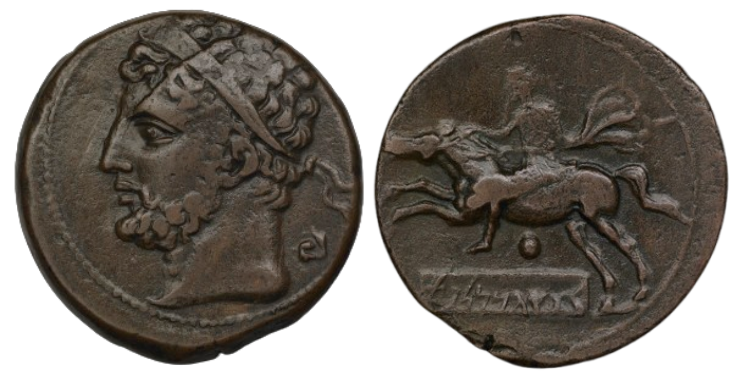
- Coin attributed to Syphax

King of the Masaesyli
- Reign: c. 225 – c. 203 BC
- Predecessor: perhaps Naravas
- Successor: Vermina
- Born: 250 BC; Siga
- Died: 202 BC (aged 47–48); Tivoli, Roman Republic
- Burial: Unknown place, Tivoli
- Spouse: Sophonisba
- Issue: Vermina; Tanakwa
- Military career
- Allegiance: Masaesyli
- Conflicts: Second Punic War: Battle of the Great Plains; Battle of Cirta (POW)

Syphax (Ancient Greek: Σύφαξ, Sýphax; Punic: 𐤎𐤐𐤒, spq; 250 BC – 202 BC) was a king of the Masaesyli tribe of western Numidia (present-day Algeria) during the last quarter of the 3rd century BC. His story is told in Livy's Ab Urbe Condita (written c. 27–25 BC). He ruled over a territory extending from present day Constantine to Moulouya. The territory from the Moulouya to the Strait of Gibraltar were under the influence of Syphax in some periods.

== Second Punic War ==
Extent of the Masaesylii Kingdom under Syphax between 220 and 206 BC

When a second war broke out between Carthage and Rome in 218 BC, Syphax was initially sympathetic to the Romans. In 213 BC, he concluded an alliance with the Romans and they sent Quintus Statorius as a military advisor to help Syphax train his troops. He then attacked the rival tribe of eastern Numidians, the Massylians, ruled by King Gala, who at that time were allied to the Carthaginians. When Gala died in 206 BC, his sons Masinissa and Oezalces quarreled about the inheritance, and Syphax was able to conquer considerable parts of the eastern Numidian kingdom.

=== Negotiations with Rome and Carthage ===
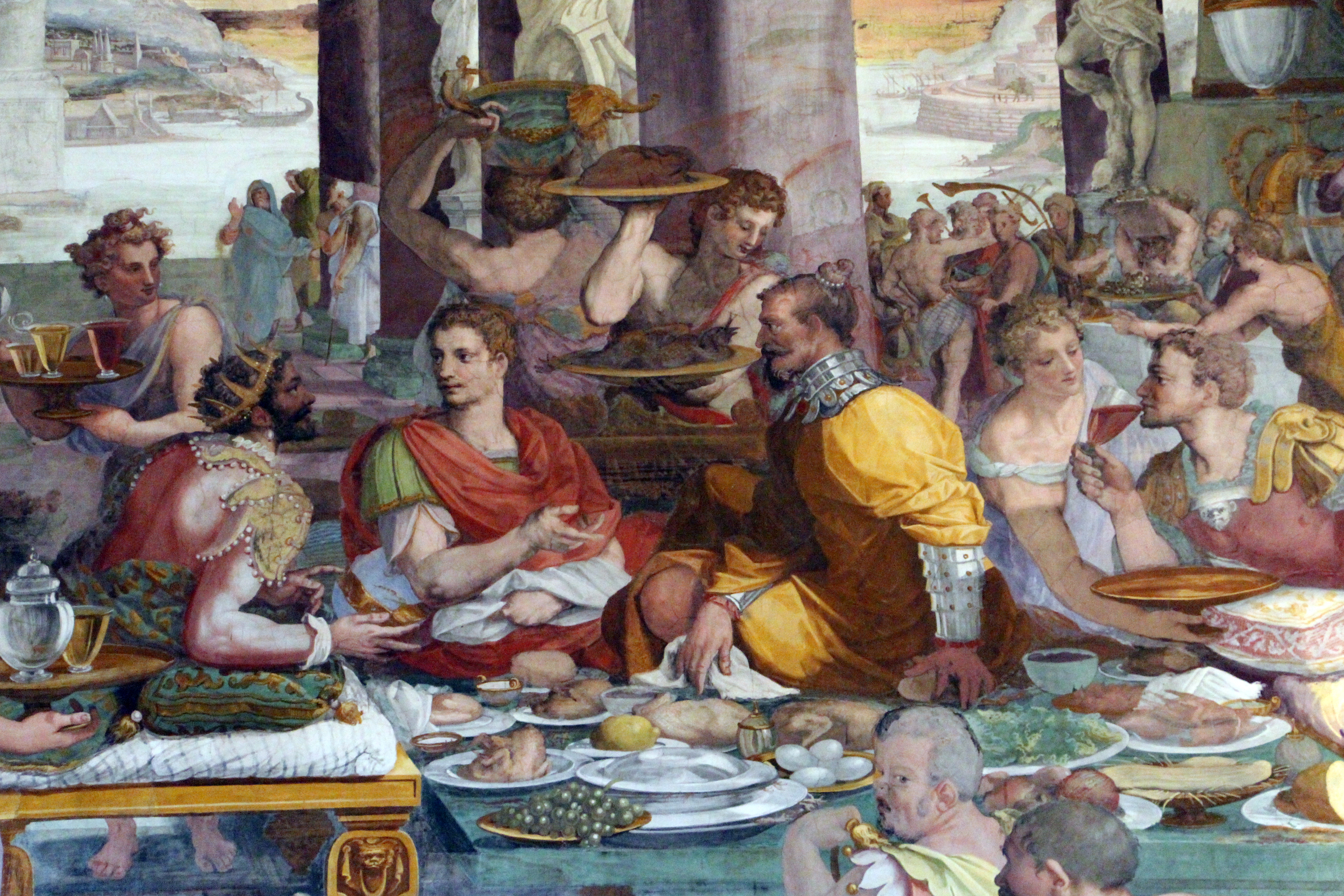
King Syphax of Numidia Receives Scipio Africanus by Alessandro Allori (1535–1607), sala di Léon X, Villa di Poggio a Caiano.

After the Roman general Publius Cornelius Scipio was victorious in the Battle of Ilipa (206 BC), he sent his friend Gaius Laelius to visit Syphax to ratify the treaty with Rome. Syphax, however, refused to ratify any treaty except with Scipio, so Scipio sailed with two quinqueremes to meet with Syphax, taking a considerable risk in doing so. In fact he arrived at the Numidian harbor at exactly the same time as Hasdrubal Gisco (who had fled from Spain) anchored there on his way back to Carthage. Scipio's ship managed to make harbor before Gisco's seven triremes could make out to intercept them, and in a neutral harbor, Gisco dared not act against the Romans. Syphax invited both to dinner, where both Syphax and Gisco were taken in by Scipio's charm.

== Alliance with Hasdrubal ==
Meanwhile, Masinissa had concluded that Rome was winning the war against Carthage and therefore decided to switch sides. Having lost the alliance with Masinissa, the Carthaginians started to look for another ally, which they found in Syphax. Hasdrubal Gisco sealed the alliance by offering his daughter Sophonisba in marriage, although until 206 BC she had been betrothed to Masinissa.

=== Battle of the Great Plains ===
With the reversal of alliances, it seemed that Carthage and Syphax were in a strong position in Africa. During the early stages of Scipio's campaign in North Africa, the joined forces of Syphax and Gisco were able to force Scipio to abandon the siege of Utica. However, in the 203 BC Battle of the Great Plains, Scipio overcame Gisco and Syphax and while the Roman general concentrated on Carthage, Laelius and Masinissa followed Syphax to Cirta.

=== Battle of Cirta ===
During the pursuit, Syphax was threatened with desertion by his army when Laelius and Masinissa's army approached the Numidian battle line. In a brave attempt to rally his troops, Syphax rode alone, straight towards the Roman cavalry, but in this desperate attempt his badly wounded horse threw him off. Syphax was pounced upon immediately by Roman soldiers and taken to the ecstatic Masinissa. Syphax's troops retreated to the capital city which later fell as Masinissa claimed his kingdom. Syphax was delivered to Scipio and was taken back to Rome as a prisoner. He died in Tibur (modern Tivoli) in 203 or 202 BC.

== After death ==
In a twist of fate, Sophonisba then married Masinissa. However, Scipio, suspicious of Sophonisba, demanded that she be taken to Rome and appear in the triumphal parade. To spare her such humiliation, Masinissa sent her poison, with which she killed herself.

== See also ==
- Royal Mausoleum of Syphax
