= Battle of the Great Plains =

203 BC battle in the Second Punic War

- Part of the Second Punic War
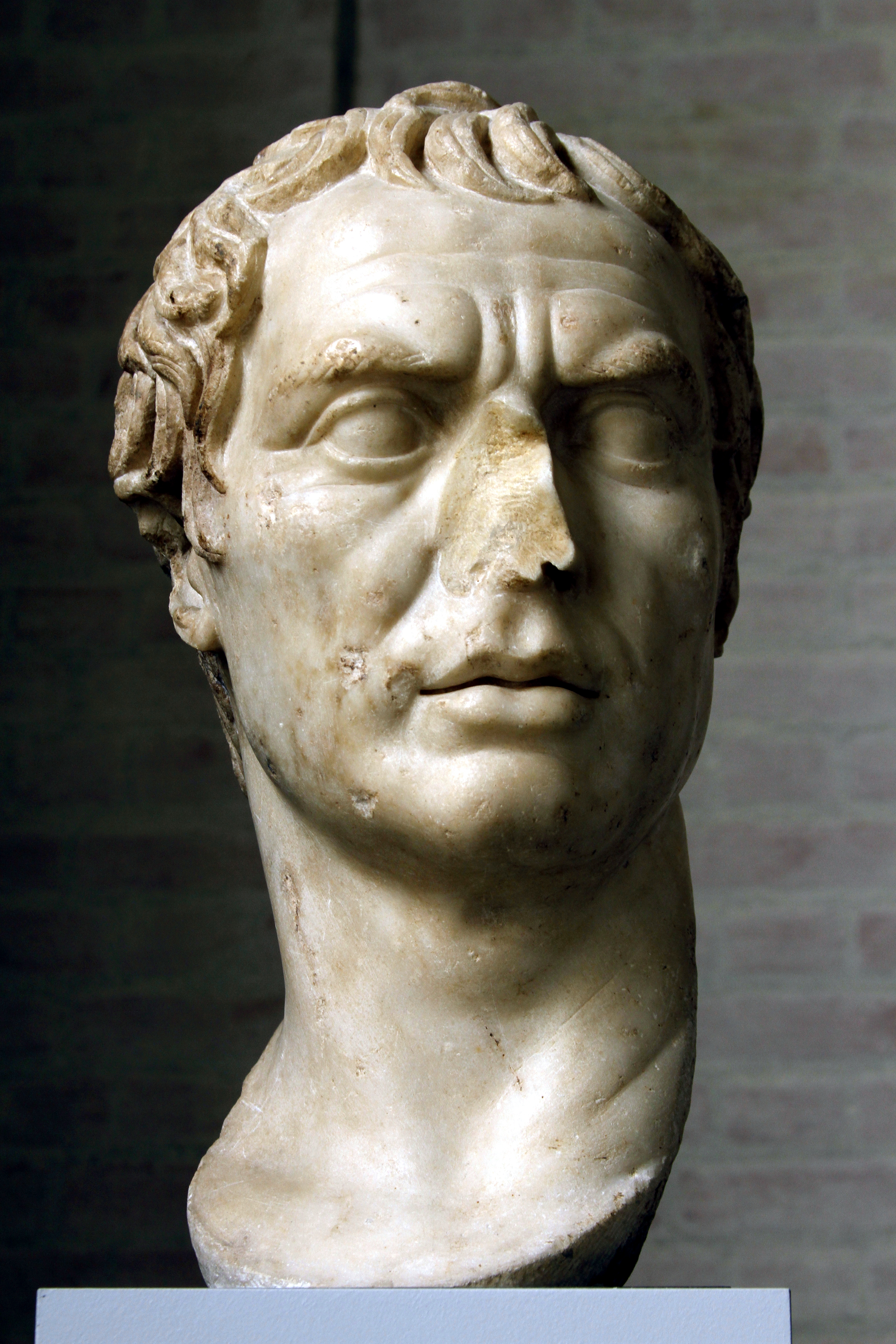
- A marble bust of the Roman commander, Scipio
Date	203 BC
Location	Bagradas River, Tunisia 36°36′41″N 8°56′38″E
Result	Roman victory

Belligerents
Rome; Eastern Numidia	Carthage; Western Numidia

Commanders and leaders
Publius Cornelius Scipio; Masinissa; Gaius Laelius	Hasdrubal Gisco; Syphax

Strength
c. 20,000	c. 30,000
- Location within Mediterranean

The battle of the Great Plains was fought in 203 BC in modern Tunisia between a Roman army commanded by Publius Cornelius Scipio, and allied Carthaginian and Numidian armies commanded by Hasdrubal Gisco and Syphax respectively. The battle was part of the Second Punic War and resulted in a heavy defeat for Carthage.

In the wake of its defeat in the First Punic War (264–241 BC) Carthage expanded its territory in south-east Iberia (modern Spain and Portugal). When the Second Punic War broke out in 218 BC a Roman army landed in north-east Iberia. After a disastrous Roman setback in 211 BC, Scipio took command in 210 BC and cleared the peninsula of Carthaginians in five years. He returned to Rome determined to carry the war to the Carthaginian homeland in North Africa. Appointed consul in 205 BC Scipio spent a year in Sicily training his army and accumulating supplies. In 204 BC the Romans landed with four legions near the Carthaginian port of Utica and besieged it. The Carthaginians and their Numidian allies each set up their own camps about 11 kilometres (7 mi) from the Romans but close to each other. After several months of little activity Scipio launched a surprise night attack on both camps, overrunning them and setting fire to much of both. Carthaginian and Numidian casualties were heavy.

The Carthaginians reformed their army in an area known as the Great Plains, 120 kilometres (75 mi) from Utica. They were reinforced by 4,000 Iberian warriors to a total of about 30,000 men. Hearing of this, Scipio immediately marched most of his army to the scene. The size of his army is not known, but it was outnumbered by the Carthaginians. After several days of skirmishing, both armies committed to a pitched battle. Upon being charged by the Romans all of those Carthaginians who had been involved in the debacle at Utica turned and fled; morale had not recovered. Only the Iberians stood and fought. They were enveloped by the well-drilled Roman legions and wiped out.

Syphax and his Numidians were pursued, brought to battle at Cirta, and again defeated; Syphax was captured. The Roman ally Masinissa took over his kingdom. Scipio moved his main army to Tunis, within sight of the city of Carthage. Scipio and Carthage entered into peace negotiations, and Carthage recalled armies from Italy commanded by Hannibal and Mago Barca. The Roman Senate ratified a draft treaty, but because of mistrust and a surge in confidence when Hannibal arrived from Italy, Carthage repudiated it. The following year the Carthaginians raised another army, incorporating Hannibal and Mago's recalled veterans. This was also defeated by Scipio, at the battle of Zama. Carthage sued for peace and accepted a humiliating treaty, ending the war.

== Background ==
=== First Punic War ===
The First Punic War was fought between the two main powers of the western Mediterranean in the 3rd century BC: Carthage and Rome. The war lasted for 23 years, from 264 to 241 BC, and was fought primarily on the Mediterranean island of Sicily, its surrounding waters and in North Africa. The Carthaginians were defeated and by the terms of the Treaty of Lutatius evacuated Sicily and paid Rome an indemnity of 3,200 silver talents (Note: Several different "talents" are known from antiquity. The ones referred to in this article are all Euboic (or Euboeic) talents, of approximately 26 kilograms (57 lb). 3,200 talents was approximately 82,000 kg (81 long tons).) over ten years. Four years later, Rome seized Sardinia and Corsica on a cynical pretence and imposed a further 1,200 talent indemnity, (Note: 1,200 talents was approximately 30,000 kg (30 long tons) of silver.) actions which fuelled Carthaginian resentment. The near-contemporary Greek historian Polybius considered this act of bad faith by the Romans to be the single greatest cause of war with Carthage breaking out again nineteen years later.

From 236 BC Carthage expanded its territory in Iberia (modern Spain and Portugal). In 226 BC the Ebro Treaty with Rome established the Ebro River as the northern boundary of the Carthaginian sphere of influence. A little later Rome made a separate treaty of association with the city of Saguntum, well south of the Ebro. In 219 BC Hannibal, the de facto ruler of Carthaginian Iberia, led an army to Saguntum and besieged, captured and sacked it. In early 219 BC Rome declared war on Carthage, starting the Second Punic War.

=== Second Punic War ===
The approximate extent of territory controlled by Rome and Carthage immediately before the start of the Second Punic War

In 218 BC Hannibal led a large Carthaginian army from Iberia through Gaul, over the Alps and invaded mainland Italy. During the next three years Hannibal inflicted heavy defeats on the Romans at the battles of the Trebia, Lake Trasimene and Cannae. At the last of these alone, at least 67,500 Romans were killed or captured. The historian Toni Ñaco del Hoyo describes these as "great military calamities", Brian Carey writes that they brought Rome to the brink of collapse. Hannibal's army campaigned in Italy for a further 14 years before the survivors withdrew.

There was also extensive fighting in Iberia, Sicily, Sardinia and North Africa. In 211 BC the Romans suffered a severe reverse at the battle of the Upper Baetis and were penned back by the Carthaginians to the north-east corner of Iberia. In 210 BC Roman reinforcements stabilised the situation; later that year Publius Cornelius Scipio (Note: Publius Scipio was the bereaved son of the previous Roman co-commander in Iberia, also named Publius Scipio, and the nephew of the other co-commander, Gnaeus Scipio.) arrived with further Roman reinforcements to take command in Iberia. In a carefully planned assault in 209 BC he captured the centre of Carthaginian power in Iberia, New Carthage. During the following four years Scipio repeatedly defeated the Carthaginians and drove them out of Iberia in 205 BC.

=== Opposing forces ===
==== Roman ====
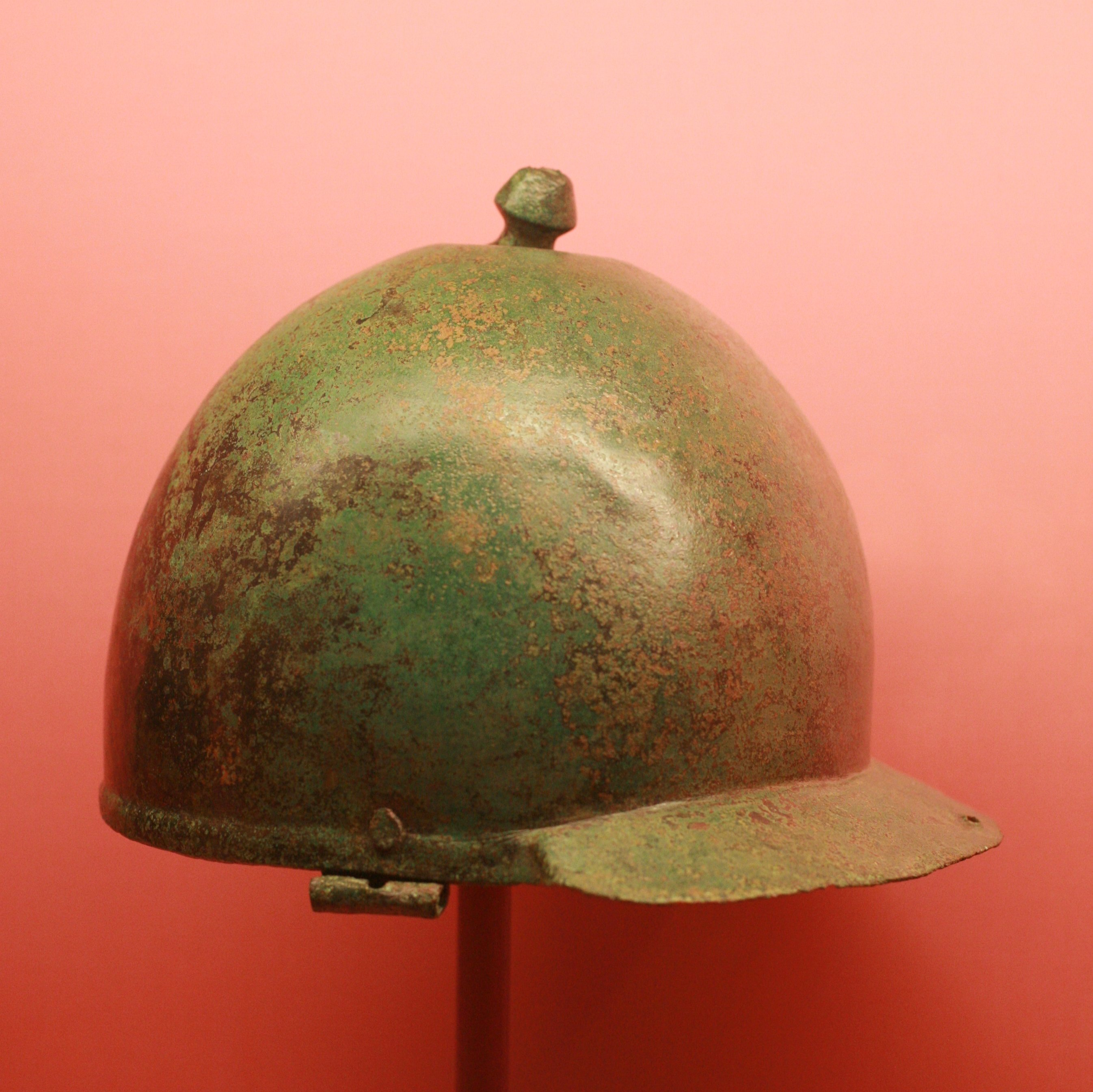
The bowl of a Montefortino-type helmet, which was used by Roman infantry between c. 300 BC and 100 AD. The cheek guards are missing.

Most male Roman citizens were liable for military service and would serve as infantry, a better-off minority providing a cavalry component. Traditionally, when at war the Romans would raise two legions, each of 4,200 infantry – this could be increased to 5,000 in some circumstances, or, rarely, even more. – and 300 cavalry. Approximately 1,200 of the infantry – poorer or younger men unable to afford the armour and equipment of a standard legionary – served as javelin-armed skirmishers known as velites; they each carried several javelins, which would be thrown from a distance, a short sword and a 90-centimetre (3 ft) shield. The balance were equipped as heavy infantry, with body armour, a large shield and short thrusting swords. They were divided into three ranks, of which the front rank, known as hastati, also carried two javelins; the second and third ranks, known as principes and triari respectively, had a thrusting spear instead. Both legionary sub-units and individual legionaries fought in relatively open order.

It was the long-standing Roman procedure to elect two men each year as senior magistrates, known as consuls, who in time of war would each lead an army. An army was usually formed by combining a Roman legion with a similarly sized and equipped legion provided by their Latin allies; allied legions usually had a larger attached complement of cavalry than Roman ones. By this stage of the war, Roman armies were generally larger, typically consisting of four legions, two Roman and two provided by its allies, for a total of approximately 20,000 men. The Roman army which invaded Africa consisted of four legions, each of the Roman pair reinforced to an unprecedented 6,200 infantry and with a more usual 300 cavalry each. Modern historians estimate the army to have totalled 25,000–30,000 men, including perhaps 2,500 cavalry.

==== Carthaginian ====
Carthaginian citizens only served in their army if there was a direct threat to the city of Carthage. When they did they fought as well-armoured heavy infantry armed with long thrusting spears, although they were notoriously ill-trained and ill-disciplined. In most circumstances Carthage recruited foreigners to make up its army. (Note: Roman and Greek sources refer to these foreign fighters derogatively as "mercenaries", but the modern historian Adrian Goldsworthy describes this as "a gross oversimplification". They served under several arrangements: some were the regular troops of allied cities or kingdoms seconded to Carthage as part of formal treaties; some were from allied states fighting under their own leaders; many were volunteers from areas under Carthaginian control who were not Carthaginian citizens. (Citizenship was largely reserved for inhabitants of the city of Carthage.)) Many were from North Africa and these were frequently referred to as "Libyans". The region provided several types of fighters, including: close order infantry equipped with large shields, helmets, short swords and long thrusting spears; javelin-armed light infantry skirmishers; close order shock cavalry (Note: "Shock" troops are those trained and used to close rapidly with an opponent, with the intention of breaking them before, or immediately upon, contact.) (also known as "heavy cavalry") carrying spears; and light cavalry skirmishers who threw javelins from a distance and avoided close combat. (The latter were usually Numidians.) The close order African infantry and the citizen-militia both fought in a tightly packed formation known as a phalanx. On occasion some of the infantry would wear captured Roman armour. As well both Iberia and Gaul provided experienced but unarmoured infantry who would charge ferociously, but had a reputation for breaking off if a combat was protracted. Slingers were frequently recruited from the Balearic Islands.

==== Battles ====
Pitched battles were usually preceded by the two armies camping 2–12 kilometres (1–7 mi) apart for days or weeks; sometimes forming up in battle order each day. If either commander felt at a disadvantage, they might march off without engaging. In such circumstances it was difficult to force a battle if either of the commanders was unwilling to fight. Forming up in battle order was a complicated and premeditated affair, which took several hours. Infantry were usually positioned in the centre of the battle line, with light infantry skirmishers to their front and cavalry on each flank.

== Prelude ==
In 206 BC Scipio left Iberia and returned to Italy. He was denied the triumph he would normally have expected on the grounds that he had not occupied any of the magistracies of the cursus honorum, the sequential mixture of military and political administrative positions held by aspiring Roman politicians. Aged 31 he was elected to the senior position of consul in early 205 BC, despite not meeting the minimum age for the position of 42. Scipio was already anticipating an invasion of North Africa and while still in Spain had been negotiating with the Numidian leaders Masinissa and Syphax. He failed to win over the latter, but made an ally of the former.

Opinion was divided in Roman political circles as to whether an invasion of North Africa was excessively risky. Hannibal was still on Italian soil; there was the possibility of further Carthaginian invasions, shortly to be realised when Mago Barca landed in Liguria; the practical difficulties of an amphibious invasion and its logistical follow up were considerable; and when the Romans had invaded North Africa in 256 BC during the First Punic War they had been driven out with heavy losses, which had re-energised the Carthaginians. Eventually a compromise was agreed: Scipio was given Sicily as his consular province, which was the best location for the Romans to launch an invasion of the Carthaginian homeland from and then logistically support it, and permission to cross to Africa on his own judgement. But Roman commitment was less than wholehearted: Scipio was not allowed to conscript troops for his consular army, as was usual, but could only call for volunteers.

In 216 BC the survivors of the Roman defeat at Cannae had been formed into two legions and sent to Sicily. They still formed the main part of the garrison of Sicily and Scipio used the many men who volunteered to increase the strength of each of these to an unprecedented 6,500. The total number of men available to Scipio and how many of them travelled to Africa is unclear; the Roman historian Livy, writing 200 years later, gives totals for the invasion force of either 12,200, 17,600 or 35,000. Modern historians estimate a combat strength of 25,000–30,000, of whom more than 90 per cent were infantry. With up to half of the complement of his legions being fresh volunteers, and with no fighting having taken place on Sicily for the past five years, Scipio instigated a rigorous training regime. This extended from drill by individual centuries – the basic Roman army manoeuvre unit of 80 men – to exercises by the full army. This lasted for approximately a year. At the same time Scipio assembled a vast quantity of food and materiel, merchant ships to transport it and his troops, and warships to escort the transports.

Also during 205 BC 30 Roman ships under Scipio's second-in-command, the legate Gaius Laelius, raided North Africa around Hippo Regius, gathering large quantities of loot and many captives. The Carthaginians initially believed this was the anticipated invasion by Scipio and his full invasion force; they hastily strengthened fortifications and raised troops – including some units made up of Carthaginian citizens. Reinforcements were sent to Mago in an attempt to distract the Romans in Italy. Meanwhile a succession war had broken out in Numidia between the Roman-supporting Masinissa and the Carthaginian-inclined Syphax. Laelius re-established contact with Masinissa during his raid. Masinissa expressed dismay regarding how long it was taking the Romans to complete their preparations and land in Africa.

== Invasion ==
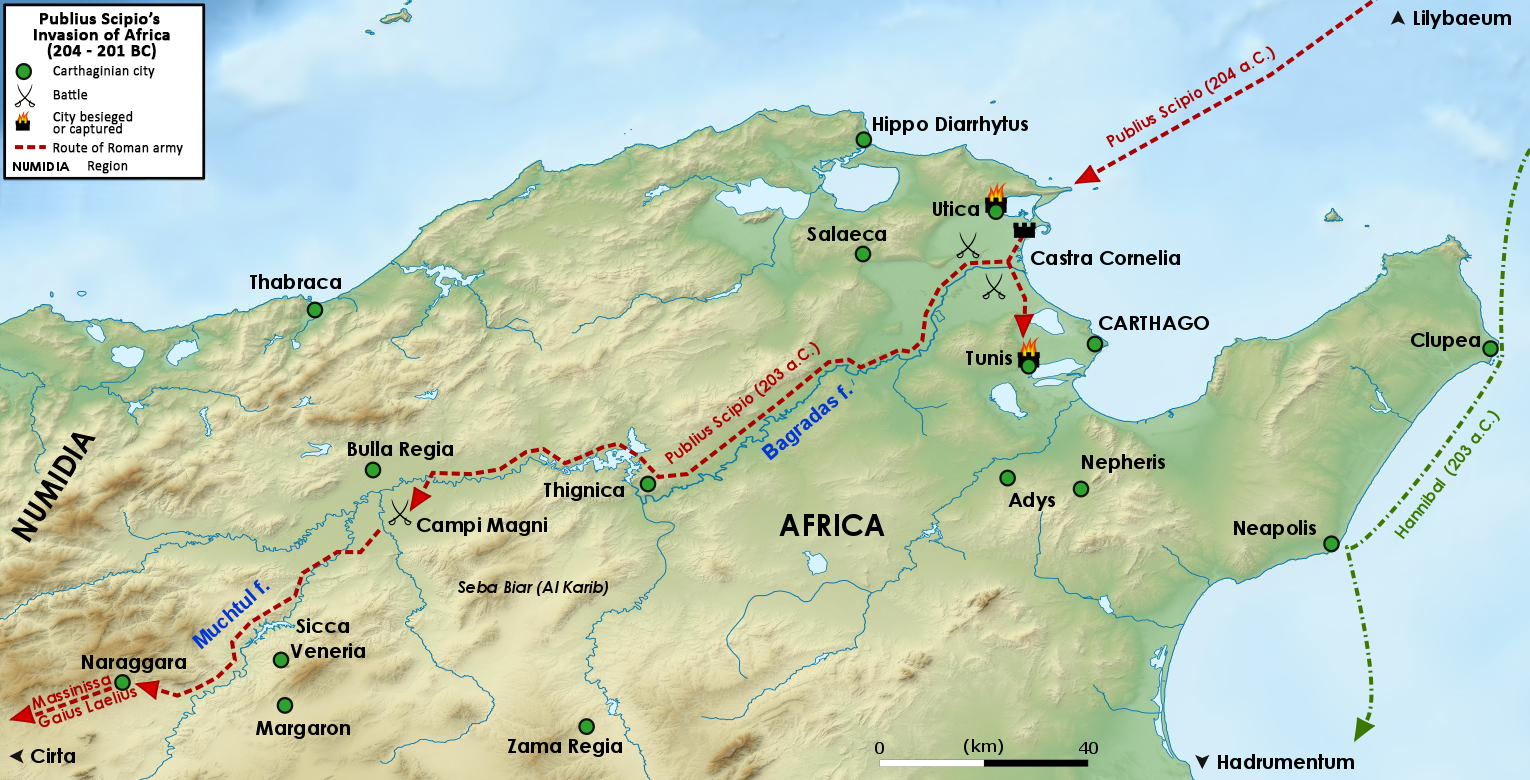
Part of North Africa with Scipio's campaign shown

In 204 BC, probably in June or July, the Roman army left Sicily in 400 transport ships, escorted by 40 galleys. Three days later they disembarked at Cape Farina 20 kilometres (12 mi) north of the large Carthaginian port of Utica. The locals fled and Carthage's immediate response, a scouting party of 500 cavalry, was defeated with the loss of its commander and the general in overall charge of responding to the invasion. The area was pillaged and 8,000 captives were sent back to Sicily as slaves or hostages. Masinissa joined the Romans with either 200 or 2,000 men, the sources differ. A large fortified camp was established on a rocky peninsula near Ghar el-Melh which was known as Castra Cornelia. Masinissa had been recently defeated by his Numidian rival Syphax, wounded and had his army scattered. Syphax had been persuaded to take firm action in support of Carthage by the Carthaginian general Hasdrubal Gisco and by his assertive new wife: Hasdrubal's daughter Sophonisba.

Carthage sent a larger party to probe the Roman position, about 4,000 soldiers under a general called Hanno. His command of mixed Numidians and Carthaginian citizens based itself at Salaeca, 24 kilometres (15 mi) from the Romans, and did little scouting. Following a stratagem agreed with Scipio, Masinissa's cavalry raided Hanno's force who chased them off and then pursued them into a Roman ambush. Hanno died in a sharp conflict during which 1,000 of his men were killed or taken prisoner. The survivors were in turn pursued for 50 kilometres (30 mi), only 1,000 escaped. The Romans pillaged an ever-wider area, sending their loot and prisoners to Sicily in the ships bringing their supplies.

Wanting a more permanent base and a port more resilient to the bad weather to be expected when winter came, Scipio besieged Utica. Despite the Romans being well supplied with siege engines the siege dragged on and a Carthaginian army under Hasdrubal set up a fortified camp 11 kilometres (7 mi) from the Romans with a reported 33,000 men. Syphax joined him, establishing his own camp 3 kilometres (2 mi) away from Hasdrubal's with a reported 60,000 troops. The size of both of these armies as reported by ancient historians has been questioned by their modern counterparts as being infeasibly large. Nevertheless, it is accepted that the Romans were considerably outnumbered, in particular in terms of cavalry. The modern historian Dexter Hoyos suggests a combined Numidian and Carthaginian total of 47,500 men. The Romans pulled back from Utica to Castra Cornelia, where they were themselves now blockaded on the landward side. Being outnumbered, Scipio was reluctant to commit his army to a pitched battle. Hasdrubal in turn was aware that two years earlier an army led by him in Iberia had been heavily defeated by a much smaller Roman army commanded by Scipio at the battle of Ilipa and so was himself reluctant to commit to a battle. He knew that more troops were being recruited in Iberia and was happy to pause hostilities until they joined his army.

Scipio sent emissaries to Syphax to attempt to persuade him to defect. Syphax in turn offered to broker peace terms. A series of exchanges of negotiating parties followed, the sessions lasting several days. With his delegations Scipio sent junior officers disguised as slaves to report back on the layout and construction of the Numidian camp, as well as the size and composition of the Numidian army and the most frequented routes in and out of the camp. The Carthaginian camp was solidly constructed, with earthen ramparts and timber-built barracks, but the Numidian one less so, with no clearly defined perimeter and the accommodation for the soldiers being largely constructed of reeds and roofed with thatch.

=== Battle of Utica ===
As the weather improved Scipio made conspicuous preparations to assault Utica. Instead, he marched his army out late one evening and divided it in two. One part launched a night attack on the Numidian camp, setting fire to their reed barracks. In the ensuing panic and confusion the Numidians were dispersed with heavy casualties. Not realising what was happening, many Carthaginians set off in the dark to help extinguish what they assumed was an accidental blaze in their allies' camp. Scipio attacked them with the remaining Romans, stormed their camp and set fire to many of the Carthaginians' wooden huts. Again the Romans inflicted heavy casualties in the dark.

Hasdrubal fled 40 kilometres (25 mi) to Carthage with 2,500 survivors, pursued by Scipio. Syphax escaped with a few cavalry and regrouped 11 kilometres (7 mi) away. With no Carthaginian field army to threaten them, the Romans pressed their siege of Utica and pillaged an extensive area of North Africa with strong and far-ranging raids. As well as gold and slaves the Romans accumulated large amounts of foodstuffs. This was added to the extensive stocks already built up by shipping grain from Sicily.

== Battle ==
When word of the defeat reached Carthage there was panic, and some senators wanted to renew the peace negotiations. The Carthaginian Senate also heard demands for Hannibal's army to be recalled. A decision was reached to fight on with locally available resources. A force of 4,000 Iberian warriors finally arrived in Carthage, although their strength was exaggerated to 10,000 to maintain morale. Hasdrubal raised further local troops with whom to reinforce the survivors of Utica. Syphax remained loyal and joined Hasdrubal with what was left of his army. The combined force is estimated at 30,000 and they established a strong camp on a flat plain of the Bagradas River known as the Great Plains. This was near modern Souk el Kremis and about 120 kilometres (75 mi) from Utica. Hasdrubal assembled this substantial force within 30–50 days of the defeat at Utica.

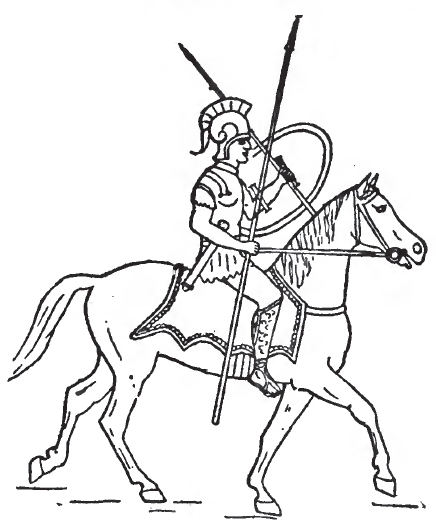
Carthaginian cavalryman, as depicted in 1891

When he heard that the Carthaginians were reassembling their army, Scipio left a force to continue the siege of Utica and led the rest on a rapid march to the Great Plains. His army did not take a baggage train, which suggests that Scipio was intent on bringing the Carthaginians to battle as soon as possible. It is not known how large this army was, but it was smaller than the Carthaginian; the modern historian Brian Carey suggests that it was about 20,000 strong. The Romans established a fortified camp approximately 6 kilometres (4 mi) from that of the Carthaginians. For three days there were skirmishes between the lighter troops of both sides, but their main forces stayed in camp. On the fourth day, nine days after Scipio had left Utica, both commanders formed up their full armies and they advanced towards each other.

Both armies deployed in the usual formation. Hasdrubal placed his newly arrived Iberian infantry in the centre of his line, with the Carthaginian infantry who had survived the battle at Utica on their right, and to their right his Carthaginian cavalry. To the left of the Iberians were Syphax's Numidian infantry and to their left Numidian cavalry. The two Roman legions took position in the centre of their line, deployed in their customary three lines. An allied legion deployed in similar fashion on each side of the Romans. On the Roman right flank were the cavalry attached to the four legions with Laelius in command; the Numidian cavalry under Masinissa were on the left flank.

The two armies approached each other and the battle opened when the cavalry on each flank charged. Then either both units of Carthaginian cavalry broke on contact and were routed, or possibly turned and fled without attempting to counter-charge their attackers. The two legions of Latin allies charged the opponents facing them and again the Carthaginian and Numidian infantry put up little or no resistance before turning and fleeing. It is possible that these troops started to flee as soon as their flanking cavalry did, well before the Latin allies contacted them. Many of the men of these units had been involved in the recent debacle of the burning camps at Utica and the memory of having been beaten by the same Roman army reduced their morale to the point that they had no stomach for the fight. The Roman cavalry and the two Latin legions pursued their opponents off the battlefield.

The Iberians however charged home against the hastati in the front rank of the two Roman legions and fought fiercely. Once he saw that his hastati were holding their own Scipio did not follow normal practice, which would have been to feed in men from the second rank of principes to replace casualties and relieve tired fighters. Instead he had the principes and triari of each legion form a column, march parallel to the line of battle and then round to attack the Iberians in the flank and rear. Thus enveloped, the Iberians fought to the death and were wiped out. A large proportion of the rest of the Carthaginian army succeeded in escaping. Most of these deserted rather than rallying to either Hasdrubal or Syphax.

The historian Nigel Bagnall considers it a "foolish decision" by Hasdrubal to fight a battle with an army consisting entirely of men who were either demoralised or new recruits and whose state of training was "deplorably low". He describes the Roman army as "battle-hardened" and as having high morale. He suggests that Scipio's rapid march from Utica forced the Carthaginians into a battle before they were ready.

== Aftermath ==
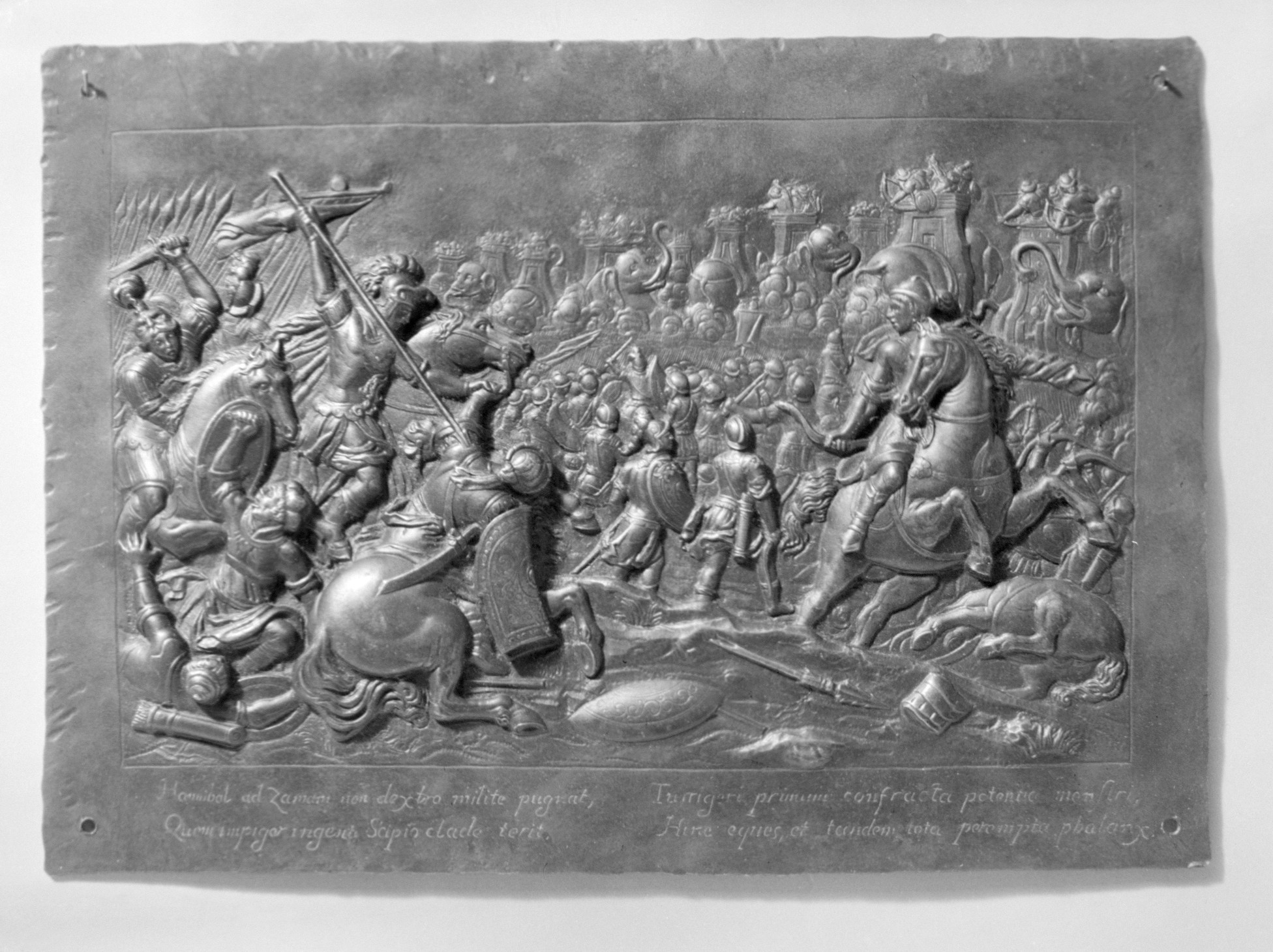
The battle of Zama, as envisaged in the 17th century

Hasdrubal fled to Carthage, where he was demoted and exiled. Syphax and his Numidians were pursued, brought to battle outside his capital, Cirta, and again defeated, Syphax being captured. Cirta surrendered to Masinissa, who took over Syphax's kingdom. (Note: Masinissa also married Syphax's wife, Sophonisba, Hasdrubal's daughter.) Scipio moved his main army to Tunis, within sight of the city of Carthage. Scipio and Carthage entered into peace negotiations, while Carthage recalled both Hannibal and Mago from Italy. The Roman Senate ratified a draft treaty, but because of mistrust and a surge in confidence when Hannibal arrived from Italy, Carthage repudiated it.

Hannibal was placed in command of another army, formed of his and Mago's veterans from Italy and newly raised troops from Africa, with 80 war elephants but few cavalry. The decisive battle of Zama followed in October 202 BC. After a prolonged fight the Carthaginian army collapsed; Hannibal was one of the few to escape the field.

The peace treaty the Romans subsequently imposed on the Carthaginians stripped them of all their overseas territories and some of their African ones. An indemnity of 10,000 silver talents (Note: 10,000 talents was approximately 269,000 kilograms (265 long tons) of silver.) was to be paid over 50 years. Hostages were taken. Carthage was forbidden to possess war elephants and its fleet was restricted to 10 warships. It was prohibited from waging war outside Africa, and in Africa only with Rome's express permission. Many senior Carthaginians wanted to reject it, but Hannibal spoke strongly in its favour and it was accepted in spring 201 BC. Henceforth it was clear Carthage was politically subordinate to Rome. Scipio was awarded a triumph and received the agnomen "Africanus".

== Notes, citations and sources ==
=== Sources ===
- Bagnall, Nigel (1999). The Punic Wars: Rome, Carthage and the Struggle for the Mediterranean. London: Pimlico. ISBN 978-0-7126-6608-4.
- Briscoe, John (2006). "The Second Punic War". In Astin, A. E.; Walbank, F. W.; Frederiksen, M. W.; Ogilvie, R. M. (eds.). The Cambridge Ancient History: Rome and the Mediterranean to 133 B.C. Vol. VIII (2 ed.). Cambridge: Cambridge University Press. pp. 44–80. ISBN 978-0-521-23448-1.
- Carey, Brian Todd (2007). Hannibal's Last Battle: Zama & the Fall of Carthage. Barnsley, South Yorkshire: Pen & Sword. ISBN 978-1-84415-635-1.
- Coarelli, Filippo (2002). "I ritratti di 'Mario' e 'Silla' a Monaco e il sepolcro degli Scipioni". Eutopia Nuova Serie (in Italian). II (1): 47–75. ISSN 1121-1628.
- Collins, Roger (1998). Spain: An Oxford Archaeological Guide. Oxford: Oxford University Press. ISBN 978-0-19-285300-4.
- Edwell, Peter (2015) [2011]. "War Abroad: Spain, Sicily, Macedon, Africa". In Hoyos, Dexter (ed.). A Companion to the Punic Wars. Chichester, West Sussex: John Wiley. pp. 320–338. ISBN 978-1-119-02550-4.
- Etcheto, Henri (2012). Les Scipions. Famille et pouvoir à Rome à l'époque républicaine (in French). Bordeaux: Ausonius Éditions. ISBN 978-2-35613-073-0.
- Goldsworthy, Adrian (2006). The Fall of Carthage: The Punic Wars 265–146 BC. London: Phoenix. ISBN 978-0-304-36642-2.
- Hoyos, Dexter (2003). Hannibal's Dynasty: Power and politics in the Western Mediterranean, 247–183 BC. London; New York: Routledge. ISBN 978-0-203-41782-9.
- Hoyos, Dexter (2015) [2011]. A Companion to the Punic Wars. Chichester, West Sussex: John Wiley. ISBN 978-1-1190-2550-4.
- Hoyos, Dexter (2015b). Mastering the West: Rome and Carthage at War. Oxford: Oxford University Press. ISBN 978-0-19-986010-4.
- Jones, Archer (1987). The Art of War in the Western World. Urbana: University of Illinois Press. ISBN 978-0-252-01380-5.
- Koon, Sam (2015) [2011]. "Phalanx and Legion: the "Face" of Punic War Battle". In Hoyos, Dexter (ed.). A Companion to the Punic Wars. Chichester, West Sussex: John Wiley. pp. 77–94. ISBN 978-1-1190-2550-4.
- Lazenby, John (1996). The First Punic War: A Military History. Stanford, California: Stanford University Press. ISBN 978-0-8047-2673-3.
- Lazenby, John (1998). Hannibal's War: A Military History of the Second Punic War. Warminster: Aris & Phillips. ISBN 978-0-85668-080-9.
- Miles, Richard (2011). Carthage Must be Destroyed. London: Penguin. ISBN 978-0-14-101809-6.
- Ñaco del Hoyo, Toni (2015) [2011]. "Roman Economy, Finance, and Politics in the Second Punic War". In Hoyos, Dexter (ed.). A Companion to the Punic Wars. Chichester, West Sussex: John Wiley. pp. 376–392. ISBN 978-1-1190-2550-4.
- Rawlings, Louis (1996). "Celts, Spaniards, and Samnites: Warriors in a Soldier's War". Bulletin of the Institute of Classical Studies. Supplement. The Second Punic War: A Reappraisal. 2 (67). London: Institute of Classical Studies/Oxford University Press: 81–95. ISSN 2398-3264. JSTOR 43767904.
- Rawlings, Louis (2015) [2011]. "The War in Italy, 218–203". In Hoyos, Dexter (ed.). A Companion to the Punic Wars. Chichester, West Sussex: John Wiley. pp. 299–319. ISBN 978-1-1190-2550-4.
- Sabin, Philip (1996). "The Mechanics of Battle in the Second Punic War". Bulletin of the Institute of Classical Studies. Supplement. 67 (67): 59–79. JSTOR 43767903.
- Scullard, Howard H. (2006) [1989]. "Carthage and Rome". In Walbank, F. W.; Astin, A. E.; Frederiksen, M. W. & Ogilvie, R. M. (eds.). Cambridge Ancient History. Vol. VII, part 2 (2 ed.). Cambridge: Cambridge University Press. pp. 486–569. ISBN 978-0-521-23446-7.
- Zimmermann, Klaus (2015) [2011]. "Roman Strategy and Aims in the Second Punic War". In Hoyos, Dexter (ed.). A Companion to the Punic Wars. Oxford: Wiley-Blackwell. pp. 280–298. ISBN 978-1-405-17600-2.
