= Battle of Ibera =

Battle of the Second Punic War, fought in Spain

- Part of the Second Punic War
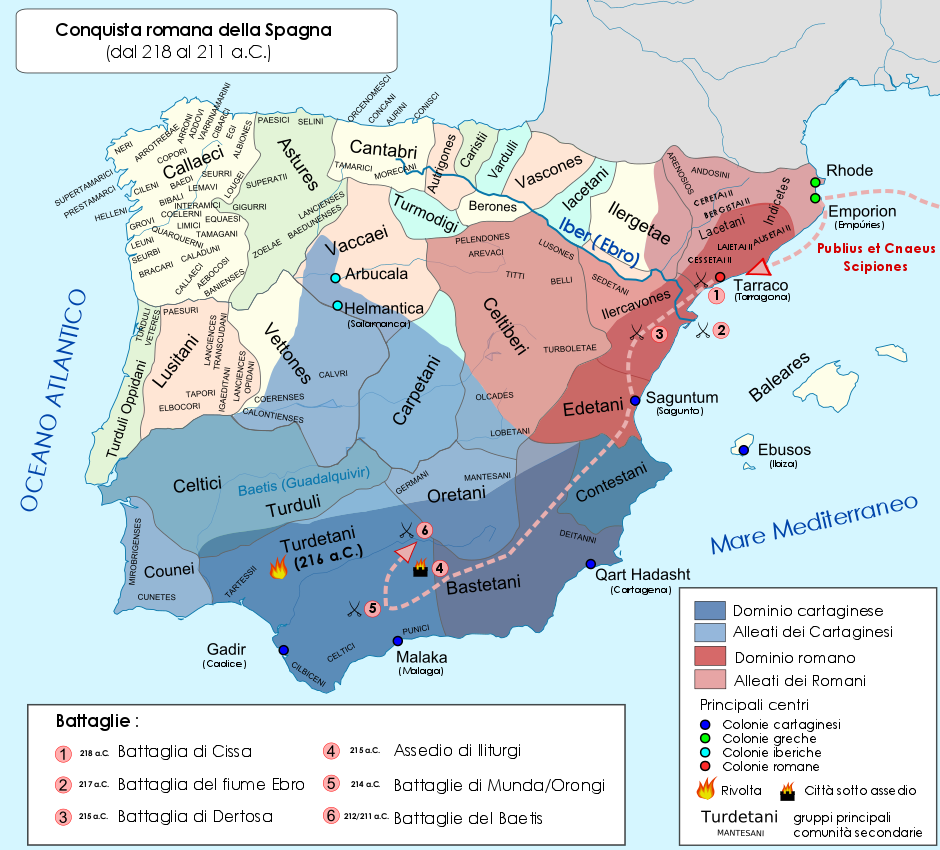
Date	Spring 215 BC
Location	Ibera; present-day Tortosa, Catalonia, Spain 40.8°N 0.516°E
Result	Roman victory

Belligerents
Rome	Carthage

Commanders and leaders
Gnaeus Cornelius Scipio; Publius Cornelius Scipio	Hasdrubal Barca

Strength
c. 25,000	c. 25,000; War elephants

Casualties and losses
Heavy	Heavy

The Battle of Ibera, also known as the Battle of Dertosa, was fought in the spring of 215 BC on the south bank of the Ebro River near the town of Ibera and was part of the Second Punic War. A Roman army, under the command of the brothers Gnaeus and Publius Scipio, defeated a similarly sized Carthaginian army under Hasdrubal Barca. The Romans, under Gnaeus Scipio, had invaded Iberia in late 218 BC and established a foothold after winning the Battle of Cissa. This lodgement, on the north-east Iberian coast, between the Ebro and the Pyrenees, blocked the route of any reinforcements from Iberia for the army of Hannibal, who had invaded Italy from Iberia earlier in the year. Hasdrubal attempted to evict the Romans in 217 BC, but this ended in defeat when the Carthaginian naval contingent was mauled at the Battle of Ebro River.

Hasdrubal spent the rest of 217 BC and all of 216 BC subduing rebellious indigenous Iberian tribes, largely in the south. Under pressure from Carthage to reinforce Hannibal, and having been strongly reinforced, Hasdrubal marched north again in early 215 BC. Meanwhile, Scipio, who had also been reinforced, and joined by his brother Publius, had crossed the Ebro to besiege the Carthaginian-aligned town of Ibera. Hasdrubal approached and offered battle, which the Scipios accepted. Both armies were of similar sizes, about 25,000 men. When they clashed, the centre of Hasdrubal's army – which consisted of locally recruited Iberians – fled without fighting. The Roman legions pushed through the gap, turned to each side against the remaining Carthaginian infantry and enveloped them. Both sides are reported to have suffered heavy casualties; the Carthaginians' may have been very heavy. The Carthaginian camp was sacked, but Hasdrubal escaped with most of his cavalry.

The Scipio brothers continued with their policy of subjugating the Iberian tribes and raiding Carthaginian possessions. Hasdrubal lost the opportunity to reinforce Hannibal when he was at the peak of his success and an army that was ready to sail to Italy was diverted to Iberia. This effect on potential reinforcements for Hannibal has caused the historian Klaus Zimmermann to state "the Scipios' victory ... may well have been the decisive battle of the war".

== Primary sources ==
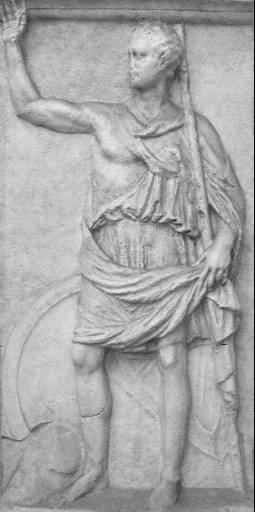
Polybius

The main source for almost every aspect of the Punic Wars (Note: The term Punic comes from the Latin word Punicus (or Poenicus), meaning “Carthaginian”, and is a reference to the Carthaginians' Phoenician ancestry.) is the historian Polybius (c. 200 – c. 118 BC), a Greek sent to Rome in 167 BC as a hostage. His works include a now-lost manual on military tactics, but he is now known for The Histories, written sometime after 146 BC. The modern consensus is to accept Polybius's accounts largely at face value, and the details of the war in modern sources are largely based on interpretations of Polybius.

Polybius's account of the Battle of Ibera has not survived, and his record of the preceding campaigns in Iberia is very fragmentary. Livy, who relied heavily on Polybius, is the other major source for this battle and the events preceding it. The classicist Adrian Goldsworthy considers Livy's "reliability is often suspect", especially with regard to his descriptions of battles, (Note: The historian Phillip Sabin refers to Livy's “military ignorance”.) and he is generally considered untrustworthy by modern historians. (Note: Sources other than Polybius are discussed by Bernard Mineo in “Principal Literary Sources for the Punic Wars (apart from Polybius)”.) Other sources include coins, inscriptions, and archaeological evidence.

== Background ==
=== Pre-war ===
The First Punic War was fought between Carthage and Rome: the two main powers of the western Mediterranean in the 3rd century BC struggled for supremacy primarily on the Mediterranean island of Sicily and its surrounding waters, and also in North Africa. The war lasted for 23 years, from 264 to 241 BC, until the Carthaginians were defeated. The Treaty of Lutatius was signed by which Carthage evacuated Sicily and paid an indemnity of 3,200 talents (Note: 3,200 talents was approximately 82,000 kg (81 long tons) of silver.) over ten years. Four years later Rome seized Sardinia and Corsica on a cynical pretence and imposed a further 1,200 talent indemnity. (Note: 1,200 talents was approximately 30,000 kg (30 long tons) of silver.) The seizure of Sardinia and Corsica by Rome and the additional indemnity fuelled resentment in Carthage. Polybius considered this act of bad faith by the Romans to be the single greatest cause of war with Carthage breaking out again nineteen years later.

Shortly after Rome's breach of the treaty the leading Carthaginian general Hamilcar Barca led many of his veterans on an expedition to expand Carthaginian holdings in south-east Iberia (modern Spain and Portugal); this was to become a quasi-monarchial, autonomous Barcid fiefdom. Carthage gained silver mines, agricultural wealth, manpower, military facilities such as shipyards and territorial depth which encouraged it to stand up to future Roman demands. Hamilcar ruled as a viceroy and was succeeded by his son-in-law, Hasdrubal, in the early 220s BC and then his son, Hannibal, in 221 BC. In 226 BC the Ebro Treaty was agreed, specifying the Ebro River as the northern boundary of the Carthaginian sphere of influence. A little later Rome made a separate treaty with the city of Saguntum, well south of the Ebro. In 219 BC a Carthaginian army under Hannibal besieged, captured and sacked Saguntum. In spring 218 BC Rome declared war on Carthage, starting the Second Punic War.

=== Carthage invades Italy ===
In 218 BC the Romans raised an army to campaign in Iberia under the brothers Gnaeus and Publius Scipio. The major Gallic tribes in Cisalpine Gaul (modern northern Italy) attacked the Romans, capturing several towns and ambushing a Roman army. The Roman Senate detached one Roman and one allied legion from the force intended for Iberia to send to the region. The Scipios had to raise fresh troops to replace these and thus could not set out for Iberia until September.

Meanwhile, Hannibal assembled a Carthaginian army in New Carthage (modern Cartagena) and entered Gaul, taking an inland route to avoid the Roman allies along the coast. Hannibal left his brother Hasdrubal Barca in charge of Carthaginian interests in Iberia. The Roman fleet carrying the Scipio brothers' army landed at Rome's ally Massalia (modern Marseille) at the mouth of the River Rhone at about the same time as Hannibal was fighting his way across the river against a force of local Allobroges at the Battle of Rhone Crossing. Hannibal evaded the Romans and Gnaeus Scipio continued to Iberia with the Roman army; Publius returned to Rome. The Carthaginians crossed the Alps early in 217 BC, taking the Romans by surprise and causing them to cancel their main campaign planned for the year, an invasion of Africa.

=== Rome invades Iberia ===
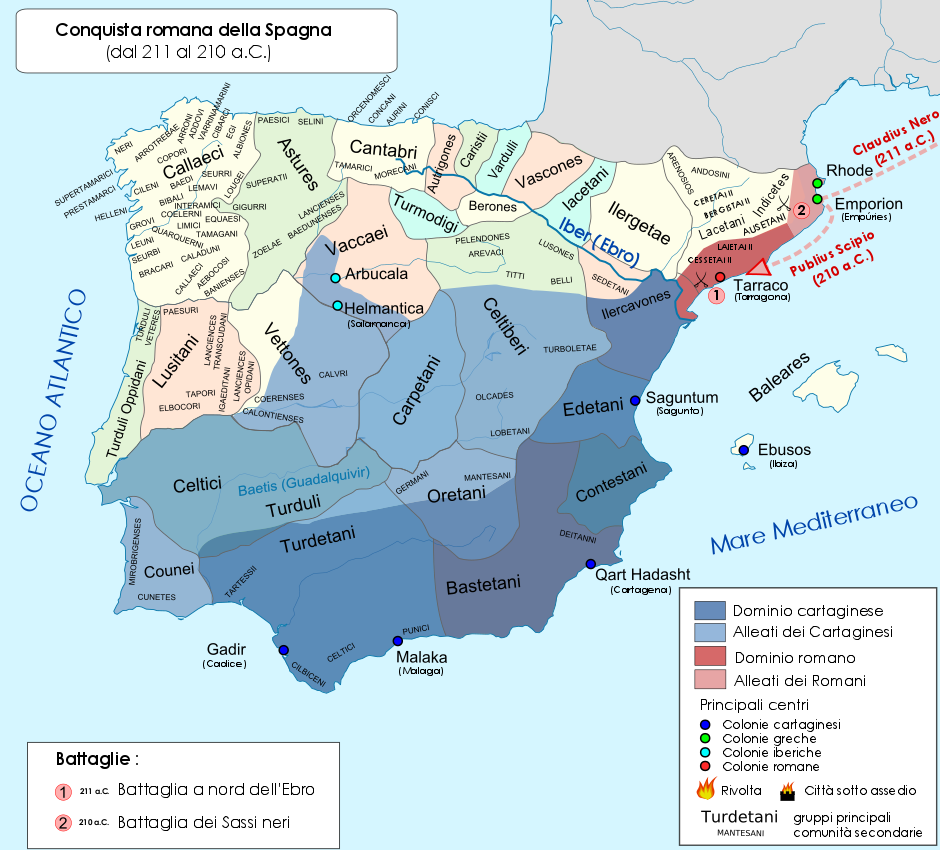
Roman controlled territory in Iberia 218–214 BC, shown in red and pink

Gnaeus Scipio continued on from Massala to Iberia, landing his army of four legions, two Roman and two allied—approximately 25,000 men—in the autumn of 218 BC at Cissa and winning support among the local tribes. The Carthaginian commander in the area, Hanno, refused to wait for Carthaginian reinforcements under Hasdrubal, attacked Scipio at the Battle of Cissa in late 218 BC and was defeated. In 217 BC, the Carthaginians moved to engage the combined Roman and Massalian fleet at the Battle of Ebro River, in which Hasdrubal launched a joint operation, advancing into the Roman controlled area in close cooperation with a fleet of 40 Carthaginian and Iberian quinqueremes. The naval component was defeated by 55 Roman and Massalian vessels at the Battle of Ebro River, with 29 Carthaginian ships were lost. In the aftermath the Carthaginian forces retreated, but the Romans remained confined to the area between the Ebro and Pyrenees. The Roman lodgement was preventing the Carthaginians from sending reinforcements from Iberia to Hannibal or to the insurgent Gauls in northern Italy.

Spanish tribes shift to Rome, 217 BC

The Carthaginian setbacks caused some of the Iberian tribes to turn against them, notably the Turdetani in the south west. While Hasdrubal was putting down this uprising, Gnaeus Scipio received 8,000 reinforcements, under his brother Publius Scipio, in 217 BC. Hasdrubal received orders from Carthage to move into Italy and join up with Hannibal to put pressure on the Romans in their homeland. Hasdrubal demurred, arguing that Carthaginian authority over the Spanish tribes was too fragile for him to move out of the south west. In 217 BC he received 4,500 reinforcements from Africa, and in 216 BC an entire army, although of unknown size. The historian of the Punic Wars Dexter Hoyos points out this was "even though [Iberia] itself was supposed to be a reservoir of first-class fighting men." Clearly the enthusiasm for Carthage of the indigenous Iberians was suspect.

== Prelude ==
Having quelled the Turdetani, Hasdrubal left his subordinate Himilco in charge at Cartagena and marched north with his field army in early 215 BC. He intended to confront the Romans and secure Spain before leaving for Italy, rather than avoiding the Romans and heading for Italy, the strategy he adopted in 207 BC. The Romans crossed the Ebro River in force and laid siege to Ibera (later known as Dertosa Ilercavonia, modern Tortosa), a small town on the south bank of the River Ebro which was allied to Carthage. Hasdrubal in turn laid siege to a Roman-aligned town and the Scipios lifted their siege and moved to engage him.

== Opposing forces ==
=== Roman ===
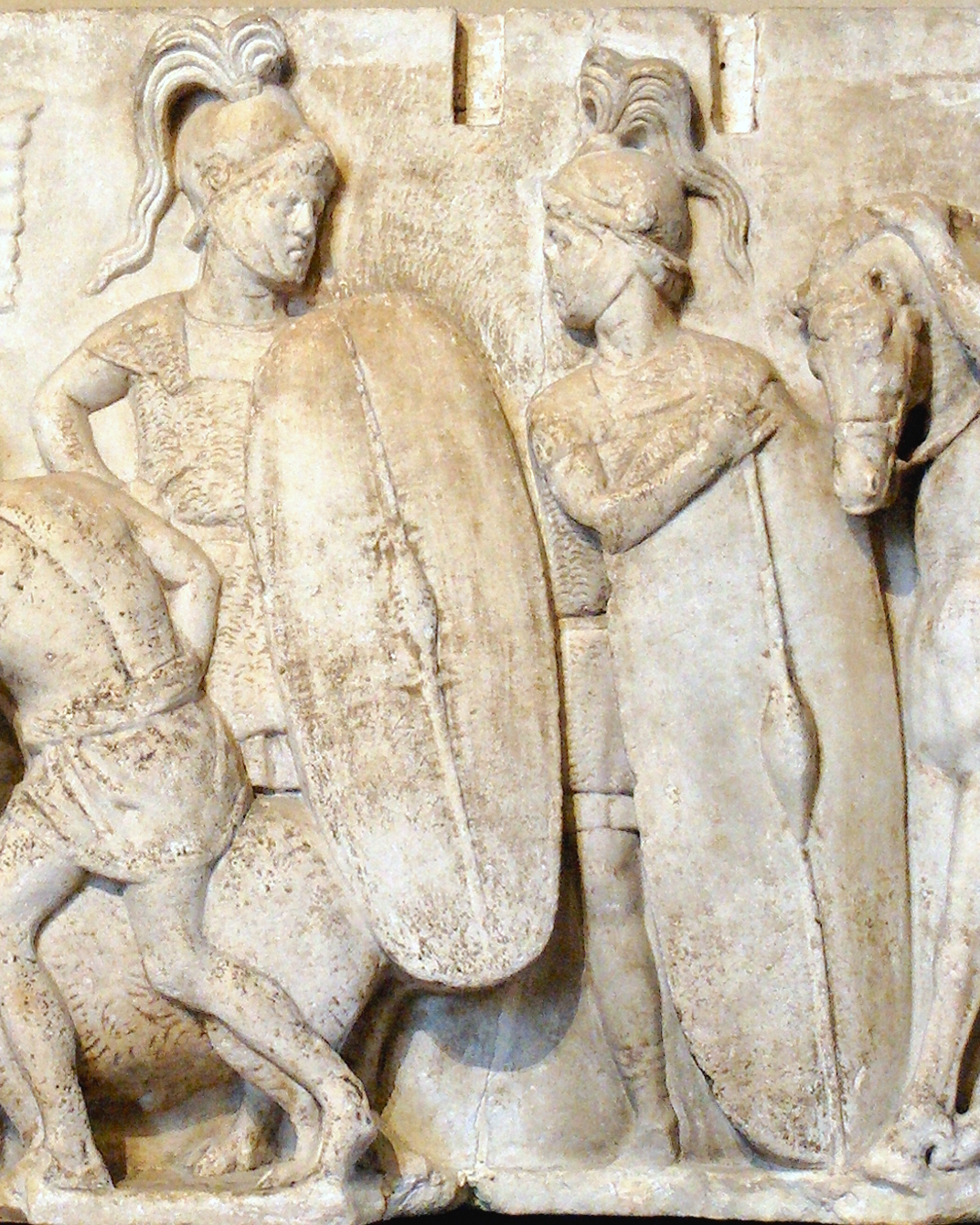
Detail from the Ahenobarbus relief showing two Roman foot-soldiers from the second century BC

Most male Roman citizens were liable for military service and would serve as infantry, a better-off minority providing a cavalry component. Traditionally, when at war the Romans would raise two legions, each of 4,200 infantry (Note: This could be increased to 5,000 in some circumstances, or, rarely, even more.) and 300 cavalry. Approximately 1,200 of the infantry, poorer or younger men unable to afford the armour and equipment of a standard legionary, served as javelin-armed skirmishers, known as velites. They carried several javelins, which would be thrown from a distance; a short sword; and a 90 centimetres (3.0 ft) shield. The balance were equipped as heavy infantry, with body armour, a large shield and short thrusting swords. They were divided into three ranks, of which the front rank also carried two javelins, while the second and third ranks had a thrusting spear instead. Both legionary sub-units and individual legionaries fought in relatively open order. It was the long-standing Roman procedure to elect two men each year, known as consuls, to each lead an army. An army was usually formed by combining a Roman legion with a similarly sized and equipped legion provided by their Latin allies; allied legions usually had a larger attached complement of cavalry than Roman ones.

The order of battle of the Roman army at Ibera is not known, but has been estimated at around 25,000; probably made up of two Roman legions, two Italian allied legions and their associated cavalry, and reinforced by an unknown number of locally recruited Iberian infantry and cavalry. It is believed to have been about the same size as the Carthaginian army.

=== Carthaginian ===
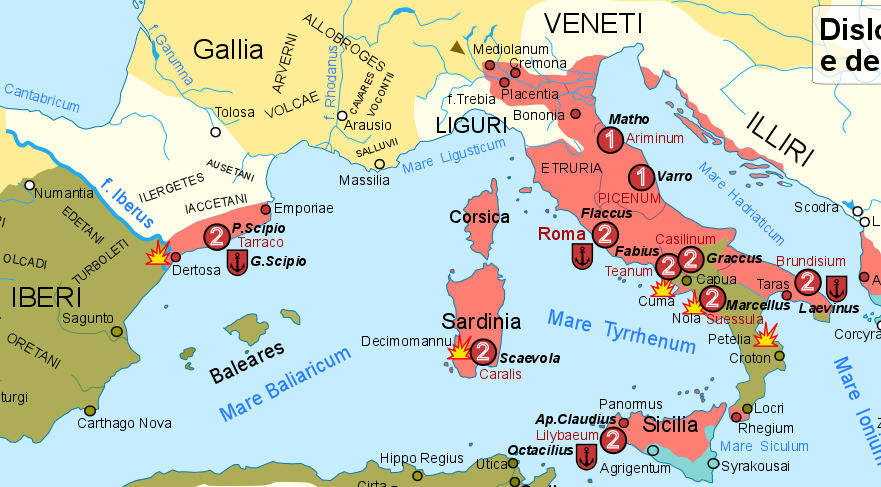
The locations of Roman legions in 215 BC; of the 18 raised, only 2 were in Iberia.

Carthage usually recruited foreigners to make up its army. Many would be from North Africa which provided several types of fighters including: close-order heavy infantry equipped with large shields, helmets, short swords and long thrusting spears; javelin-armed light infantry skirmishers; close-order shock cavalry (also known as "heavy cavalry") carrying spears; and light cavalry skirmishers who threw javelins from a distance and avoided close combat. Iberia provided large numbers of experienced infantry; unarmoured troops who would charge ferociously, but had a reputation for breaking off if a combat was protracted. Militia would sometimes be recruited from Carthaginian populated cities and colonies, and would be equipped as the North African heavy infantry. The close order North African infantry and the citizen-militia would fight in a tightly packed formation known as a phalanx. The Libyans were usually well trained but the citizen-militia were notoriously ill-trained and ill-disciplined. Slingers were frequently recruited from the Balearic Islands. The Carthaginians also employed war elephants; North Africa had indigenous African forest elephants at the time. (Note: These elephants were typically about 2.5-metre-high (8 ft) at the shoulder, and should not be confused with the larger African bush elephant.) The sources are not clear as to whether they carried towers containing fighting men.

The order of battle of the Carthaginian army at Ibera is not known in detail, but has been estimated at around 25,000 and is believed to have been about the same size as the Roman army. The Carthaginian army also had a small number of war elephants, perhaps the 21 which Hannibal left in Iberia when he set out for Italy in 218 BC.

== Battle ==
=== Deployment ===
Formal battles were usually preceded by the two armies camping one to seven miles apart (2–12 km) for days or weeks; sometimes forming up in battle order each day. In such circumstances either commander could prevent a battle from occurring, and unless both commanders were willing to at least some degree to give battle, both sides might march off without engaging. Forming up in battle order was a complicated and premeditated affair, which took several hours. Infantry were usually positioned in the centre of the battle line, with light infantry skirmishers to their front and cavalry on each flank. Many battles were decided when one side's infantry force was attacked in the flank or rear and they were partially or wholly enveloped. In 215 BC the two armies established camps about 5 miles (8.0 km) from each other on a plain probably close to Ibera. For several days both simply sent out skirmishers, declining to deploy their main forces. Finally, both armies marched out in force on the same day and deployed in battle order.

The Romans posted their troops in their traditional manner, which probably means the two Roman legions were side by side in the centre of the army, with one Italian allied legion on each side of them. Each legion would have sent its javelin-armed skirmishers out in front and formed up in their usual three lines. The cavalry were divided and placed on each wing.

Hasdrubal placed his unarmoured Iberian infantry in the centre of his line, with African heavy infantry on their left and heavy infantry described by Livy as "Poeni" (Note: The historian John Lazenby believes them to be city militia raised from the Carthaginian populated settlements in the south of Iberia. Goldsworthy also believes this is probable.) on their right; both the Africans and the Poeni would have fought in a dense phalanx formation. Libyan and Iberian cavalry were positioned on the left wing facing the Roman and Roman-allied Iberian horse, while Numidian light cavalry covered the right wing facing the allied Italian horsemen. The elephants were most probably placed at intervals in front of the infantry. The Balearic slingers and North African light infantry formed a skirmish line in front of the elephants.

=== Engagement ===
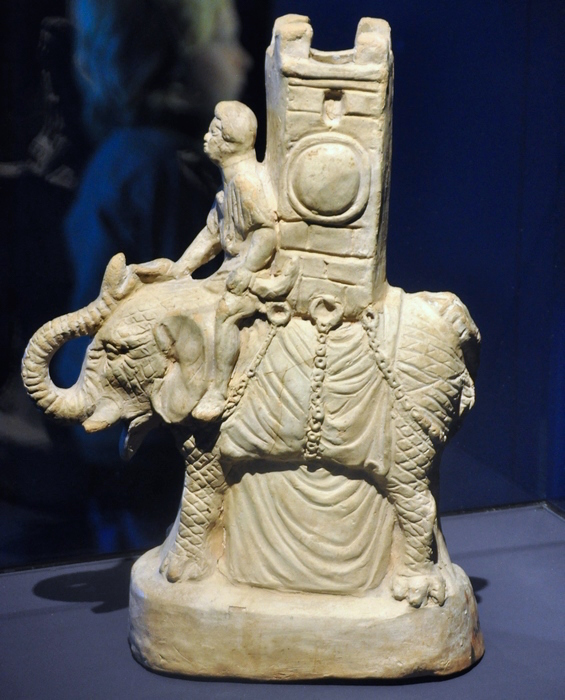
Roman statuette of a war elephant recovered from Herculaneum

Livy is unclear or silent on many details of the battle. For example, the effect, if any, of the elephants is not mentioned. At the Battle of Tunis in 255 BC, during the First Punic War, a line of Carthaginian elephants caused chaos among 13,000 Roman legionaries. In that case there were 100 elephants, not 20 or so; perhaps there were too few elephants at Ibera to strike sufficient terror into the legionaries to disrupt their formation. However the elephants were dealt with, the two Roman legions in the centre then advanced against the Iberian infantry facing them. The two sides' skirmishers exchanged missiles and withdrew behind their respective main infantry forces. The front rank of the Roman legions and the Iberians also exchanged javelins and then moved towards contact. However, the Iberians were unable to withstand the Roman attack. The Iberians promptly fled. Livy states the Iberians knew that victory would mean they would march with the rest of Hasdrubal's army to Italy and that their unwillingness to leave Iberia made them unenthusiastic fighters. Their performance has often been contrasted with the resolute showing of Hannibal's Iberian infantry similarly in the centre of his line at the Battle of Cannae in the same year, although in their case, they had experienced several victories with Hannibal during the previous three years; whereas Hasdrubal had suffered several defeats. The Romans took advantage of their flight, and pushed through the sudden gap in the Carthaginian formation.

An indecisive skirmish developed on both wings of the armies between the opposing cavalry, with neither side gaining any advantage. Meanwhile, the strong blocks of North African and Poeni heavy infantry on either side of the Iberians partially turned and engaged the flanks of the two Roman legions. But the Carthaginians also had to each face an allied legion to their front. Meanwhile, the Roman legions maintained discipline, and did not pursue the fleeing Iberians, but wheeled to attack the rears of the two Carthaginian units. Thus enveloped, the Carthaginians were in a hopeless situation. The Libyan infantry managed to put up a hard resistance, inflicting and suffering heavy casualties before being routed. The Carthaginian cavalry and their elephants fled the field, having suffered few casualties. The Romans attacked and looted the Carthaginian camp, and the Carthaginian's provisions, equipment and treasury fell into their hands.

== Aftermath ==
Campaigns in Spain after the Battle of Ibera, 215 BC

The casualties suffered by each side are unclear: the modern historian John Lazenby, basing himself on Livy, states the Carthaginians were almost annihilated; Nigel Bagnall writes that Carthaginian casualties were heavy; and Richard Miles that the Carthaginians suffered a heavy defeat. However, the fact that in other battles in Iberia where Polybius's more reliable account has survived Livy's record of Carthaginian casualties is up to five times greater than those given by Polybius calls his assessment into doubt. Hasdrubal survived the battle with most of his elephants and cavalry, and a few infantry (mostly Iberians). Ibera probably surrendered to the Romans after the battle. The shattered Carthaginian army retired to Cartagena, leaving the Romans firmly established in north-east Iberia and blocking the overland route to Italy.

The Scipio brothers did not mount an immediate campaign against the Carthaginians. They continued their strategy of raids, instigating Iberian tribes to rebel, and building up their power base. This was largely because the Battle of Cannae was fought in Italy at approximately the same time and turned out disastrously for the Romans; for several years they concentrated their manpower and resources on safeguarding their homeland, leaving nothing for Iberia. On at least one occasion the Scipios complained to the Senate regarding this lack of reinforcement. They would fight on in Iberia with varying results until 212 BC, when the Romans were heavily defeated at the Battle of the Upper Baetis and both of the Scipios were killed.

=== Strategic importance ===
The Scipios' victory confirmed the Carthaginian inability to reinforce Hannibal overland, robbed him of anticipated seaborne reinforcements, and further weakened the Carthaginian hold on the Iberian tribes. Hannibal's youngest brother, Mago, had marched into Italy with him in 218 BC, but then been sent back to Carthage to gather reinforcements. He raised an army which was meant to land at Locri in Italy in 215 BC, but was diverted to Iberia after the Carthaginian defeat at Ibera. The classicist Howard Scullard is of the opinion that the Romans' victory prevented them from being expelled from Iberia, not least because the Iberian tribes would have abandoned Rome; and prevented Hasdrubal from promptly marching at full strength to reinforce Hannibal in Italy, where "Rome could hardly withstand the double force." Klaus Zimmermann agrees: "the Scipios' victory ... may well have been the decisive battle of the war"

== Notes, citations and sources ==
=== Sources ===
- Bagnall, Nigel (1999). The Punic Wars: Rome, Carthage and the Struggle for the Mediterranean. London: Pimlico. ISBN 978-0-7126-6608-4.
- Barceló, Pedro (2015) [2011]. "Punic Politics, Economy, and Alliances, 218–201". In Hoyos, Dexter (ed.). A Companion to the Punic Wars. Chichester, West Sussex: John Wiley. pp. 357–375. ISBN 978-1-119-02550-4.
- Champion, Craige B. (2015) [2011]. "Polybius and the Punic Wars". In Hoyos, Dexter (ed.). A Companion to the Punic Wars. Chichester, West Sussex: John Wiley. pp. 95–110. ISBN 978-1-1190-2550-4.
- Collins, Roger (1998). Spain: An Oxford Archaeological Guide. Oxford University Press. ISBN 978-0-19-285300-4.
- Edwell, Peter (2015) [2011]. "War Abroad: Spain, Sicily, Macedon, Africa". In Hoyos, Dexter (ed.). A Companion to the Punic Wars. Chichester, West Sussex: John Wiley. pp. 320–338. ISBN 978-1-119-02550-4.
- Fronda, Michael P. (2011). "Hannibal: Tactics, Strategy, and Geostrategy". In Hoyos, Dexter (ed.). A Companion to the Punic Wars. Oxford: Wiley-Blackwell. pp. 242–259. ISBN 978-1-405-17600-2.
- Goldsworthy, Adrian (2006). The Fall of Carthage: The Punic Wars 265–146 BC. London: Phoenix. ISBN 978-0-304-36642-2.
- Hoyos, Dexter (2005). Hannibal's Dynasty: Power and Politics in the Western Mediterranean, 247-183 BC. New York: Routledge. ISBN 978-0-415-35958-0.
- Hoyos, Dexter (2015) [2011]. A Companion to the Punic Wars. Chichester, West Sussex: John Wiley. ISBN 978-1-1190-2550-4.
- Hoyos, Dexter (2015b). Mastering the West: Rome and Carthage at War. Oxford: Oxford University Press. ISBN 978-0-19-986010-4.
- Koon, Sam (2015) [2011]. "Phalanx and Legion: the "Face" of Punic War Battle". In Hoyos, Dexter (ed.). A Companion to the Punic Wars. Chichester, West Sussex: John Wiley. pp. 77–94. ISBN 978-1-1190-2550-4.
- Lazenby, John (1996). The First Punic War: A Military History. Stanford, California: Stanford University Press. ISBN 978-0-8047-2673-3.
- Lazenby, John (1998). Hannibal's War: A Military History of the Second Punic War. Warminster: Aris & Phillips. ISBN 978-0-85668-080-9.
- Mahaney, W.C. (2008). Hannibal's Odyssey: Environmental Background to the Alpine Invasion of Italia. Piscataway, New Jersey: Gorgias Press. ISBN 978-1-59333-951-7.
- Miles, Richard (2011). Carthage Must be Destroyed. London: Penguin. ISBN 978-0-14-101809-6.
- Mineo, Bernard (2015) [2011]. "Principal Literary Sources for the Punic Wars (apart from Polybius)". In Hoyos, Dexter (ed.). A Companion to the Punic Wars. Chichester, West Sussex: John Wiley. pp. 111–128. ISBN 978-1-1190-2550-4.
- Sabin, Philip (1996). "The Mechanics of Battle in the Second Punic War". Bulletin of the Institute of Classical Studies. Supplement. 67 (67): 59–79. JSTOR 43767903.
- Scullard, Howard H. (1930). Scipio Africanus in the Second Punic War. Cambridge: Cambridge University Press. OCLC 185176196.
- Scullard, Howard H. (2006) [1989]. "Carthage and Rome". In Walbank, F. W.; Astin, A. E.; Frederiksen, M. W. & Ogilvie, R. M. (eds.). Cambridge Ancient History: Volume 7, Part 2, 2nd Edition. Cambridge: Cambridge University Press. pp. 486–569. ISBN 978-0-521-23446-7.
- Shutt, Rowland (1938). "Polybius: A Sketch". Greece & Rome. 8 (22): 50–57. doi:10.1017/S001738350000588X. JSTOR 642112.
- Sidwell, Keith C.; Jones, Peter V. (1998). The World of Rome: an Introduction to Roman Culture. Cambridge: Cambridge University Press. ISBN 978-0-521-38600-5.
- Tipps, G.K. (1985). "The Battle of Ecnomus". Historia: Zeitschrift für Alte Geschichte. 34 (4): 432–465. JSTOR 4435938.
- Walbank, F.W. (1990). Polybius. Vol. 1. Berkeley: University of California Press. ISBN 978-0-520-06981-7.
- Zimmermann, Klaus (2015) [2011]. "Roman Strategy and Aims in the Second Punic War". In Hoyos, Dexter (ed.). A Companion to the Punic Wars. Oxford: Wiley-Blackwell. pp. 280–298. ISBN 978-1-405-17600-2.
