= Judith at the Banquet of Holofernes =

1634 painting by Rembrandt

Judith
- Artist: Rembrandt
- Year: 1634
- Medium: Oil on canvas
- Dimensions: 142 cm × 152 cm (56 in × 60 in)
- Location: Museo del Prado, Madrid

Judith at the Banquet of Holofernes (also known as Artemisia Receiving Mausolus' Ashes and Sophonisba Receiving the Poisoned Cup) is a painting by the Dutch master Rembrandt. It is now in the Museo del Prado in Madrid, Spain. It is signed "REMBRANDT F: 1634".

The subject of the picture was unclear for centuries. It portrays a young woman, formerly identified as Sophonisba or Artemisia, or a generic queen due to her jewels and rich garments, receiving a cup from a maiden. Today it is considered to be Judith at the banquet of Holofernes.

For the woman, Rembrandt probably used his wife Saskia as model.

== In literature ==
The painting is the subject of an extended meditation in Spanish author Javier Marías's 1992 novel Corazón tan blanco (published in English as A Heart So White), in which a character reflects on the painting's dual iconographic reading—as either Artemisia of Caria or Sophonisba—while another character, a museum guard, threatens to destroy the painting with a cigarette lighter.

== See also ==
- List of paintings by Rembrandt
