= Cassandre (opera) =

Opera by Toussaint Bertin de la Doué and François Bouvard

Cassandre (Cassandra) is an opera by the French composers Toussaint Bertin de la Doué and François Bouvard, first performed at the Académie Royale de Musique (the Paris Opera) on 18 February 1706. It takes the form of a tragédie en musique in a prologue and five acts. The libretto, by François Joseph Lagrange-Chancel, is based on the Oresteia by Aeschylus.

== Sources ==
- (in French) Libretto at "Livrets baroques"
- (in French) Félix Clément and Pierre Larousse Dictionnaire des Opéras, Paris, 1881, page 141.
