= Médus =

Médus, roi des Mèdes (Medus, King of the Medes) is an opera by the French composer François Bouvard, first performed at the Académie Royale de Musique (the Paris Opera) on 23 July 1702. It takes the form of a tragédie en musique in a prologue and five acts. The libretto is by François Joseph Lagrange-Chancel.

== Sources ==
- (in French) Libretto at "Livrets baroques"
- (in French) Félix Clément and Pierre Larousse Dictionnaire des Opéras, Paris, 1881, page 448.
