= Adherbal roy de Numidie =

Tragedy by François Joseph Lagrange-Chancel

Adherbal roy de Numidie is a tragedy by French dramatist François Joseph Lagrange-Chancel (1677–1758) who gave the first presentation of this work on 8 January 1694 when he was 16. It is based on the life of Adherbal, King of Numidia from 118 to 112 BC. It was translated into Dutch by Rudolph Marcus in 1759 under the title Jugurtha.

== See also ==
- 17th-century French literature
- Theatre of France
