= Battle of Ebro River =

217 BC naval battle between the Romans and the Carthaginians

- Part of the Second Punic War
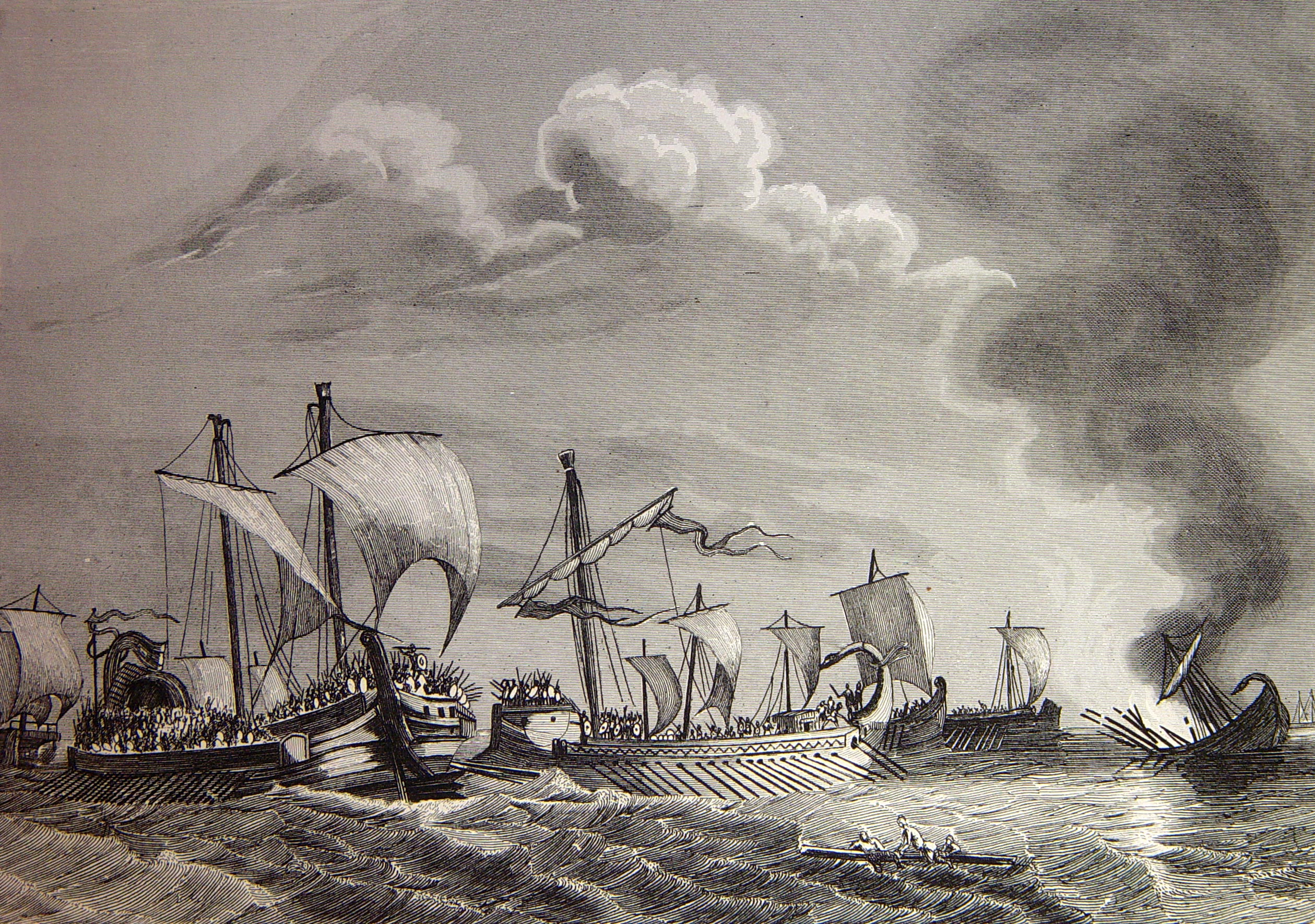
- 1852 illustration of the battle
Date	Spring, 217 BC
Location	Mouth of Ebro River, present-day Catalonia, Spain 40°43′12″N 0°51′47″E
Result	Roman victory

Belligerents
Roman Republic; Massalia	Carthage

Commanders and leaders
Scipio Calvus	Himilco

Strength
35 Quinqueremes and 20 Triremes	40 Quinqueremes

Casualties and losses
Unknown	29 quinqueremes 4 sunk 25 captured

The Battle of Ebro River was a naval battle fought near the mouth of Ebro River in the spring of 217 BC between a Carthaginian fleet of approximately 40 quinqueremes, under the command of Himilco, and a Roman fleet of 35 ships, under Gnaeus Cornelius Scipio Calvus. Hasdrubal Barca, the Carthaginian commander in Iberia, had launched a joint expedition to destroy the Roman base north of the Ebro River. The Carthaginian naval contingent was totally defeated after a surprise attack by the Roman ships, losing 29 ships and the control of seas around Iberia. The reputation of the Romans was further enhanced in Iberia after this victory, causing rebellion among some of the Iberian tribes under Carthaginian control.

== Prelude ==
After Hanno's defeat in the Battle of Cissa in the winter of 218 BC, Gnaeus Scipio had spent his time consolidating his hold on the Iberian regions north of the Ebro and raiding the Iberian territory of Carthage south of the Ebro from his base at Tarraco. He had received no major reinforcements from Rome to augment his forces. Meanwhile, Hasdrubal Barca, the Carthaginian commander in Iberia, had raised a number of Iberian levies to expand his army substantially. The Punic naval contingent in Iberia contained 32 quinqueremes and 5 triremes in 218 BC when Hannibal had departed from Iberia. During the winter of 218 BC, Hasdrubal had added a further 10 quinqueremes to this fleet and trained additional crews to man them. In the Spring of 217 BC, Hasdrubal mounted a joint expedition towards the Roman territory north of the Ebro. Hasdrubal himself commanded the army, the exact number of which is unknown, and his deputy Himilco led the fleet. The expedition followed the coastline, with the ships beaching beside the army at night.

Gnaeus Scipio, fearing that the Carthaginian army outnumbered his own, resolved to fight a naval battle; though he could only man 35 quinqueremes (25 ships were sent back to Italy after a Carthaginian raid in late 218 caused severe casualties among the crews, and some sailors may have been posted in garrisons) however, the Romans were supported by 20 ships from Massalia.

== Battle ==
After reaching the Ebro River, the Carthaginian fleet anchored near the estuary. The sailors and crew left their ships for foraging, as the fleet lacked transports carrying provisions. Although Hasdrubal had posted scouts to detect the activities of the Romans, Himilco had no ships out at sea scouting for Roman ships. A pair of Massalian ships located the Punic fleet as it lay at anchor, and slipped away undetected to warn Gnaeus of the Carthaginian presence. The Roman fleet sailed from Tarraco and was positioned only 10 miles to the north of the Carthaginian position when the warnings reached Gnaeus Scipio. Gnaeus manned his ships with picked legionaries, and now sailed down to attack the Punic fleet.

Hasdrubal's army scouts detected the approaching Roman fleet before the Punic navy and warned their fleet of the coming danger through fire signals. Most of the crews had been foraging, and they hastily had to man their ships and sail out in a disorderly manner. There was little coordination and some ships were undermanned because of the surprise achieved by the Romans. As Himilco sailed out, Hasdrubal drew up his army on the shore to give encouragement to his fleet.

Gnaeus Scipio's raids in Spain, 217 BC

The combat effectiveness of the Carthaginians is not reflected in the number of ships as one-quarter of their fleet had newly trained crew. The Romans formed 2 lines with the 35 Roman ships in front and the 20 Massalian ships behind them, with the formation and the naval skill of the Massalians nullifying the superior manoeuvrability of the Carthaginian fleet. The Romans engaged the Carthaginian ships as they came out of the river, ramming and sinking four of them and boarding and capturing two more. The Carthaginian crews then lost heart, beached their ships and sought safety among the army. The Romans grappled and hauled away 23 of the beached ships.

== Aftermath and importance ==
The defeat proved to be decisive in the long run. Hasdrubal was obliged to march back to Cartagena, fearing seaborne attacks on Carthaginian territories. With the Iberian contingent of the Carthaginian navy shattered, Hasdrubal was forced to either call Carthage for reinforcements or build new ships. He did neither. The performance of the Iberian crews had been poor in the battle, and their dismissal would spark a rebellion in the Turdetani tribe, forcing Carthage to send 4,000 infantry and 500 cavalry to Hasdrubal. Hasdrubal would spend all of 216 BC subduing the rebels.

Hasdrubal's possible retreat towards Castulo after the Battle of Ebro River, as described by Livy

In 217 BC, the main Carthaginian fleet captured a supply fleet headed for Iberia off Cosa in Italy. Publius Cornelius Scipio arrived in Iberia with 8,000 soldiers in the fall of that year with instructions from the Roman Senate to prevent any help from reaching Hannibal in Italy from Iberia. This is the only reinforcement the Roman Republic would send to Iberia before 211 BC. The Scipio brothers would raid Carthaginian Iberia, and meet Hasdrubal at the Battle of Dertosa in 215 BC.

Gnaeus Scipio had ensured that Roman seaborne supplies would not be intercepted by Carthaginian ships based in Iberia, and that the Roman fleet in Iberia could raid the Carthaginian domain at will. The only major naval expedition against the Romans from Iberia would be that of Mago Barca to Italy in 204 BC.

== Sources ==
- Bagnall, Nigel (1990). The Punic Wars. Macmillan. ISBN 0-312-34214-4.
- Cottrell, Leonard (1992). Hannibal: Enemy of Rome. Da Capo Press. ISBN 0-306-80498-0.
- Lazenby, John Francis (1978). Hannibal's War. Aris & Phillips. ISBN 0-85668-080-X.
- Goldsworthy, Adrian (2003). The Fall of Carthage. Cassel Military Paperbacks. ISBN 0-304-36642-0.
- Peddie, John (2005). Hannibal's War. Sutton Publishing Limited. ISBN 0-7509-3797-1.
- Lancel, Serge (1999). Hannibal. Blackwell Publishers. ISBN 0-631-21848-3.
- Baker, G. P. (1999). Hannibal. Cooper Square Press. ISBN 0-8154-1005-0.

=== Further reading ===
- Dodge, Theodore A. (1891). Hannibal. Da Capo Press. ISBN 0-306-81362-9.
- Warry, John (1993). Warfare in the Classical World. Salamander Books Ltd. ISBN 1-56619-463-6.
- Livius, Titus (1972). The War with Hannibal. Penguin Books. ISBN 0-14-044145-X.
- Delbruck, Hans (1990). Warfare in Antiquity, Volume 1. University of Nebraska Press. ISBN 0-8032-9199-X.
- Lancel, Serge (1997). Carthage: A History. Blackwell Publishers. ISBN 1-57718-103-4.
