= François Joseph Lagrange-Chancel =

French dramatist (1677–1758)

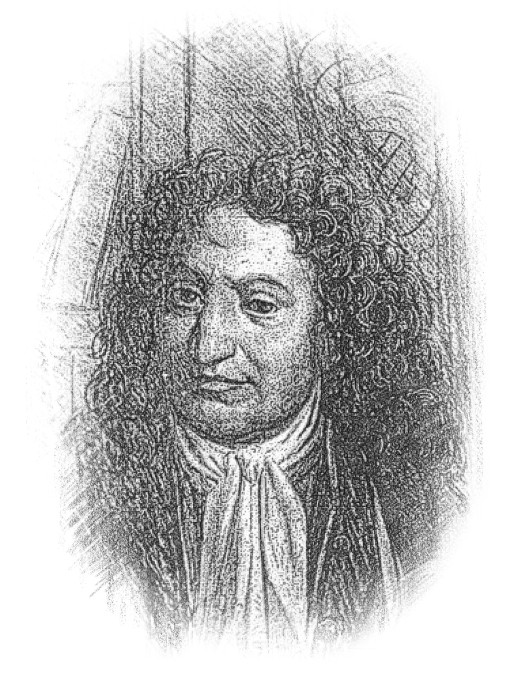
- Born: 1 January 1677; Razac-sur-l'Isle, Périgord
- Died: 26 December 1758 (aged 81); Razac-sur-l'Isle
- Occupations: Playwright; Poet

François Joseph Lagrange-Chancel (January 1, 1677 – December 26, 1758) was a French playwright and satirist.

== Biography ==
He was an extremely precocious boy, and at Bordeaux in Gascony, where he was educated, he produced a play when he was nine years old. Five years later his mother took him to Paris, where he found a patron. in the princesse de Conti, to whom he dedicated his tragedy of Jugurtha or, as it was called later, Adherbal (1694). Racine had given him advice and was present at the first performance, although he had long lived in complete retirement. Other plays followed: Oreste et Pylade (1697), Méleagre (1699), Amasis (1701), and Ino et Mélicerte (1715).

Lagrange hardly realized the high hopes raised by his precocity, although his only serious rival on the tragic stage was Campistron, but he obtained high favour at court, becoming maître d'hôtel to the duchess of Orléans.

This prosperity ended with the publication in 1720 of his Philippiques, odes accusing the regent, Philip, duke of Orléans, of the most odious crimes, such as committing incest with his eldest daughter, Marie Louise Élisabeth d'Orléans, Duchess of Berry, a debauched young widow rumored to have hidden several pregnancies by her father and who died at age 23, her health prematurely destroyed by her secret maternities. Lagrange might have escaped the consequences of this libel but for the bitter enmity of a former patron, the duc de La Force. He found sanctuary at Avignon, but was enticed beyond the boundary of the papal jurisdiction, when he was arrested and sent as a prisoner to the Île Sainte-Marguerite.

He contrived, however, to escape to Sardinia and thence to Spain and Holland, where he produced his fourth and fifth Philippiques. On the death of the Regent he was able to return to France. He was part author of a Histoire de Périgord left unfinished, and made a further contribution to history, or perhaps, more exactly, to romance, in a letter to Élie Fréron on the identity of the Man with the Iron Mask. Lagrange's family life was embittered by a long lawsuit against his son. He died at Périgueux at the end of December 1758.

He had collected his own works (5 vols, 1758) some months before his death. His most famous work, the Philippiques, was edited by M. de Lescure in 1858, and a sixth philippic by M. Diancourt in 1886.

== Works ==
=== Literary legacy ===
When Lagrange-Chancel appeared in Paris, some wanted to see in him the successor to Racine. But none of his plays - some of which were successful - justified hopes. The best of them, Amasis, suffers from the comparison with the Merope (1743) by Voltaire, on the same subject. "If the author has a sense of theater and dramatic situations, the characters are cold and false and versification is hard and prosaic" (Gustave Vapereau).

The Philippics are not without talent and are animated by a breath, but it's one of hatred and more exaggeration than poetry.

=== Theatre ===
- 1694: Adherbal roy de Numidie (ou Jurgurtha), tragedy, presented 8 January
- 1697: Oreste et Pylade, tragedy,
- 1699: Méléagre, tragedy,
- 1699: Athénaïs, tragedy,
- 1701: Amasis, tragedy,
- 1702: Médus, Roi des Mèdes, tragédie lyrique in 5 acts and a prologue, music by François Bouvard, presented at the Académie royale de musique, 23 July
- 1703: Alceste, tragedy
- 1706: Cassandre, tragédie lyrique, presented at the Académie royale de musique, 22 June
- 1713: Ino et Mélicerte, tragedy,
- 1713: La Fille supposée, comedy in five acts in verse, presented without success at the Théâtre-Français, 11 May, not printed.
- 1717: Ariane, tragédie lyrique in 5 acts and one prologue, in collaboration with Pierre-Charles Roy, music by Jean-Joseph Mouret, presented at the Académie royale de musique, 6 April
- 1729: Les Jeux olympiques ou le prince malade, comédie héroïque, premiered at the Comédie-Italienne, 12 November
- 1731: Erigone, tragedy played in Versailles 20 December. This play was not successful
- 1732: Cassius et Victorinus, martyrs, Christian tragedy after Grégoire de Tours, presented 6 October
- 1736: Orphée, tragedy in machinery, not shown,
- La Mort d'Ulysse, tragedy, not shown,
- Le Crime puni, tragedy, not shown, which appears in the 4th volume of the works of Chancel. It is an imitation of Dom Juan ou le Festin de pierre.

== Bibliography ==
- de la Grange-Chancel, François-Joseph (1758). Œuvres de monsieur de la Grange-Chancel. Vol. 5. Paris: Les libraires associés. OCLC 492617663.
- de Léris, Antoine (1763). Dictionnaire portatif et historique des théâtres. Paris: C. A. Jombert. OCLC 11629597.
- Vapereau, Gustave (1876). Dictionnaire universel des littératures. Paris: Hachette Filipacchi Médias. OCLC 301750693.
