= Ariane (Mouret) =

Ariane (Ariadne) is an opera by the French composer Jean-Joseph Mouret, first performed at the Académie Royale de Musique (the Paris Opera) on 6 April 1717. It takes the form of a tragédie en musique in a prologue and five acts. The libretto is by François Joseph Lagrange-Chancel and Pierre-Charles Roy.

== Sources ==
- (in French) Félix Clément and Pierre Larousse Dictionnaire des Opéras, Paris, 1881, page 48.
