= Battle of the Upper Baetis =

211 BCE battle during the Second Punic War

- Part of the Second Punic War
Date	211 BC
Location	Near Upper Baetis (modern-day Guadalquivir) River, Spain 38°2′33″N 3°37′28.5″W
Result	Carthaginian victory

Belligerents
Carthage	Roman Republic

Commanders and leaders
Hasdrubal Barca; Mago Barca; Hasdrubal Gisco; Masinissa	Publius Cornelius Scipio †; Gnaeus Cornelius Scipio †

Strength
Unknown total 12,000+ infantry 1,500+ cavalry 3,000 Numidian cavalry 7,500 Iberians	50,000 30,000 Romans and allies 20,000 Celtiberian mercenaries (deserted)

Casualties and losses
Unknown	21,000–22,000 killed or captured
- Location within Spain

The Battle of the Upper Baetis was a double battle, comprising the battles of Castulo and Ilorca, fought in 211 BC during the Second Punic War between a Carthaginian force led by Hasdrubal Barca (Hannibal's brother) and a Roman force led by Publius Cornelius Scipio and his brother Gnaeus. The immediate result was a Carthaginian victory in which both Roman brothers were killed. Before this defeat, the brothers had spent seven years (218–211 BC) campaigning against the Carthaginians in Hispania, thus limiting the resources available to Hannibal, who was simultaneously fighting the Romans in Italy.

== Background ==
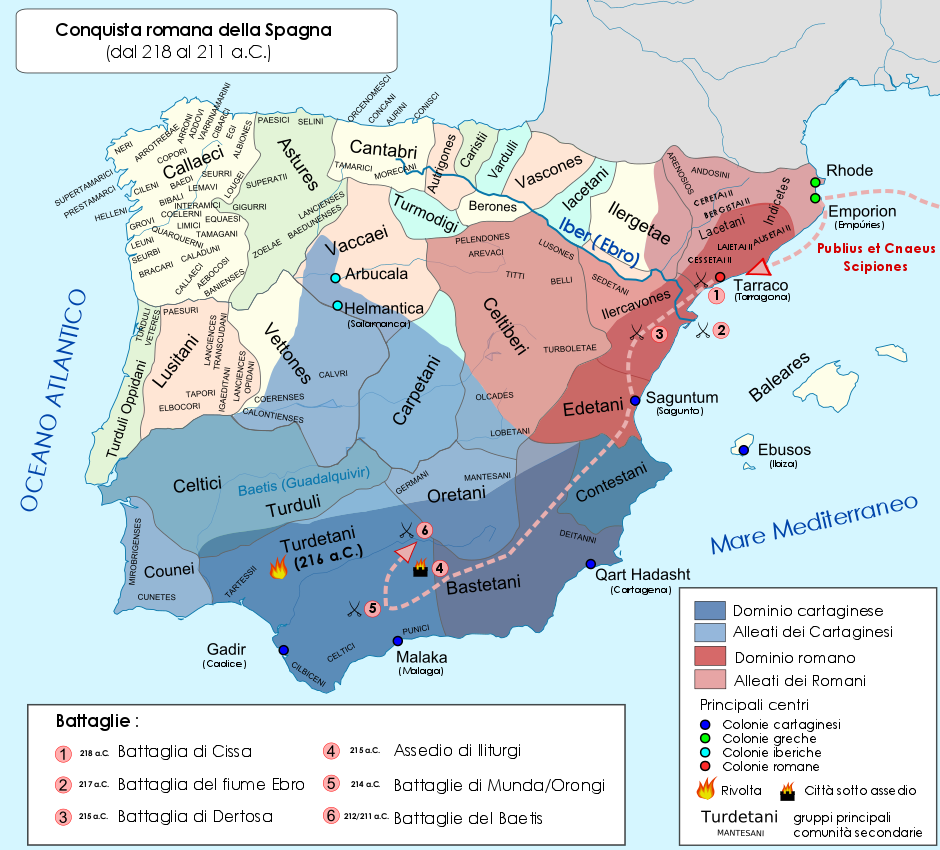
Roman operations in Spain, 218–211 BC. Included are several probably ahistorical engagements.

After the defeat of Hasdrubal Barca in the Battle of Dertosa in the spring of 215 BC, the Romans had secured their bases north of the Ebro. They then proceeded to win over some Iberian tribes in the region. Both the Romans and Carthaginians faced and put down Iberian tribal revolts. The Scipios received no reinforcement from Italy, where Hannibal had the Romans hard pressed. Due to a lack of support from Rome, the Scipios mounted no decisive operations against the Carthaginians in 214–213 BC. In 215 BC, the brothers had complained about the lack of Roman supplies and finance for their army. The Roman Senate responded by sending private companies to supply their forces. Two of these merchants, Pomponius and Postumius, turned out to be criminals who cheated the Scipios of their money. In 214 BC, Rome suffered a financial crisis as a result of the strains of war, increasing the Scipios' funding troubles. Despite the lack of any reinforcement or renewed funding, the Scipios went over to the offensive in 212 BC, re-capturing Saguntum, which had been lost to Hannibal in 219 BC.

Meanwhile, Hasdrubal had been reinforced by two armies, led respectively by his younger brother, Mago Barca, and Hasdrubal Gisco. According to Livy, the Romans fought multiple battles against the Carthaginians south of the Ebro from 215–214 BC, at Iliturgi, Munda, and Orongi. Livy's chronology is confused and contradicted by Polybius, who explicitly states that the Scipio brothers did not venture south of the Ebro until 212 BC. As a result, most historians consider these engagements to be ahistorical.

The Scipios had persuaded Syphax, a Numidian king, to open hostilities against Carthage with an army that had been trained by Statorius, a Roman centurion, in 213 or 212 BC. On the whole, the situation in Iberia was stable enough for Hasdrubal Barca to shift his attention to Africa in 213/212 BC in order to put down this rebellion. Hasdrubal Barca returned to Iberia in late 212 BC, bringing with him 3,000 Numidians under Masinissa, the future king of Numidia.

== Prelude ==
In 212 BC, the Scipio brothers captured Castulo, a major mining town and the home of Hannibal's wife Imilce. They then wintered at Castulo and Ilugia.

The brothers hired 20,000 Celtiberian mercenaries to reinforce their army of 30,000 Romans. The Romans' strength had been reduced by losses sustained against the Carthaginians and Iberian tribes since 218 BC and the need to garrison the main Roman base at Tarraco. Observing that the Carthaginian armies were deployed separately from each other, with Hasdrubal Barca's army near Amtorgis; and, further to the west, Mago Barca with 13,500 men alongside Hasdrubal Gisco's army, the Scipio brothers decided to divide their forces. Publius Scipio led Roman and allied soldiers to attack Mago Barca near Castulo, while Gnaeus Scipio took one-third of the Roman army in Spain and the mercenaries to attack Hasdrubal Barca. This stratagem would lead to two battles, the Battle of Castulo and the Battle of Ilorca, which took place within a few days of each other.

Gnaeus Scipio arrived at his objective first. However, Hasdrubal Barca had already ordered the armies of Indibilis and Mandonius (Iberian chieftains friendly to the Carthaginians) and Hasdrubal Gisco to join Mago near Castulo. Hasdrubal Barca held his ground against Gnaeus Scipio, staying within his fortified camp, then managed to bribe the Celtiberian mercenaries to desert Gnaeus Scipio. This led to Hasdrubal's army outnumbering that of Gnaeus Scipio. Hasdrubal bided his time, avoiding any battles with the Romans.

== Battle of Castulo ==
As Publius Scipio neared Castulo, he was harassed day and night by the Numidian light cavalry under Masinissa. When informed that Indibilis was moving across his line of retreat with 7,500 Iberians, Publius Scipio decided not to face Mago but to attack the Iberian chieftain, fearing that he would be surrounded by Carthaginian forces. Leaving 2,000 soldiers in his camp under the legate Tiberius Fonteus, he marched out that night to launch an attack on the Iberians and, hopefully, evade Masinissa's cavalry. Scipio marched throughout the night and caught Indibilis and his men by surprise in the early morning; and, with a numerical superiority, began to gain the upper hand in the ensuing action. However, the Iberians managed to hold off the Romans in the confused night battle just long enough for Masinissa to arrive.

With the Numidian cavalry attacking from the flank, the Roman assault on the Iberians began to slacken. When Mago and Hasdrubal Gisco arrived with their combined armies, the Romans finally, after a grim struggle, broke and fled, leaving Publius Scipio and most of their comrades dead on the field. Mago gave the Numidians enough time to loot the dead before marching the army towards Hasdrubal Barca's position. A handful of Roman survivors managed to reach their camp.

== Battle of Ilorca ==
Gnaeus Scipio had lost the advantage of numbers with the desertion of the mercenaries. Although unaware of Publius Scipio's fate, Gnaeus decided to withdraw towards northern Iberia after Mago and Hasdrubal Gisco arrived with their armies. The Romans moved out of their camp, leaving their campfires burning, and made for the Ebro at night. The Numidians located them the following day; their attacks forced the Romans to take position for the night on a hilltop near Ilorca. The main Carthaginian army, which now comprised the forces of Hasdrubal Barca, Hasdrubal Gisco, and Mago, arrived during the night. In desperation, the Romans tried to create a defensive wall with baggage and saddles, as the ground was too stony for digging. The Carthaginians easily overran this, and Gnaeus was killed in the fighting; most of his army was destroyed.

== Aftermath ==
The Roman fugitives fled north of the Ebro, where they eventually gathered a hodge-podge army of 8,000–9,000 soldiers. The Carthaginian commanders made no coordinated attempts to wipe out these survivors and then send help to Hannibal. In late 211 BC, Rome sent 13,100 troops under Claudius Nero to reinforce its forces in Iberia. Nero scored no spectacular victories, nor did the Carthaginians launch any coordinated assault on the Romans in Iberia. With the arrival of Publius Cornelius Scipio Africanus, the son of Publius Scipio, with another 10,000 troops in 210 BC, the Carthaginians would come to regret their earlier inaction when engaging in the Battle of Cartagena in 209 BC.

With the Carthaginian armies in Iberia failing to eliminate the Romans, Hannibal would not get any reinforcements from Iberia during the crucial year of 211 BC, when the Romans were besieging Capua.
