= François Bouvard =

French composer (c. 1684–1760)

François Bouvard (c. 1684–1760) was a French composer of the Baroque era. Originally from Lyon, Lyonnais, Bouvard began his career as a singer at the Paris Opéra at the age of sixteen. When the quality of his voice deteriorated, he went to study in Rome and devoted himself to playing the violin and composition. His first opera, the tragédie en musique Médus, appeared in Paris in 1702.

== Works ==
=== Operas ===
- Médus, roi des Mèdes (tragédie en musique, 1702)
- Cassandre (tragédie en musique, written in collaboration with Toussaint Bertin de la Doué, 1706)
- Saül, ou L'ombre de Samuel (intermèdes for a spoken tragedy by an anonymous author, 1706)
- L'école de Mars (divertissement, published 1738)
- Diane et l'Amour (idylle héroïque, published 1751)
- Le triomphe de l'Hymen et de l'Amour (divertissement)

=== Other vocal works ===
- Usque quo (oratorio)
- L'amour champêtre (cantata)
- Airs sérieux avec accompagnement de violon, flûte et basse
- Cantata “Le temple de Bacchus” (1745)

=== Instrumental works ===
- Sonatas for violin and bass (1723)

== Sources ==
- Le magazine de l'opéra baroque by Jean-Claude Brenac (in French)
