= Ebro Treaty =

226 BC treaty between Carthage and the Roman Republic

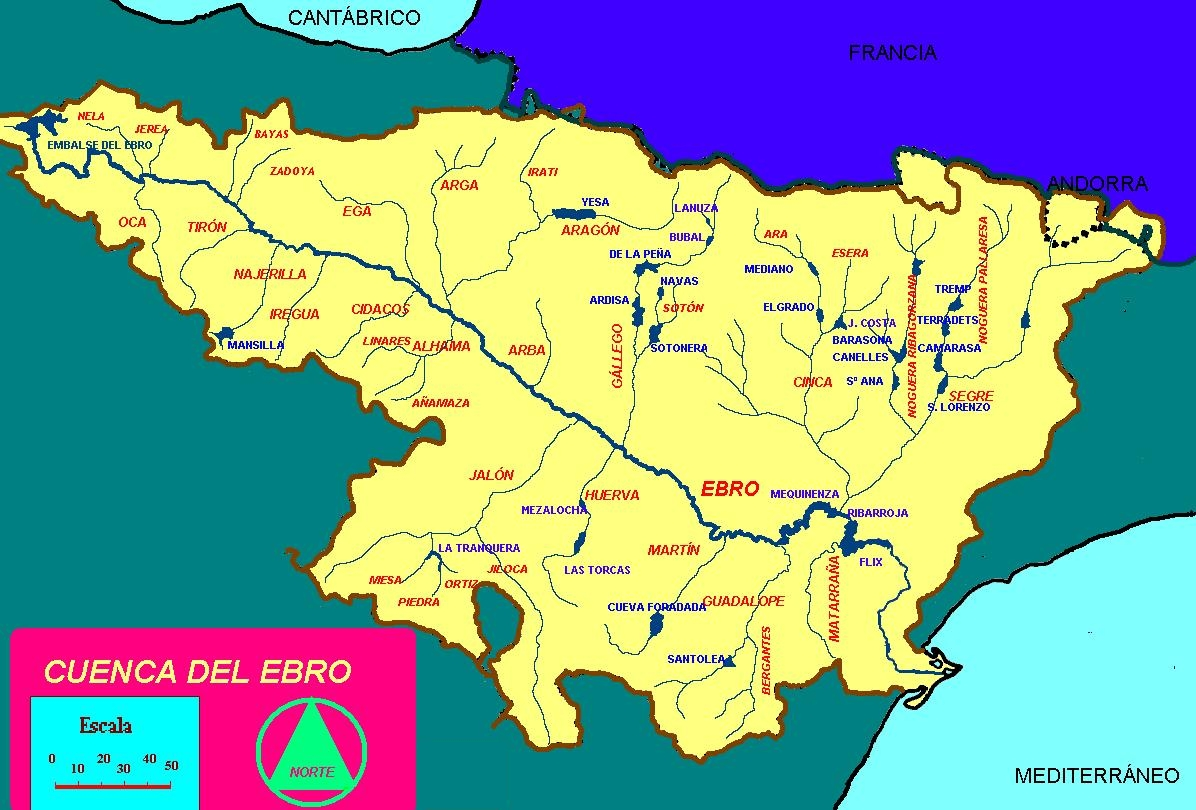
The Ebro River, in Spain

The Ebro Treaty was a treaty signed in 226 BC by Hasdrubal the Fair of Carthage and the Roman Republic, which fixed the river Ebro in Iberia as the boundary between the two respective powers. Under the terms of the treaty, Carthage would not expand north of the Ebro, as long as Rome likewise did not expand to the south of the river.

At an unknown date some time after 226 BC, Rome became affiliated with the town of Saguntum, located south of the Ebro River. Polybius states that the Carthaginian general Hannibal had been looking for a pretext for war and that the Roman alliance with a town south of the river, contravening the treaty, provided the justification. After briefly consulting with the Carthaginian senate, Hannibal attacked Saguntum, resulting in an eight-month siege. The Roman senate immediately sent embassies to Hannibal and to the Carthaginian senate. Initially, the Roman embassies demanded that Carthage hand over Hannibal for attacking a Roman ally. The Carthaginians refused, stating that the Saguntines had begun the war.

Roman diplomatic missions, 219–218 BC

The Romans were unable to come to the aid of Saguntum before the town fell in 219 BC. After Saguntum fell, the Romans made preparations for war and sent a second embassy to Carthage. The Roman envoys demanded that Carthage hand over Hannibal and any others responsible for the attack on Saguntum. Livy states that this second embassy was sent simply to follow the formalities of officially declaring war; meaning that the Romans fully anticipated a renewed war with Carthage. Both Livy and Polybius provide accounts of the argument between the second Roman embassy and the Carthaginian senate.

The Carthaginian senate then disavowed the Ebro treaty and again refused to hand Hannibal to the Romans. The Carthaginians are said to have compared this treaty to the one made between Catulus and Hamilcar Barca in 241 BC. Here the Carthaginians argued that the Roman people themselves refused to accept the treaty made by the two generals because it had not been ratified by the people. The Roman envoys did not accept this argument, and war was declared in 218 BC, leading to the Second Punic War, which would last until 201 BC.

== See also ==
- The Treaty with Saguntum, T. A. Dorey, http://www.uc.pt/fluc/eclassicos/publicacoes/ficheiros/humanitas11-12/01_Torey.pdf
- List of treaties
- Casus belli
