= Mazaetullus =

Mazaetullus ⵎⵙⴷⵍ
- Numidian prince Effective Regent

Ruler of the Massylli
- Reign: 206 BC–205 BC
- Predecessor: Capussa
- Successor: Masinissa
- Born: 3rd century BC; Eastern Numidia
- Spouse: Hannibal's niece
- House: Massylii
- Dynasty: Massyllian
- Father: Naravas
- Military career
- Conflicts: Massylian civil war; Second Punic War; Battle of Zama

Mazaetullus (Numidian: ⵎⵙⴷⵍ, MSDL; Ancient Greek: Μεσότολος), also known as Meztul or Metzul, was a Numidian prince and a de facto ruler of the Massylii in Eastern Numidia during the reign of Lacumazes. He rose to prominence in the late 3rd century BCE amid a period of succession struggles, inciting the Massylian civil war in 206 BCE, and organized a revolt against the ruling family, successfully usurping the throne from Capussa. Mazaetullus also engaged in the Second Punic War as an ally of Carthage, and was the brother-in-law of Hannibal.

== Lineage and family ==
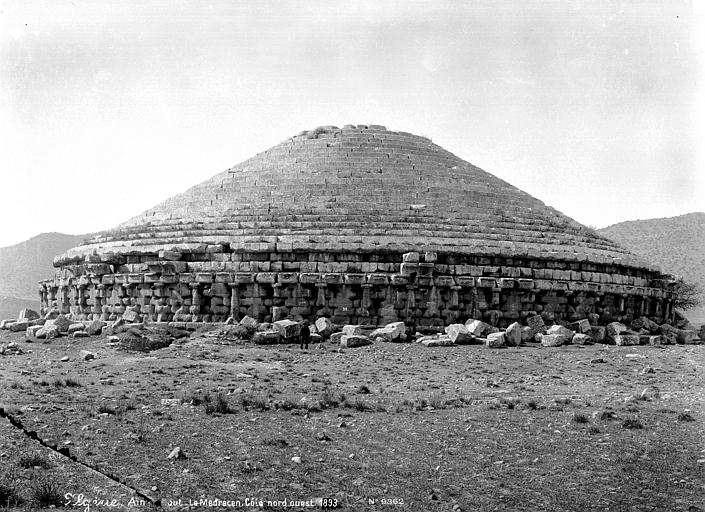
The Medracen royal mausoleum, attributed to the early ancestors of the Massyllian dynasty.

Mazaetullus descended from the Massylian Numidian royal lineage. Livy records that he belonged to a family traditionally hostile to the reigning house, engaged in a perpetual struggle against the incumbents of the throne. He belonged to the same lineage as all the other royal princes, and their ancestry can be deduced from the bilingual inscription found in Dougga, which lists the names of the Numidian princes. According to this inscription, Mazaetullus was a descendant of Naravas, and through him, he was related to Ailymas, one of the ancestors of the Massylians. Thus, he was the son of Naravas, the grandson of Zilalsan II, and the cousin of Masinissa, Capussa, and Lacumazes.

He married a Carthaginian noblewoman, the niece of Hannibal and granddaughter of Hamilcar, who belonged to the first category of the aristocracy, described by Livy as (Carthaginiensis nobilis femina). In fact, she was the widow of his uncle, the late king Oezalces. Mazaetullus wed her to secure Carthaginian support, providing further evidence of the enduring alliance between the Barcid family and the Numidian royal house.

It is probable that Hannibal himself favored the coup led by Mazaetullus against the dominant faction. Certain regal qualities may have influenced her, as Livy notes that her husband refused the title of "Rex." Livy rarely honors a foreign woman with the title femina; he reserves this designation only for women of the highest nobility, those for whom he seeks to evoke sympathy, or those who have earned the title through patriotic deeds.

== Massylian civil war ==
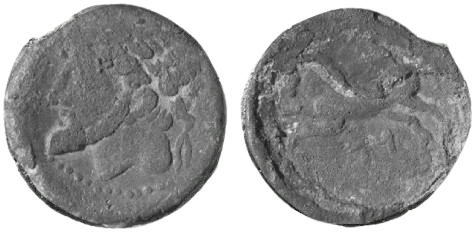
A coin attributed to Capussa, the king of the Massylii.

The struggle for the Massylian throne began following the death of King Gaia around 206 BCE. He was succeeded by his younger brother, Oezalces, who passed away after a very brief reign. His eldest son, Capussa, took the throne but lacked popular support. The spark of civil war was ignited by the emergence of Mazaetullus, who incited a rebellion to overthrow his cousin. Leading an armed insurgency with a loyal army, Mazaetullus engaged in several battles against the ruling faction, ultimately resulting in the death of Capussa.

While the Massylians acknowledged his authority, Mazaetullus refused the title of King. Instead of crowning himself, he assumed the role of regent and installed Capussa's younger brother, Lacumazes, as the figurehead monarch. Mazaetullus enjoyed significant backing from Syphax, King of the Masaesyli, and it is highly probable that the Carthaginians supported him as well; indeed, it was Hannibal himself who reportedly encouraged the insurrection.

Upon hearing of his father's death and the political upheaval within the kingdom, Masinissa departed from Hispania, heading for Numidia to confront Mazaetullus and reclaim the throne.

== Second Punic War ==
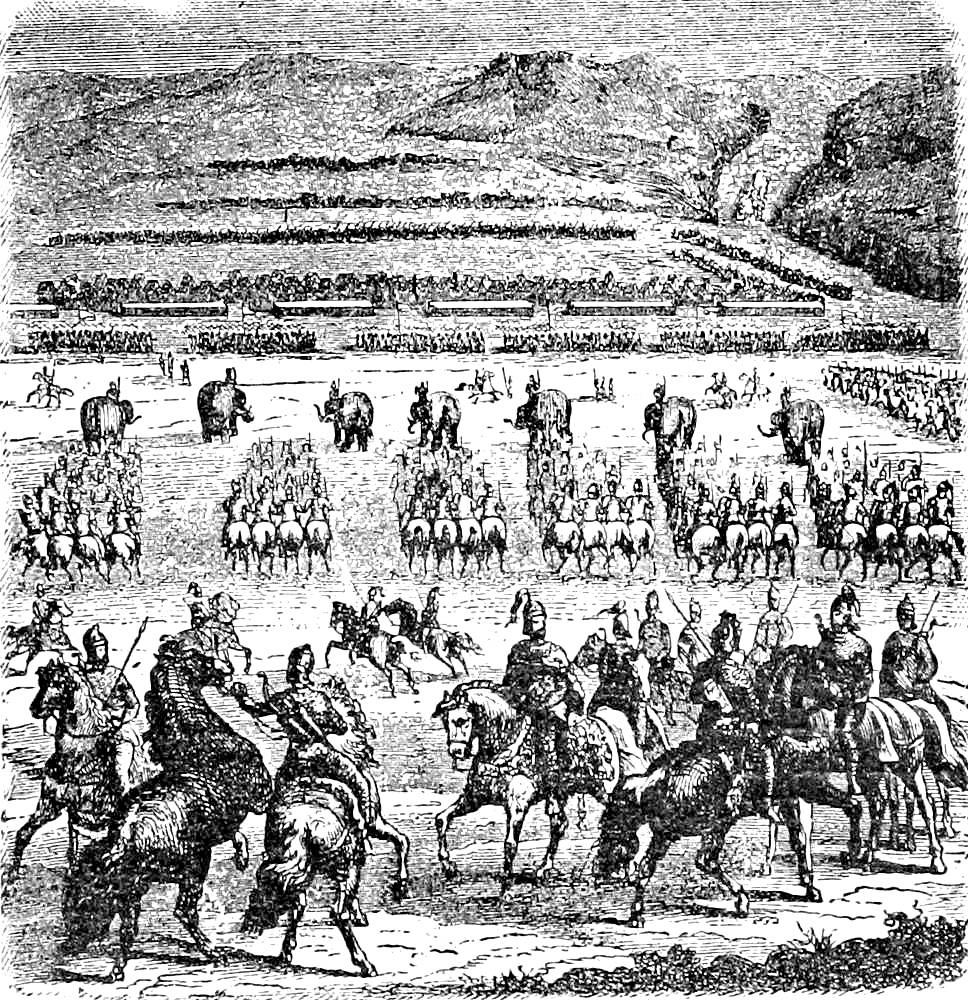
Cavalry formation and maneuvers during the Battle of Zama (202 BCE), where Mazaetullus commanded a contingent of 1,000 Numidian horsemen.

In the wake of the ongoing conflict in North Africa following the shift of the theater of war, Mazaetullus engaged in the Second Punic War, driven by his alliance with Carthage as a brother-in-law to the Barcid family and an ally of Syphax. Driven by a deep-seated animosity toward Masinissa, whom he regarded as a usurper of the throne, he viewed the Second Punic War as the ultimate opportunity to topple him and reclaim his rule.

Appian confirms that he joined the struggle and reached an agreement with Hannibal starting from Hadrumetum. His presence with the Carthaginians continued until the Battle of Zama, where he served as one of the commanders of the Numidian cavalry corps within the allied Numidian army. He participated with 1,000 horsemen alongside another Numidian prince named Tycheaus, whom Hannibal had summoned, entreating him for assistance to save the situation.

It is probable that the number of Numidian warriors fighting effectively for each side at Zama was approximately equal. This serves as an indicator of the fragility of Masinissa's control over Numidia during that critical period.

== See also ==
- Massylii
- Second Punic War
- Battle of Zama
- Lacumazes
- Capussa
- Numidia
- Barcids
- Naravas
