= List of kings of Numidia =

King of Numidia
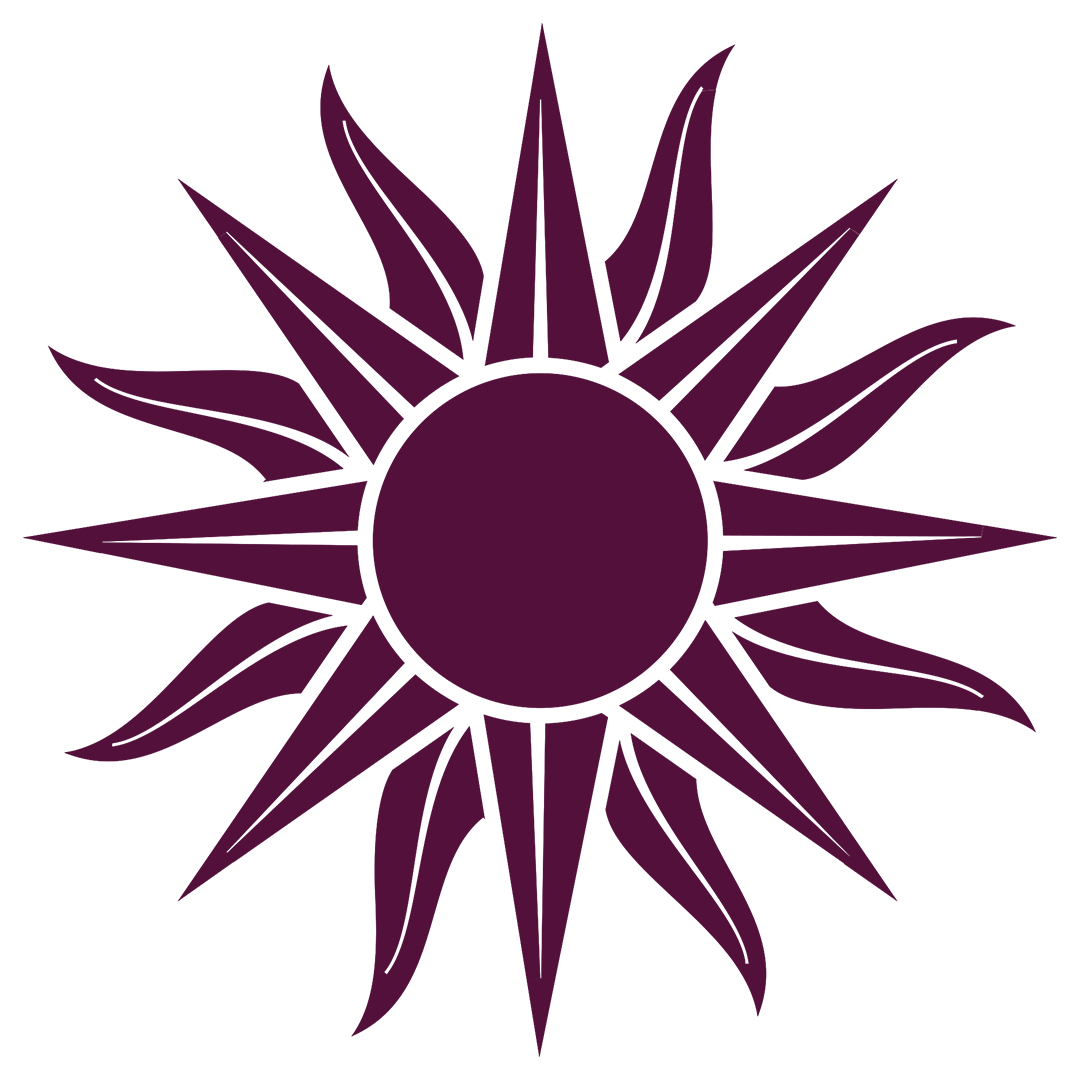
- The Numidian sun, as presented on some coinage of Masinissa and Micipsa.

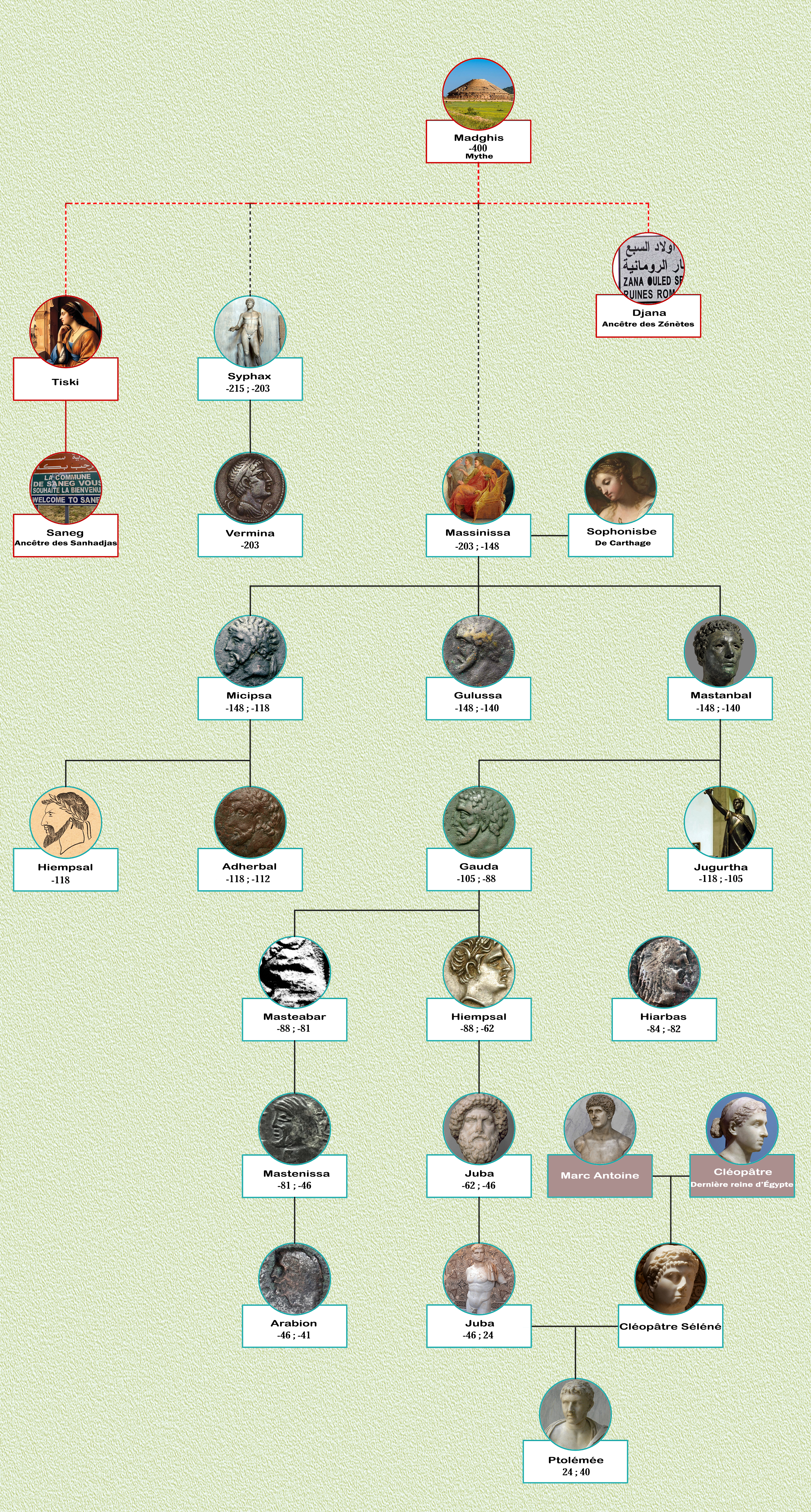
- Tree of the Numidian royal dynasty.

Details
- Style: King of the Numidians, Agellid
- First monarch: Madghis
- Last monarch: Juba II
- Formed: c. 400BC
- Abolished: 25 BC
- Residences: Cirta, Siga, and Iol

Numidia was an ancient Berber kingdom located in the region of North Africa that today comprises Algeria and parts of Tunisia, Libya and Morocco. The kingdom existed from the 3rd to the 1st century BC. Numidia was originally composed of two large kingdoms: the Massyles in the east and the Masaesyles in the west, but it was unified into a single kingdom by Masinissa, the king of Massylii. Rome established it as a client kingdom after the Second Punic War and annexed it, first in 46 BC and again in 25 BC after a brief period of restored independence under King Juba II (30 BC–25 BC).

After this, the kingdom was annexed to the kingdom of Mauretania, being ruled by Juba II as a client king. The royal line ended in 40 AD after Juba II's son Ptolemy was murdered by his cousin Caligula. The kingdom itself ended after the demise of Ptolemy's former slave Aedemon, who had revolted from 40 AD to 42 AD against Rome. After this, the kingdom was completely annexed by the Roman Empire.

Before Massinissa's unification there were two distinct groups:

- The Massylii or Maesulians were a Berber confederation in eastern Numidia (central and eastern Algeria), which was formed by an amalgamation of smaller tribes during the 4th century BC. They were ruled by a king. On their loosely defined western frontier were the powerful Masaesyli. To their east lay the territory of the rich and powerful Carthaginian Republic. Their relationship to Carthage resembled that of a protectorate. Carthage maintained its dominance over the Massylii by skilful diplomatic manoeuvering, playing off local tribal and kingdom rivalries. The principal towns of the Massylii were Cirta, Tébessa and Thugga in modern-day Algeria and Tunisia.
- The Massaesylii were a Berber confederate kingdom of western Numidia (central and western Algeria) and the main antagonists of the Massylii in eastern Numidia. The kingdom of Massaesylia extended all the way west to the Mulucha river and under Syphax its authority extended to the Strait of Gibraltar.

== Progenitors ==
=== Semi-legendary or legendary ===
A few Berber and Greek mythological figures have been associated as being ancient kings of Numidia. Their existence is more controversial than the semi-legendary ones hence why they are placed in this category.

Name	Reign	Succession	Life details
Antaeus	Unknown	Ancient giant king of Libya	Beaten and killed by Heracles in a fight. Said to be buried at the Msoura Dolmen.
Diodorus	Unknown	Son of Antaeus's son in law Sufax, is said to have become king after him.	Nothing known except that many Numidian kings claim to descend from him and Sufax.
Iarbas (I)	9th century BC	King of Gaetulia who tried to marry queen Dido.	He is sometimes placed at the origin of the genealogy of the kings of the Kingdom of Numidia.

== Massylian and Masaesylian dynasty (c. 400–202 BC) ==
=== Semi-legendary ===
Some Numidian kings are only known though legends: while they could have existed, most of the details about their lives have been either exaggerated or completely invented. Among those kings there is Madghis who is believed to be an ancestor of the Numidians. There is also the mythical founder of the dynasty, Iles, whose life is surrounded by mystery and whose existence is heavily debatable: some historians do not even consider him as a king who existed.

Name	Reign	Succession	Life details
Madghis	Unknown	Founded the kingdom?	King of Numidia after whom the mausoleum of Medghacen was named. Not related to the other Numidian kings.
Zelalsan	Unknown	Possibly the son of Madghis.	Believed to have been a shophet; nothing else known.
Iles	Unknown	Not related to the two before. Took the throne after his predecessor's death.	Believed to have unified his kingdom and founded the Massyliian dynasty.

=== Kings of the Massylii (Eastern Numidia) ===
The last ruler of the Massylii conquered the Masaesyli and created the unified Numidian kingdom.

Portrait	Name	Reign	Succession	Life details (Lifespan unknown unless stated)
–	Aylimas	c. 344 – c. 310 BC (34 years)	Son of Iles	Allied with Agathocles of Syracuse then betrayed him, resulting in his own death after a siege. He was succeeded by his brother Niptasan.
–	Niptasan	c. 310 – c. 274 BC (36 years)	Brother of Aylimas	Nothing much known, inherited the kingdom after his brother's demise.
	Zelalsan II	c. 274 – c. 250/260 BC (24/34 years)	Brother of Niptasan	First king for which there is reliable historical information; vassal for Carthage.
	Gaia	260 – 207 BC (53 years)	Son of Zelalsan II	Intensified his kingdom's relation with its neighbors, first true king.
–	Oezalces	207 – 206 BC (a year)	Brother of Gaia	His reign was defined by internal turbulence and instability, after reigning for a year, he wasoverthrown and killed by his own son, Capussa, which created a civil war.
	Capussa	206 BC (few months)	Son of Oezalces, took power after overthrowing him.	He reigned very briefly and was defeated and killed in a coup d'état by Mazaetullus. He proclaimed as a King, Lacumazes, the youngest son of Oezalces, then set himself as a regent.
–	Lacumazes	206 BC (few months)	Brother of Capussa, took power after his brother's murder by Mazaetullus.	Reigned as the puppet of Mazaetullus, who held all of the true power. Overthrown by Massinissa and forced to flee with his regent. Came back to the court years later and pardoned by Massinissa.
–	Mazaetullus	206 BC (few months; disputed)	Son of Naravas. Killed his predecessor Capussa in a coup and ruled as de facto ruler.	Overthrown by Massinissa, had to take refuge in Syphax's court. Fate unknown.
bust	Massinissa	206 – 202 BC (4 years)	Son of Gaia, overthrew both Lacumazes and Mazaetullus.	238 – 148 BC. Reigned for a few years, then defeated Syphax and founded the unified kingdom of Numidia. Fought as an ally for Rome.

=== Kings of the Masaesyli (Western Numidia) ===
Name	Reign	Succession	Life details
Aylimas	c.340 – 310 BC (34 years)	Believed to be the son and successor of Iles, conquered the kingdom of the Masaesyli.	Allied with Agathocles of Syracuse then betrayed him, resulting in his own death after a siege. He was succeeded by his brother Niptasan.
Naravas	Unknown (disputed)	Son of Zelalsan II, believed to have reigned as king.	He played a pivotal role in the Mercenary War (241–238 BC), initially joining the Libyan rebels before later aligning with Carthage, an alliance that significantly shifted the balance of power during the conflict.
Syphax	c. 225 – c. 203 BC (22 years)	Predecessor uncertain	Lifespan 250 – 202 BC. He ruled over a territory extending from present day Constantine to Moulouya. The territory from the Moulouya to the Strait of Gibraltar and Tingis was also under the authority of Syphax. He was defeated by Massinissa and captured by the Romans. Died in captivity in 202 BC.
Vermina	c. 203 – c. ? BCE (uncertain)	Son of Syphax	After arriving late at the Battle of Zama, he was defeated and forced to sue for peace by the Romans after escaping. Huge portions of his territories were annexed after this. While Vermina escaped this battle, he was forced to sue for peace with the Romans in 200 BC.
Archobarzane	c. ? – c. 175 BCE (uncertain)	Son of Vermina	In contrast to his father, who sought peace with the Romans after the Second Punic War, Archobarzane seems to have been in favor of Carthage. His kingdom was therefore annexed by Massinissa around 157 BC with the blessing of Rome, and his fate after this remains unknown.

== Unified Numidia ==
The three sons of Massinissa originally shared the kingdom, dividing responsibility. Micipsa later tried the same thing with his three heirs, but the result was a civil war. The Roman Republic defeated Numidia during the Jugurthine War. Gauda thus succeeded to a reduced Numidian kingdom. He divided the kingdom geographically between his two sons, establishing two different lines of Numidian kings. They were briefly displaced by a certain Hiarbas, but Roman intervention restored them.

Name	Reign	Succession	Life details
Masinissa	202 – 148 BCE (50 years)	First king of unified Numidia after Syphax's defeat, made his kingdom a huge regional power in North Africa.	c. 238 BC – 148 BC (aged 90) Died of old age.
Micipsa	148 – 118 BCE (30 years)	Inherited the throne with his two brother but outlived them by almost 30 years and reigned alone from then.	c. 198 – 118 (aged 80) Probably died of old age.
Gulussa	148 – 145 BCE (3 years)	Chosen as successor with his two brothers, great general and tactician. Nothing else known.	Unknown lifespan Cause of death unknown.
Mastanabal	148 – 140 BCE (8 years)	Chosen as successor with his two brothers. Won a gold medal at the Athens Hippodrome in a horse-drawn chariot racing event.	Unknown lifespan No mention of him after 139BC, most likely died of illness.
Hiempsal I	c. 118 – c. 117 BCE (less than a year)	Son and successor of Micipsa with his brother Adherbal and his cousin Jugurtha.	? – c. 117 BCE (age unknown) Murdered with his supporters by Jugurtha's men.
Adherbal	c. 118 – c. 112 BCE (6 years)	Son and successor of Micipsa with his brother Hiempsal I and his cousin Jugurtha.	? – c. 112 BCE (age unknown) Besieged and murdered by Jugurtha despite being put under protection by the Romans.
Jugurtha	118 – 105 BCE (13 years)	Son of Mastanabal, overthrew and killed all of his rivals resulting in a war with Rome.	c. 160 – 104 BCE (aged 56) Defeated and captured by the Romans then thrown into the Tullianum prison, where he was executed by strangulation.
Massiva II	111 – 110 BCE (a year; disputed) (Note: After Adherbal's murder, Massiva, a son of Gulussa fled to Rome where he claimed the Numidian throne. It is unknown but highly possible that the Roman Senate hailed him as a rival king against Jugurtha)	Fled to Rome after his cousin's murder where he claimed the Numidian throne and probably was chosen as a rival king by the Roman Senate.	? – 110 BC (age unknown) Murdered by Jugurtha's men in Rome.
Gauda	105 – 88 BCE (17 years)	Brother of Jugurtha, placed as king by the romans after his brother's defeat. Last king of unified Numidia.	? – 88 BCE (age unknown) Died of unknown causes.

== Dynastic conflicts ==
=== Eastern Numidia ===
This was the main Numidian kingdom after 81.

- Hiempsal II (88–81), son of Gauda
- Oxyntas (c. 90 BC), son of Jugurtha and pretender
- Hiarbas (81–79), unknown lineage, usurper
- Hiempsal II (79–60), second reign
- Juba I (60–46), son of Hiempsal II
- Massintha (62 BC), ancestor of Jugurtha who served as a pretender against Hiempsal II. (existence debated)

Annexed to Rome as province Africa Nova (46–30).

- Juba II (30–25), son of Juba I

Annexed to Rome as province Africa Proconsularis (25 BCE – 193 CE).

=== Western Numidia ===
This was a much smaller chiefdom than Eastern Numidia

- Masteabar (88–81)
- Massinissa II (81–46)
- Sittius (46–44), a Roman mercenary leader
- Arabio (44–40)

Annexed to Rome as part of province Africa Nova (40–30).

- Juba II (30–25), son of Juba I

Annexed to the Kingdom of Mauretania (25 BCE – 40 CE).
