= Gaia (king) =

- Agellid
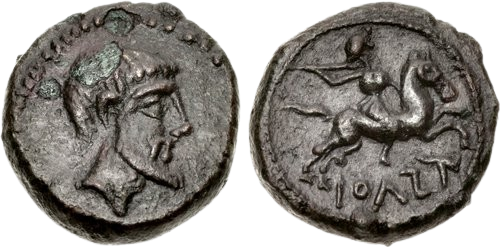
- Possibly a coin of the Numidian king Gaia

King of the Massylli
- Reign: 260–207 BC
- Predecessor: Zelalsan II
- Successor: Oezalces
- Born: 3rd century BC; Macomades, Eastern Numidia
- Died: 207 BC; Hippo Regius, Eastern Numidia
- Spouse: Berber Prophetess
- Issue: Masinissa; Massiva; Feriel
- Numidian: Gyy
- Dynasty: Massylii
- Father: Zelalsan II
- Religion: Libyan religion
- Military career
- Conflicts: Second Punic War

Gaia (Numidian: Gyy) was a Berber king of the Massylii, an eastern Numidian realm in North Africa. He was the father of King Masinissa, and the brother of Oezalces and Naravas. Greco-Roman authors give his name as "Gala", but an inscription in Dougga indicates it may have instead been "Gaia".

== Reign ==
Gaia inherited a pre-existing territory from his father Zelalsan, bordered to the East by Carthage and to the West by the kingdom of the Masaesyles, two major African powers of the time.

At the beginning of his reign around 240 BC, the First Punic War (264-241 BC) weakened Carthaginian power. Gaia took advantage of this to undertake the conquest of coastal cities controlled by Carthage. A skilled tactician with excellent cavalry, he defeated the Carthaginians and made Annaba (also known as Hippo Regius) his capital.

Being a king attentive to the geopolitical developments of his time, Gaia forged a new alliance with the Carthaginians in 213/212 BC in response to the rise to power of Syphax, his Masaesylian neighbor, who had recently entered into conflict with them. His foresight allowed him to seize the Punic cities along the Numidian coast. It was also from this period, and with the reversal of alliances, that the military career of his son Massinissa began, who would later write a new chapter in the history of the Berbers.

== Legacy ==
In Massylian custom, the king gives his name to the period during which he holds office.

At this point, it is worth noting that succession to the Massylian throne did not necessarily pass from father to son, but rather through the eldest son of the lineage. Thus, upon Gaia's death, it was not one of his sons, but the eldest of the Massylian chieftains—first his brother Oezalces and then his nephew Capussa—who were successively proclaimed kings. After Capussa's death in battle, Massinissa asserted his claim against the puppet-king Lacumazes.

During the Second Punic War (218-202 BC), Romans and Carthaginians vied for the alliance of the Numidians, due to the valor of their leaders and the often decisive role of their cavalry and their extremely resilient Barb horses.

== Sources ==
- Livy, XXIV, 48, 13
- Appian, Lib. 10
- In his book "History of North African Thought", Hassan Banhakeia (1966-) explains that Gaia was the first to appropriate the title of "Aguellid", which still means "king" in Berber.
- * "Gaia", Gabriel Camps (1927–2002), Berber encyclopedia, 19 | 1998, document G05, published online on June 1, 2011.

== See also ==
- List of Kings of Numidia
