= Oezalces =

- Agellid

King of the Massylli
- Reign: 207–206 BC (a few months)
- Predecessor: Gaia
- Successor: Capussa
- Born: 3th century BC; Eastern Numidia.
- Died: 206 BC; Eastern Numidia, possibly Cirta.
- Spouse: Hannibal's niece
- Issue: Capussa; Lacumazes
- Numidian: ⵡⵍⵣⴰⵙⵉⵙ
- House: Massylii
- Dynasty: Massyllian
- Father: Zelalsan II

Oezalces or Wezalsen was a king of the Massylii realm of Eastern Numidia, ascending the throne as the successor to his brother Gaia, for a brief period around 206 BCE.

This reign was defined by internal turbulence and instability, which eventually precipitated a civil war. he was the brother-in-law of the Carthaginian general Hannibal.

== Biography ==
Oezalces is considered one of the Numidian kings whose reigns were remarkably brief, lasting only a few months. His tenure was characterized by instability, primarily due to his advanced age; Livy described him as being 'Very aged man' (admodum senex). He ascended to the throne in 206 BCE, the same year Gaia passed away. Livy further confirms that according to Numidian custom, succession followed a collateral system passing from brother to brother before reverting to the eldest son of the deceased monarch. Consequently, upon Gaia's death, the crown passed to Oezalces, to whom Masinissa was initially loyal.

Barnaby Rogerson notes that Oezalces maintained an alliance with Syphax the king of the Masaesyli, a relationship that caused significant apprehension among Roman commanders during the Second Punic War, therefore Gaius Laelius was fully cognizant of the potential political repercussions of the daring incursion he was leading across the mountains of Numidia.

== Family and Lineage ==
Oezalces descended from the Massylian Numidian royal lineage; he was the son of King Zilalsan II and the younger brother of Gaia, alongside Naravas. He enjoyed the highest honors and esteem within his brother's court. He was the father of Capussa and Lacumazes. Furthermore, Oezalces married a noblewoman, who was a young niece of the general Hannibal and the granddaughter of Hamilcar. Perhaps she was also the daughter of Salammbo, the wife of Naravas. Dexter Hoyos suggests the possibility of her being the sister of Hanno, son of Bomilcar. This union continued the tradition of forging strategic ties between the Barcid family and the Numidian royal dynasty. As the head of the Barcid family, it was Hannibal who sanctioned this marriage; indeed, it is highly probable that he initiated it to ensure the continuity of the Massylian alliance despite the recent Punic setbacks.

== See also ==
- Capussa
- Lacumazes
- Gaia
- Massylii
