= Capussa =

- Agellid of the Massylii
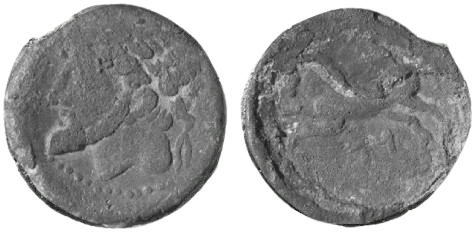
- Rare coin of Capussa found in the wreck of an ancient ship (Note: Regarding the coins bearing the legend "K(...)N", existing literary sources leave no alternative but to attribute them to Capussa, a cousin of Massinissa who briefly preceded him on the throne following the death of Gaia (206 BC). J. Mazard, however, ruled out this possibility without offering any supporting arguments. This lack of argumentation led G. Camps to re-propose the attribution to Capussa, thereby depriving Massinissa of the distinction of having inaugurated Massylian coinage.)

King of the Massylli
- Reign: 206 BC
- Predecessor: Oezalces
- Successor: Lacumazes
- Died: 206 BC; Kingdom of the Massylli
- Numidian: K(...)N
- Dynasty: Massylii
- Father: Oezalces
- Mother: Hannibal's niece (Note: Believed to be Lacumazes's mother, likely also his)
- Religion: Libyan religion

Capussa was a king of the ancient Numidian tribe Massylii in 206 BC. He was the son of Oezalces who had succeeded his brother, Gala, on the Massylian throne.

== Biography ==
Oezalces had normally inherited the power since he was the oldest prince. When he died, a few months after his arrival, his eldest son, Capussa, was proclaimed king without Masinissa, son of Gala, attempting to assert his rights since in the order of succession, he was just after his cousin Capussa.

The reign of Capussa was short-lived. A hostile party was formed by Mazaetullus, a Numidian chief related to the royal lineage but having no rights to the throne. Mazaetullus had married the widow of Oezalces, a Carthaginian, which earned him the support of at least a part of the Punic aristocracy concerned perhaps from this time to remove Masinissa from power, although he has until then faithfully served the interests of Carthage fighting under Hasdrubal's orders in Spain.

Capussa was defeated and killed in a coup d'état by Mazaetullus. He proclaimed as a King, Lacumazes, the youngest son of Oezalces, then set himself as a regent.
