= Gulussa =

King of Numidia

- Coin with the two-letter legend GN, attributed to Gulussa (or Gauda) by J. Mazard

King of Numidia
- Reign: 148–c. 145 BC
- Predecessor: Masinissa
- Successor: Micipsa; Mastanabal
- Co-ruler: Micipsa; Mastanabal
- Died: 145 BC (?) (Note: No mention of him past this date making his death likely)
- Issue: Massiva II
- House: Massylii
- Father: Masinissa
- Military career
- Conflicts: Numidian-Carthaginian War; Battle of Oroscopa; Third Punic War; Siege of Carthage; Battle of Lake Tunis

Gulussa (Numidian: GLSN) was the second legitimate son of Masinissa. Gulussa became the King of Numidia along with his two brothers around 148 BC and reigned as part of a triumvirate for about three years.

== Biography ==
=== Succession ===
In 148 BC, Masinissa, feeling that he was near death, consulted with Scipio Aemilianus regarding the settlement of his state.

Resuscitating, perhaps, a Libyan custom which shared the authority between three persons, Scipio Aemilianus established the three legitimate surviving sons as kings: Micipsa, Gulussa and Mastanabal. (Note: Mastanabal was actually called Mastana'b', as for Micipsa the spelling of his name was, in Libyco-Berber as in Punic, Mkwsn; Gulussa is the only one whose name is preserved by the Greek and Latin authors in its exact form: Glsn.) The royal power was divided among the three princes. Micipsa, the eldest, was in charge of the administration; it was to him that Masinissa had given his ring which, judging from the stelae of the Abizar style, was a sign of power. Gulussa was given the command of the armies. As for Mastanabal, who was said to have been instructed in Greek, he was charged with justice, and relations with vassal tribal leaders.

=== Diplomacy ===
He took part in several anti-Carthaginian legations to Rome. During one of them, he tried to persuade the Senate to reject the Carthaginians accusing Masinissa of occupying the territories belonging to Carthage. Arround 171 BC he warned the Romans that the Carthaginians were expanding their fleet and in 151 BC he informed about Carthage's preparations for war. Appian also writes about an embassy to Carthage, on which he set out with his brother Micipsa to demand the recall from exile of politicians friendly to Numidia. The Carthaginians did not receive the envoys, and attacked them on their way back

=== War with Carthaginians ===
Gulussa already had a solid experience of war. He had the opportunity to prove his worth by fighting the Carthaginians. In the spring of 150 BC, he and Micipsa led an embassy to the Carthaginian authorities. But the Carthaginians, exasperated by the successive annexations of Masinissa, refused to enter into negotiations and even ambushed the princes on their return from Carthage. This action by the Carthaginians gave the Numidians the excuse to resume the fighting and they seized the Carthaginian city of Oroscopa. The fighting then served as a pretext for Rome to intervene in the region. Gulussa and his troops participated in the Battle of Carthage (148 BC).

=== Later life ===
After the settlement of 148 BC, there is no further information on Gulussa or Mastanabal. Nothing is known about the dates of their deaths and the end of the triumviral reign. It can be deduced from the dedication of the temple of Massinissa in Dougga that by 139 BC Micipsa reigned alone over Numidia. (Note: The archaeological documents relating to Gulussa are very rare: the stela n° 63 of El Hofra (Cirta) is the only one to mention the three kings. Other documents, the rare coins (Mazart, n ° 37, 38, 39) which bear a biliteral Punic legend GN which according to the system of identification of the Numidian kingdoms can be ascribed to Gulussa as to his nephew Gauda.)

Polybius praises Gulussa's "true Numidian simplicity". Gulussa had a son named Massiva, who later visited Rome and was assassinated under the orders of his cousin Jugurtha, the adoptive son and successor of Micipsa.

== Bibliography ==
=== Sources ===
- Camps, Gabriel (1999) [published online 2011]. "Gulussa". Encyclopédie berbère. Vol. 21 | Gland – Hadjarien. Aix-en-Provence: Edisud. pp. 3243–3245.
- Berthier A. et Charlier Abbé R., Le sanctuaire punique d’El Hofra à Constantine. Paris, A.M.G., 1955.
- Camps G., Aux origines de la Berbérie, Massinissa ou les débuts de l’Histoire. Alger, Libyca, Archéol., Epigr, 1960.
- Decret E et Fantar Mh., L’Afrique du Nord dans l’Antiquité, des origines au V siècle. Paris, Payot, 1980.
- Gsell S., Histoire ancienne de l’Afrique du Nord, t. III, p. 369, t. V, p. 141, 158, 162, t. VII, p. 138.
- Picard G.-CH., Civitas Maktaritana, Karthago, VIII, 1957.
- Saumagne C, La Numidie et Rome, Massinissa et Jugurtha, Publ. univ. Tunis, 1966.

Preceded by Masinissa	King of Numidia (With Micipsa and Mastanabal 148–145 BC)	Succeeded by Hiempsal I, Adherbal and Jugurtha
