= Micipsa =

- Agellid of the Massylii; Prince who devices good Sovereign of broad lands
- Bronze coin depicting either Masinissa or Micipsa, minted in Cirta (Note: All of the tridrachms previously atrributed to him date from a century before his reign and are of Hispano-Carthaginian origin. Those were recently reattributed as Hispano-Carthaginian Shekels minted around 237-227 BC)

King of Numidia
- Reign: 148–118 BC
- Predecessor: Massinissa
- Successor: Hiempsal I Adherbal; Jugurtha
- Co-rulers: Gulussa (148–145 BC); Mastanabal (148–140 BC)
- Born: 198 BC; Cirta, Kingdom of Numidia
- Died: 118 BC (aged about 80); Cirta, Kingdom of Numidia
- Issue: Hiempsal I; Adherbal; Jugurtha (by adoption)
- Numidian: MKWSN
- Punic: 𐤌𐤊𐤅𐤎𐤍 (MKWSN)
- Dynasty: Massylii
- Father: Masinissa

Micipsa (Numidian: MKWSN; Punic: 𐤌𐤊𐤅𐤎𐤍, MKWSN; died c. 118 BC) was the eldest legitimate son of Masinissa, the King of Numidia, a Berber kingdom in North Africa. Micipsa became the King of Numidia in 148 BC.

== Early life ==
In 151 BC, Masinissa sent Micipsa and his brother Gulussa to Carthage to demand that exiled pro-Numidian politicians be allowed to return, but they were refused entry at the city gates. As the royal party turned to depart, Hamilcar the Samnite and a group of his supporters attacked Micipsa's convoy, killing some of his attendants. This incident led to a retaliatory strike on the Carthaginian town of Oroscopa that heralded the start of the Carthaginian–Numidian War and eventually precipitated the Third Punic War.

== Succession to the throne ==
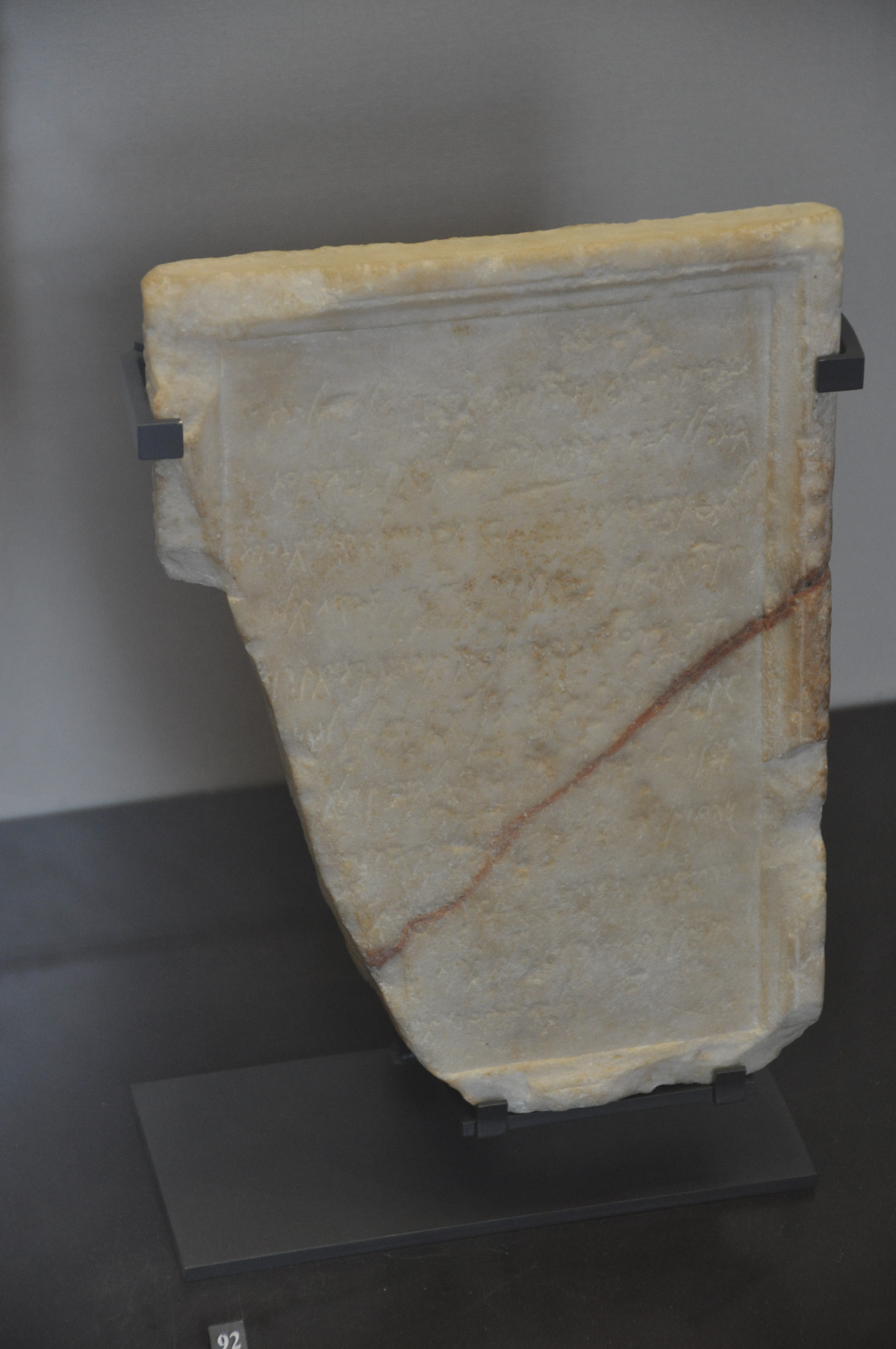
The Neopunic Micipsa inscription dedicated to "Mikiwsan (= Micipsa), king of the Massyli"

In the spring of 148 BC Masinissa died and the tripartite division of the kingdom among the elderly king's three sons, Micipsa, Gulussa, and Mastanabal, took place by Publius Cornelius Scipio Aemilianus, to whom Masinissa had given the authority to administer his estate. Micipsa received as part of his inheritance the Numidian capital of Cirta (along with its royal palace and treasury), Gulussa the charge of war and Mastanabal the administration of justice.

The sons continued their father's policy and his support of Rome during its war on Carthage. Though Micipsa wavered somewhat in his support for Rome, "always promising arms and money ... but always delaying and waiting to see what would happen". In 146 BC, when Mastanabal's illegitimate son Jugurtha was fourteen years old, Carthage was destroyed by the Romans. Shortly afterwards Galussa died and later still Mastanabal, leaving Micipsa control of the entire kingdom. During Micipsa's reign Numidian cultural and commercial progress was aided when thousands of Carthaginians fled to Numidia following the Roman destruction of Carthage. He was the first to establish Iol (now Cherchell, Algeria) as the capital for the Numidian court.

Micipsa had two natural sons, Hiempsal and Adherbal, and is reported to have added his illegitimate nephew Jugurtha to his palace household. Jugurtha was treated as the king's son and received a sound military training. Micipsa continued to be a loyal ally to Rome, providing military assistance when asked. In 142 BC the Roman commander Quintus Fabius Maximus Servilianus wrote to Micipsa asking for a division of war elephants to help in Rome's struggle against the Lusitanian rebel Viriathus. In 134 BC Micipsa sent archers, slingers and elephants to aid Scipio Aemilianus besieging Numantia in Spain, sending Jugurtha to command the Numidian units.

After the fall of Numantia, Jugurtha returned home with a letter from Scipio addressed to his uncle. In it, the commander praised Jugurtha's exploits and congratulated Micipsa for having "a kinsman worthy of yourself, and of his grandfather Masinissa". On this recommendation the king formally adopted Jugurtha and made him co-heir with his own children.

== Death ==
In 118 BC, Micipsa died and, following the king's wish, Numidia was divided into three parts which were ruled by Adherbal, Hiempsal and Jugurtha.

== Notes ==
Preceded by Masinissa	King of Numidia; 148 - 118 BC (With Gulassa and Mastanabal 148 - 145 BC)	Succeeded by Hiempsal I, Adherbal and Jugurtha
