= Misagenes =

Numidian general and son of Massinissa, possibly a co-ruler

- Numidian general, possibly a co-ruler

Numidian prince
- Reign: active between 171-167 BC
- Died: before 148 BC
- Father: Massinissa
- Military career
- Allegiance: Numidia
- Conflicts: Third Macedonian War

Misagenes (in Latin: Misagenes) was a Numidian chief and general, son of Masinissa.

He possibly was associated to the throne by his father.

== Third Macedonian War ==
His father appointed him commander of the forces that helped the Romans fight against King Perseus in the Third Macedonian War in 171 BC. He appears to have held this position and remained in Greece for nearly four years. It is said that during the war he rendered important services to Rome, earning their respect. After the war, he returned to Africa (perhaps in 167 BC) sent by Aemilius Paullus of Macedon, but the ships carrying his troops were scattered in a storm, and many sank. Misagenes survived and had to take refuge in the port of Brundusium where he was received with distinction by the quaestor Luci Estertini to whom he had sent the Roman Senate, who provided him with everything he needed for his troops and showered him with gifts.

== Later life ==
He undoubtedly died before his father, as he is not mentioned again after the death of Massinissa.
