= Naravas =

3rd Century BCE Numidian chief, fought in the Mercenary War

Naravas ⵏⵔⴱⵙ
- Numidian prince Possibly a king
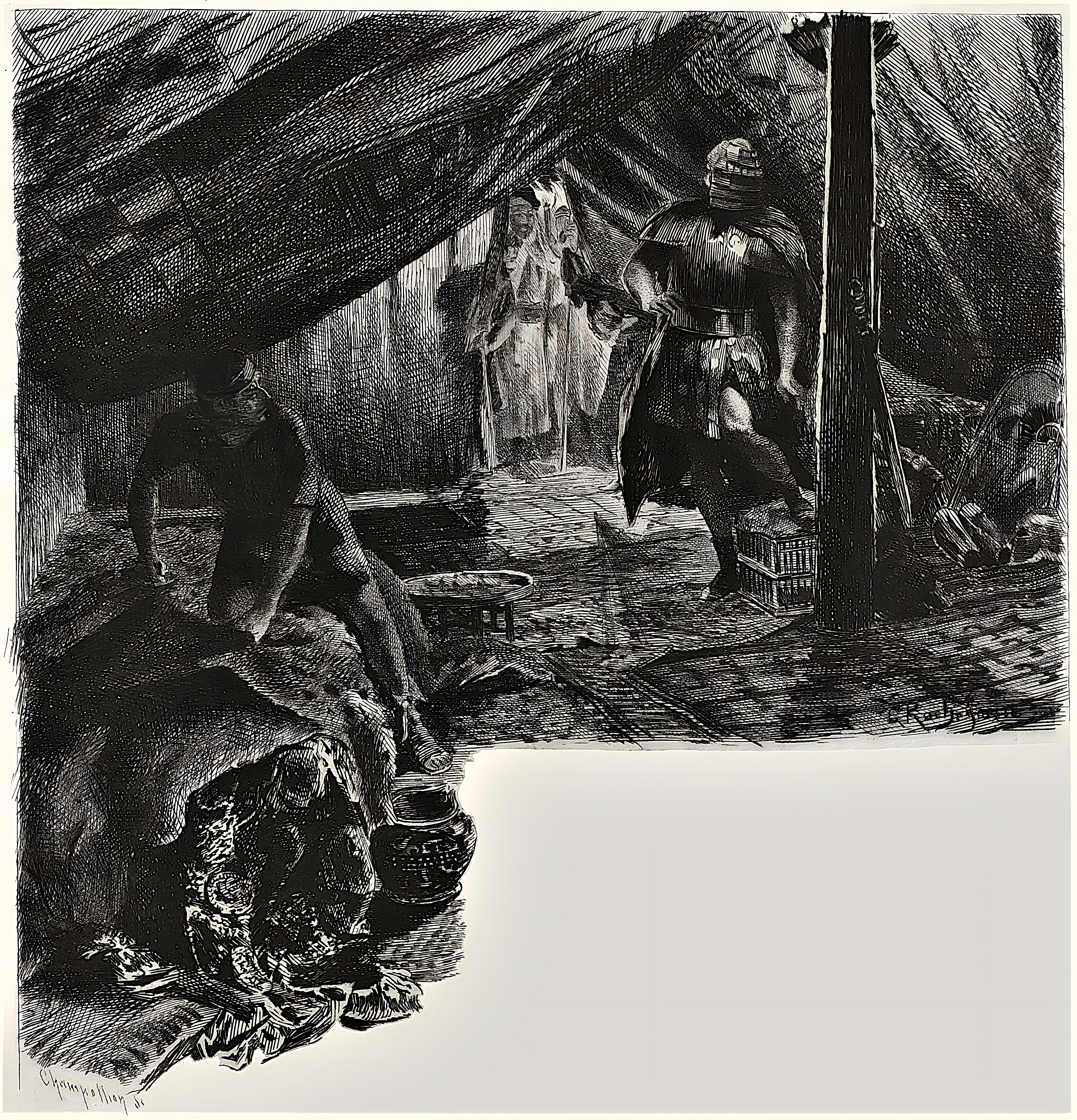
- Entrance of Naravas into Mâtho's Tent, as envisaged by Georges Rochegrosse and Eugène-André Champollion.

King of the Masaesyli (Note: Uncertain)
- Reign: unknown
- Predecessor: Last recorded previous ruler Aylimas
- Successor: perhaps Syphax
- Born: 3rd century BC; Eastern Numidia
- Spousse: Salammbo (3rd daughter of Hamilcar)
- House: Massylii
- Dynasty: Massyllian
- Father: Zelalsan II
- Military career
- Conflicts: Mercenary war; Battle of Utica; Hamilcar's defeat of Spendius and Autaritus; Battle of the Bagradas River (240 BC); Siege of tunis

Naravas (Numidian: ⵏⵔⴱⵙ, Nrbs(h); Punic: 𐤍𐤓𐤅𐤈, nrwt) was a Numidian prince of the 3rd century BCE, occasionally referred to as a king, descending from the Massylian royal dynasty of Eastern Numidia. He played a pivotal role in the Mercenary War (241–238 BCE), initially joining the Libyan rebels before later aligning with Carthage, an alliance that significantly shifted the balance of power during the conflict. Naravas was the son of Zelalsan II, the uncle of the Numidian King Masinissa, and the son-in-law of the Carthaginian general Hamilcar.

== Alliance with Hamilcar Barca ==
During the Mercenary War, Naravas had joined the army of Spendius. During a critical time, he switched his allegiance to Hamilcar Barca of Carthage.

In 239 BC, he arrived at Hamilcar's camp with 2,000 horsemen. This probably saved the Carthaginian army from destruction. His troops pushed back the mercenaries of Mathos, the Libyan chief, at the Battle of Bagradas River. After the battle, he took possession of the town of Utica.

== Family ==
Naravas married one of Hamilcar Barca's daughters, who was also a sister of Hannibal. Her true name is unknown, but Gustave Flaubert gave her the name Salammbo in his novel of that name.
