= Madghis (king) =

- Agellid
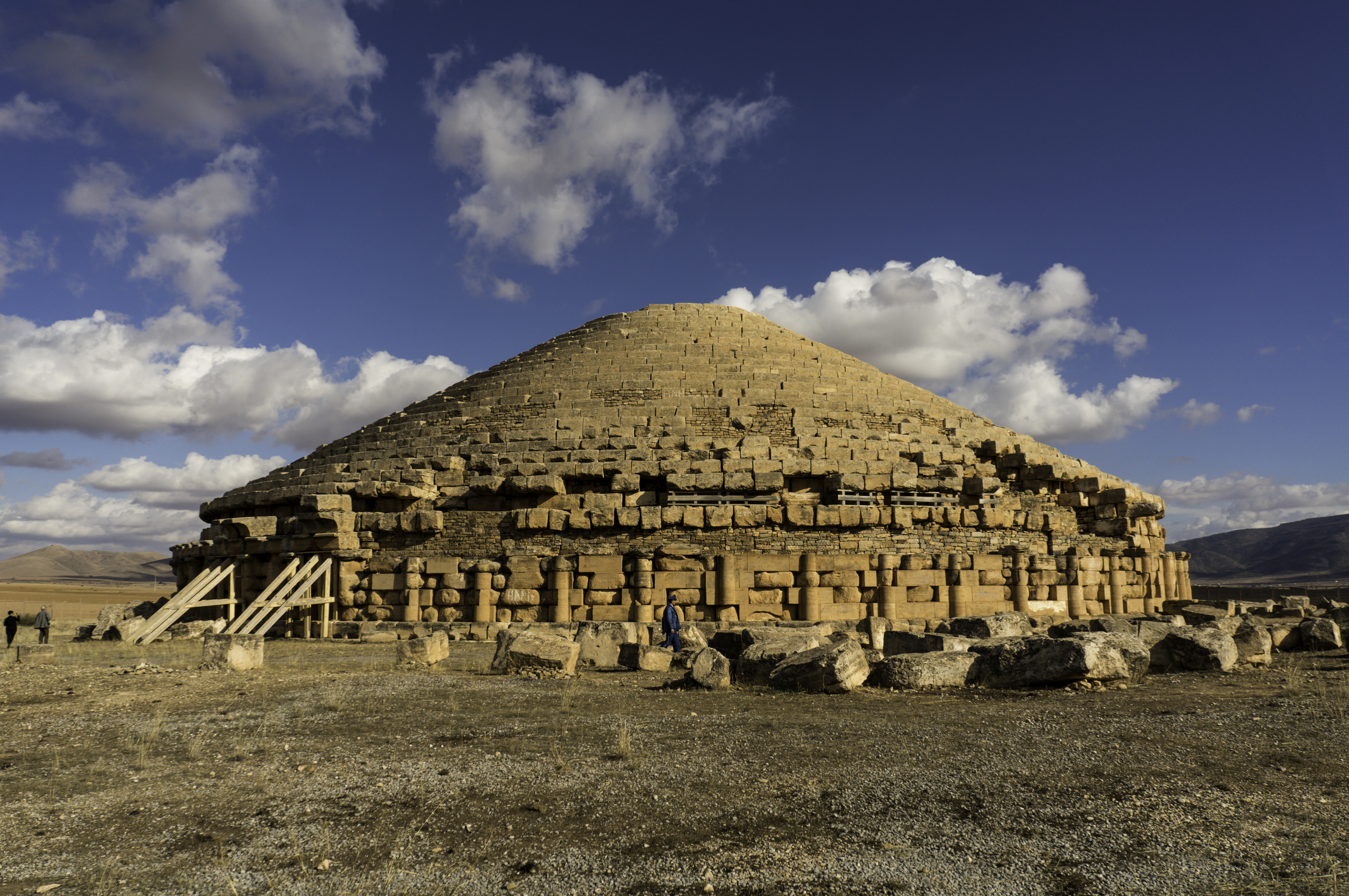
- The Medracen.

King of Numidia
- Reign: 4th century BC
- Predecessor: Diodorus (indirectly)
- Successor: Zilalsan (?)
- Born: 4th century BC
- Burial: Medracen
- Spouse: Amlel
- Issue: Zilalsan ? Zeddjik
- Father: Berr
- Religion: Libyan religion

Madghis or Madghes (Berber languages: Madɣis, Madɣes, ⵎⴰⴷⵖⵉⵙ), is the first recorded semi-legendary king of Numidia, during the 4th century BC.

He was according to Ibn Khaldun an ancestor of the Numidians.

== Biography ==
Numidia was located in North Africa and participated in the second Punic War, changing alliances, going from the Carthaginians to Rome. According to the myth, Madghis unified the territory and created his kingdom.

According to Gabriel Camps the existence of a kingdom or kingdoms undoubtedly dates back to a very early period, yet the earliest Numidian kings who might have ruled over vast territories remain unknown to classical Greco-Roman sources. One such ruler emerged in the early 3rd century or perhaps even the late 4th century BC, commissioning the construction of the Medracen (Madghis).

He was powerful enough to have this colossal monument built, demonstrating a remarkable ability to mobilize a large workforce for an elaborate project that was deeply Libyan in character (a gigantic bazina) yet incorporated specific Mediterranean (Greco-Punic) architectural references in its peripheral engaged colonnade.

Genaology of Madghis according to Ibn Khaldun

== Legacy ==
According to Ibn Khaldun, Madghis was the ancestor of the Numidians and the Berbers of the Botr branch, Zenata, Banou Ifren, Maghraouas (Aimgharen), Marinids, Zianids and Wattassids.

He is also said to be the ancestor of the Sanhaja (Zirids), Hammadids, and Almoravids, as well as other Berber tribes such as the Ketama and Kutama, etc.
