= Zelalsan II =

- Shophet (𐤔𐤐𐤈)
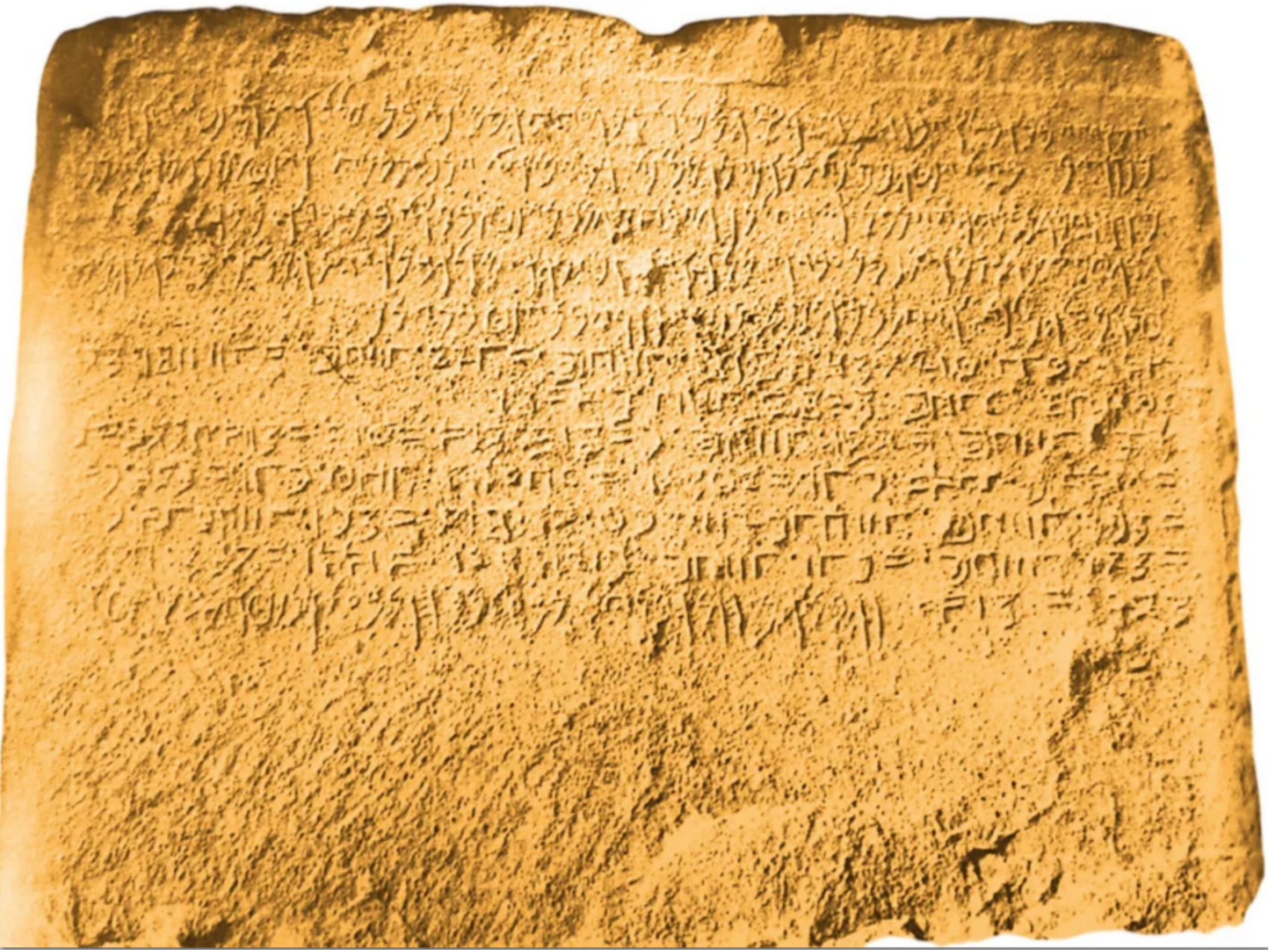
- The bilingual Libyan stele of Dougga mentions him, it is written: Masnsen a-gəllidṯ u-Gayya a-gəllidṯ u-Zelalsen šufeṭ... In English: "Masinissa, king, son of Gaia the king, son of Zilalsan the judge (suffete)"

King of the Massyli
- Reign: 274–250 BC
- Predecessor: Niptasan
- Successor: Gaia
- Born: c. 300 BC
- Died: c. 250 BC
- Issue: Gaia; Naravas; Oezalces
- Dynasty: Massyli
- Father: Iles
- Religion: Libyan religion

Zelalsan II or Zilalsan (Numidian: ZLLSN), born around 290 BC, was a Berber king of the Massylian dynasty.

Although there were a number of rulers before him, Zelalsan II is the first king of Numidia for which there is any reliable historical information. He reigned in the 3rd century BC and is most likely an ancestor of the Numidian king Massinissa, who later unified the kingdom of Numidia at the end of the 3rd century BC.

He is considered one of the greatest kings in North African history, having worked to unify the Numidian kingdom and its royal family.

Zelalsan was a member of the Massylian dynasty and the son of a Berber chieftain named Iles as well as the father of King Gaia but also Naravas and Oezalces. As Numidian succession was done through brothers first instead of sons, Zelalsan inherited the kingdom on his brother Niptasan's death in c. 274 BC.

== See also ==
=== Bibliography ===
- Gabriel Camps, Encyclopédie berbère
