= Lacumazes =

King of the Massylli
- Reign: 206 BC
- Predecessor: Capussa
- Successor: Masinissa
- Regent: Mazaetullus
- Died: after 206 BC
- Dynasty: Massylii
- Father: Oezalces
- Mother: Hannibal's niece (Note: Hence why Mazaetullus also married her)
- Religion: Libyan religion

Lacumazes was a king of the ancient Numidian tribe Massylii in 206 BCE.

== Biography ==
Lacumazes was the youngest son of Oezalces, his elder brother being Capussa. Whilst still very young, he was placed upon the throne of the Massylii by Numidian chieftain, Mazaetullus, who deposed and executed Capussa. As soon as Masinissa returned to Africa, Lacumazes fled and took refuge in the court of Syphax to ask for help; but before reaching the destination, he was attacked by Massinissa, and narrowly escaped capture. From Syphax he obtained auxiliary troops, with whom he joined his guardian, Mazaetullus, and faced Massinissa, but both armies were defeated. Lacumazes and Mazaetullus escaped and took refuge in the court of Syphax. Massinissa encouraged him to return and he was received at the Massylii court with all the honors due to his royal blood.
