= Niptasan =

Semi-legendary figure of the ancient Numidia

King of the Massylli
- Reign: 310–274 BC
- Predecessor: Aylimas
- Successor: Zelalsan II
- Died: 274 BC; Numidia
- Dynasty: Massyli
- Father: Iles
- Religion: Libyan religion

Niptasan (in berber: ⵏⵉⴱⵜⴰⵙⴰⵏ (Nibtasan)) is a semi-legendary figure of the ancient Numidia, mentioned as the son of Iles and a member of the Massylii dynasty.

He would be placed in genealogical lists as the successor of his brother Aylimas and predecessor of Zelalsan II as in Numidian tradition, the brothers come before the sons in succession. The dates of his reign are sometimes placed between 310 (death of Aylimas) and 270 BC, but these remain hypothetical, due to a lack of direct sources.

This era preceded the greater involvement of Numidian rulers in Mediterranean affairs, particularly during the conflicts between Carthage and Rome that culminated in the Second Punic War (218–201 BCE).

Informations about Niptasan comes primarily from oral tradition studies, rather than from contemporary documents or period writings. Historians emphasize that historical documentation for this period of Numidia is extremely limited or completely inexistant, and that figures like Niptasan should be considered semi-legendary or even entirely fictional.

It would seem that after his death, he was succeeded by his brother Zelalsan II.
