= Masinissa =

First King of Numidia from 202 BC to 148 BC

- Friend of the Romans; Agellid of the Massylii and Masaesyli; The best and happiest monarch of our time (Note: According to Polybius)
- Roman marble bust of Masinissa, Capitoline Museum

King of Numidia
- Reign: 202 BC–148 BC
- Predecessor: New establishment
- Successor: Micipsa; Gulussa; Mastanabal

King of the Massylii
- Reign: 206 BC–202 BC
- Predecessor: Lacumazes
- Successor: Himself as King of Numidia
- Born: c. 238 BC; Mascula (Khenchela)
- Died: 148 BC (aged about 90)
- Burial: Royal tomb of El Khroub
- Spouse: Queen Sophonisba of Numidia
- Issue: Micipsa; Gulussa; Mastanabal; Misagenes; Masgava; Stembanos; Other 40 childrens
- Tribe: Massylii
- Father: Gaia
- Military career
- Conflicts: Second Punic War; Campaign against Syphax (212 BC); Battle of Castulo; Battle of Ilorca; Battle of Ilipa; Battle of the Great Plains; Battle of Bagbrades; Battle of Utica (203 BC); Battle of Cirta; Battle of Zama; Numidian-Carthaginian War; Battle of Oroscopa

Masinissa (Numidian: MSNSN) (c. 238 BC – 148 BC), also spelled Massinissa, Massena and Massan, was an ancient Numidian king best known for leading a federation of Massylii Berber tribes during the Second Punic War (218–201 BC), ultimately uniting them into a kingdom that became a major regional power in North Africa, in what is largely present-day Algeria. Much of what is known about Masinissa comes from Livy's History of Rome, and to a lesser extent Cicero's Scipio's Dream. As the son of a Numidian chieftain allied to Carthage, he fought against the Romans in the Second Punic War, but later switched sides upon concluding that Rome would prevail. With the support of his erstwhile enemy, he united the eastern and western Numidian tribes and founded the Kingdom of Numidia. As a Roman ally, Masinissa took part in the decisive Battle of Zama in 202 BC that effectively ended the war in Carthage's defeat; he also allowed his wife Sophonisba, a famed Carthaginian noblewoman who had influenced Numidian affairs to Carthage's benefit, to poison herself in lieu of being paraded in a triumph in Rome.

After inheriting a larger, more powerful kingdom now backed by Rome, Masinissa played a decisive role in provoking Carthage into triggering the Third Punic War, which ended in the city's complete destruction, and left Numidia the sole power in northwest Africa. He ruled for 54 years until his death at age 90. He was regarded as a staunch ally of Rome, and an unusually vigorous ruler, leading troops until his death and fathering some 44 sons. His tomb in Cirta (modern-day Constantine in Algeria) bears the inscription MSNSN, read Mas'n'sen, or "Their Lord".

The Greek historian Polybius, who wrote extensively about the Punic Wars and is reputed to have met Masinissa, described him as "the best man of all the kings of our time", writing that "his greatest and most divine achievement was this: Numidia had been before his time universally unproductive, and was looked upon as incapable of producing any cultivated fruits. He was the first and only man who showed that it could produce cultivated fruits just as well as any other country". In the following centuries, Numidia would become known as the breadbasket of Rome.

In addition to his legacy as a major figure in the Punic Wars, Masinissa is largely viewed as an icon by the Berbers, many of whom consider him their forefather.

== Early life ==
Masinissa was the son of the chieftain Gaia of a Numidian tribal group, the Massylii. He was brought up in Carthage, an ally of his father. At the start of the Second Punic War, Masinissa fought for Carthage against Syphax, the king of the Masaesyli of western Numidia (present day Algeria), who had allied himself with the Romans. Masinissa, then about 17 years old, led an army of Numidian troops and Carthaginian auxiliaries against Syphax's army and won a decisive victory (215–212 BC). He was betrothed to the daughter of the Carthaginian general Hasdrubal Gisco.

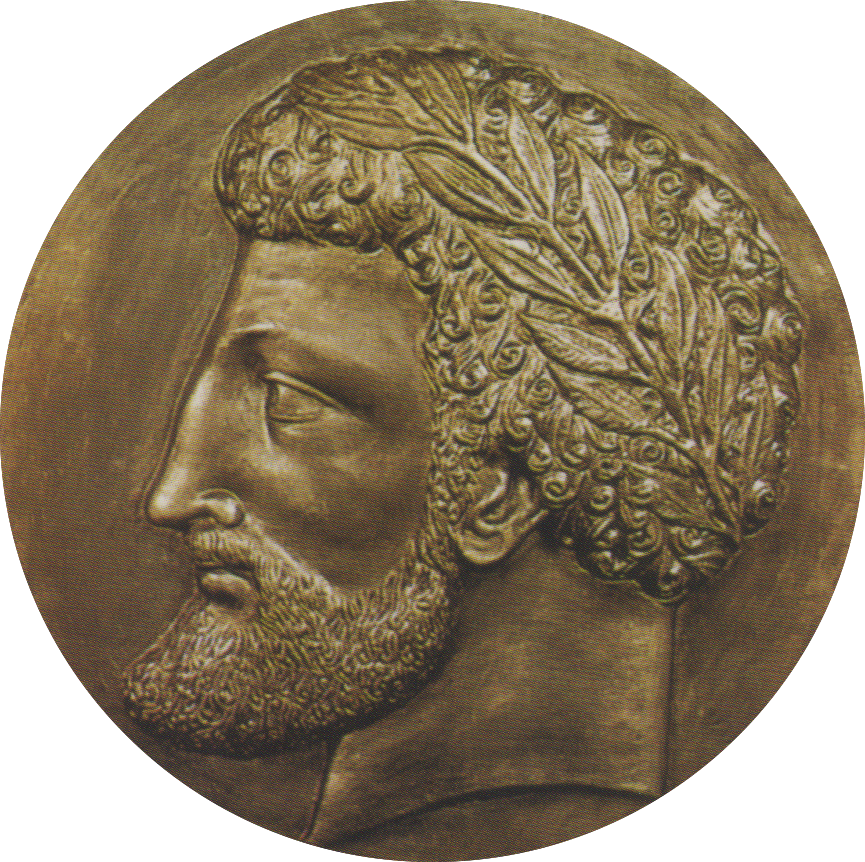
Massinissa of Numidia

After his victory over Syphax, Masinissa commanded his skilled Numidian cavalry against the Romans in Spain, where he was involved in the Carthaginian victories of Castulo and Ilorca in 211 BC. After Hasdrubal Barca departed for Italy, Masinissa was placed in command of all the Carthaginian cavalry in Spain, where he fought a successful guerrilla campaign against the Roman general Publius Cornelius Scipio (Scipio Africanus) throughout 208 and 207, while Mago Barca and Hasdrubal Gisco levied and trained new forces. In c.206 BC, with fresh reinforcements, Mago and Hasdrubal Gisco—supported by Masinissa's Numidian cavalry—met Scipio at the Battle of Ilipa, where Carthage's power over Hispania was forever broken in arguably Scipio Africanus's most brilliant victory.

When Gaia died in 206 BC, his son Masinissa and his brother Oezalces quarreled about the inheritance, and Syphax was able to conquer considerable parts of eastern Numidia. Meanwhile, with the Carthaginians having been driven from Hispania, Masinissa concluded that Rome was winning the war against Carthage and therefore decided to defect to Rome. He promised to assist Scipio in the invasion of Carthaginian territory in Africa. This decision was aided by the move by Scipio Africanus to free Masinissa's nephew, Massiva, whom the Romans had captured when he had disobeyed his uncle and ridden into battle. Having lost the alliance with Masinissa, Hasdrubal started to look for another ally, which he found in Syphax, who married Sophonisba, Hasdrubal's daughter, who until the defection had been betrothed to Masinissa. The Romans supported Masinissa's claim to the Numidian throne against Syphax, who was nevertheless successful in driving Masinissa from power until Scipio invaded Africa in 204. Masinissa joined the Roman forces and participated in the victorious Battle of the Great Plains (203).

At the Battle of Bagbrades (203), Scipio overcame Hasdrubal and Syphax and, while the Roman general concentrated on Carthage, Gaius Laelius and Masinissa followed Syphax to Cirta, where he was captured and handed over to Scipio. After the defeat of Syphax, Masinissa married Syphax's wife Sophonisba, but Scipio, suspicious of her loyalty, demanded that she be taken to Rome and appear in the triumphal parade. To save her from such humiliation, Masinissa sent her poison, with which she killed herself. Masinissa was now accepted as a loyal ally of Rome, and was confirmed by Scipio as the king of the Massylii. Following the capture of Syphax, the King Bokkar, ruler of what is now Morocco with his capital based in Tingis, had become a vassal of Masinissa.

At the Battle of Zama, Masinissa commanded the cavalry (6,000 Numidian and 3,000 Roman) on Scipio's right wing, Scipio delayed the engagement long enough to allow for Masinissa to join him. With the battle hanging in the balance, Masinissa's cavalry, having driven the fleeing Carthaginian horsemen away, returned and immediately fell onto the rear of the Carthaginian lines. This decided the battle and at once Hannibal's army began to collapse. The Second Punic War was over and for his services Masinissa received the Kingdom of Syphax, and became King of Numidia.

Masinissa was now king of both the Massylii and the Masaesyli. He showed unconditional loyalty to Rome, and his position in Africa was strengthened by a clause in the peace treaty of 201 between Rome and Carthage prohibiting the latter from going to war even in self-defense without Roman permission. This enabled Masinissa to encroach on the remaining Carthaginian territory as long as he judged that Rome wished to see Carthage further weakened.

== Later life ==
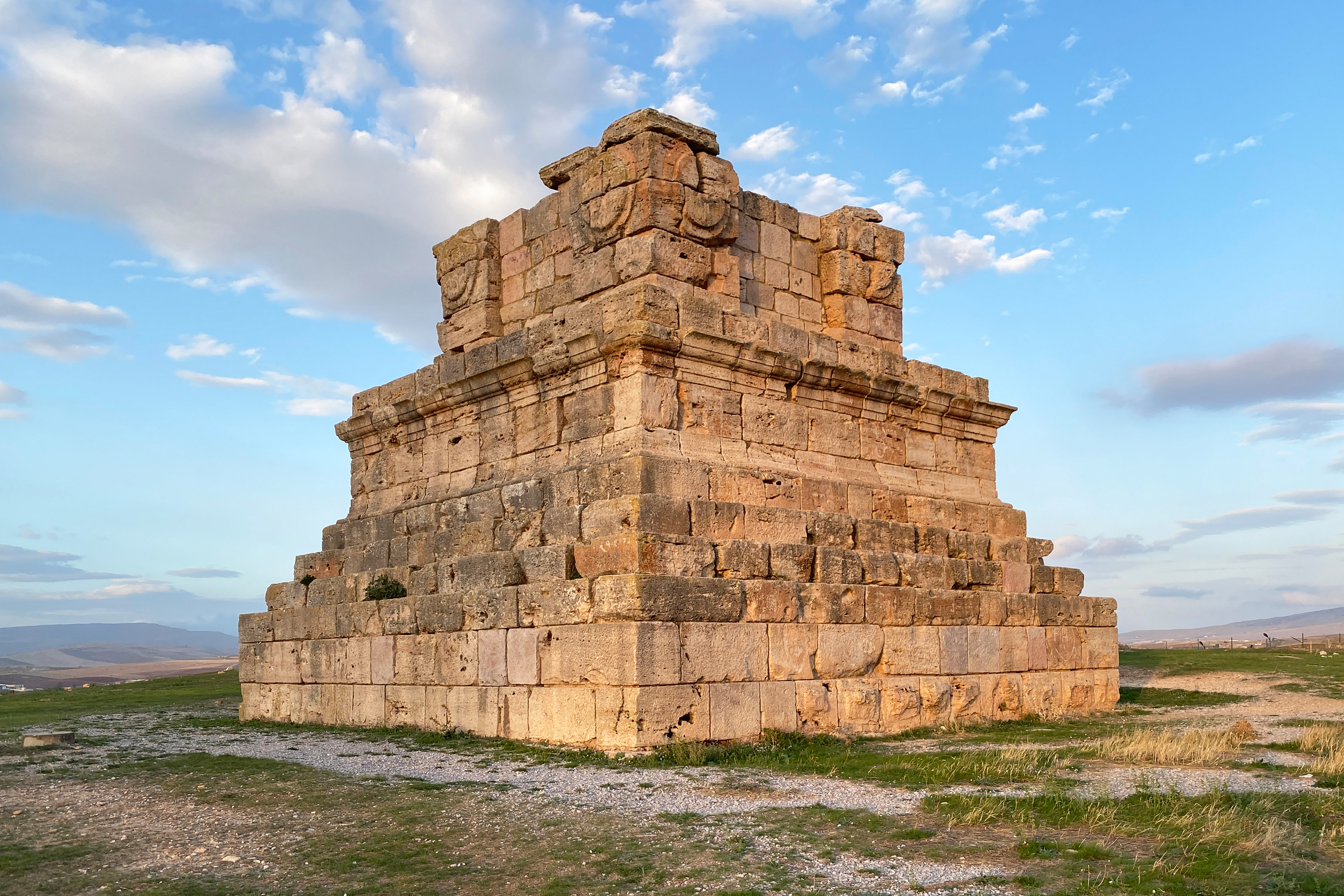
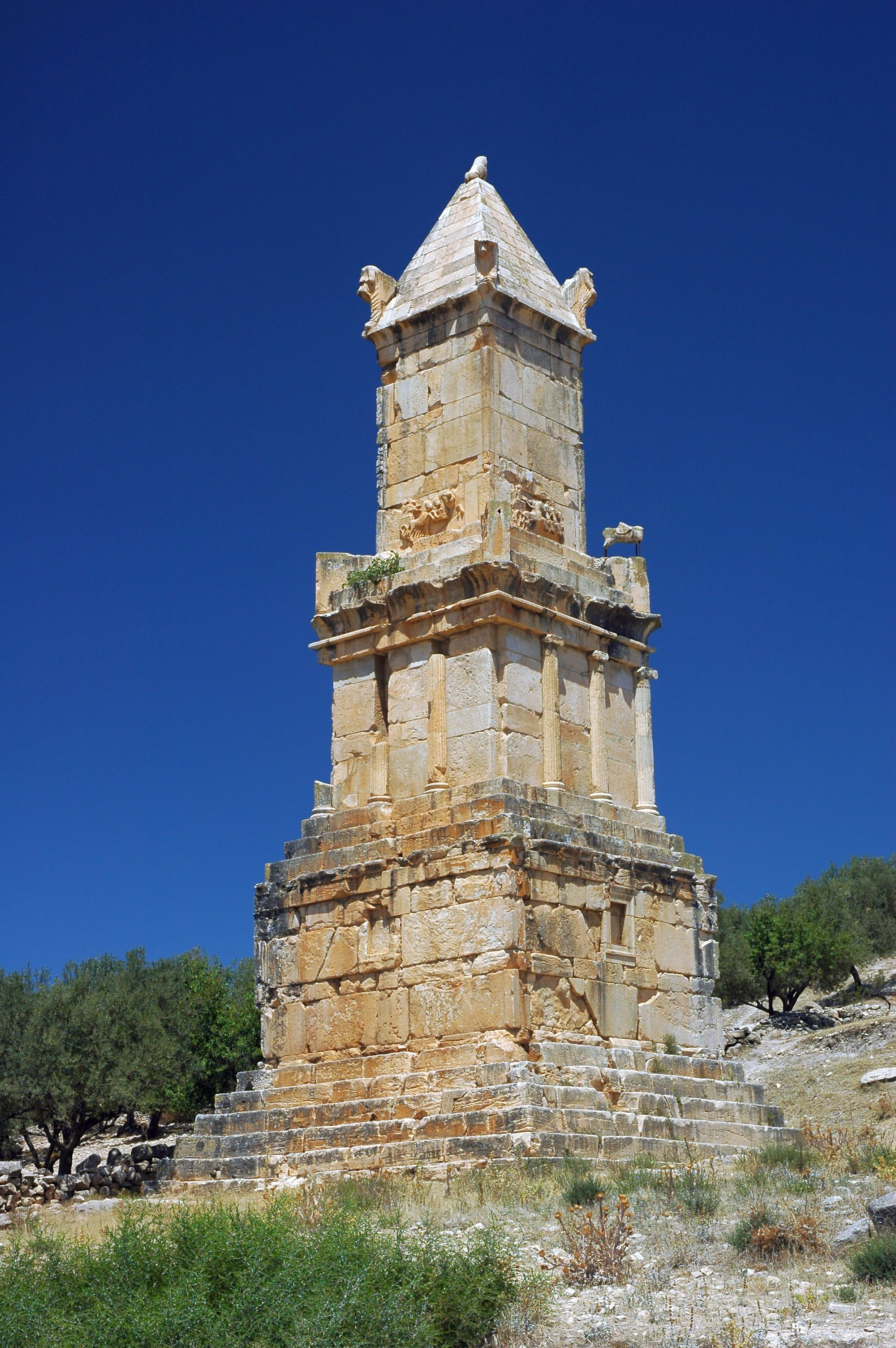
The tomb of Masinissa above (in El Khroub, Algeria), and the completely restored Libyco-Punic Mausoleum of Dougga (near Téboursouk, Tunisia), which may be a cenotaph for him, below.

With Roman backing, Masinissa established his own kingdom of Numidia, west of Carthage, with Cirta — present day Constantine — as its capital city. All this happened in accordance with Roman interest, as they wanted to give Carthage more problems with its neighbours. Masinissa's chief aim was to build a strong and unified state from the semi-nomadic Numidian tribes. To that end, he introduced Carthaginian agricultural techniques and forced many Numidians to settle as peasant farmers. Masinissa and his sons possessed large estates throughout Numidia, to the extent that Roman authors attributed to him the sedentarization of the Numidians. Major towns included Capsa, Thugga (modern Dougga), Bulla Regia and Hippo Regius.

All through his reign, Masinissa extended his territory, and he was cooperating with Rome when, towards the end of his life, he provoked Carthage to go to war against him. The Punic city answered in kind, even though it could not legally declare war due to its treaty with Rome. In one occasion, Masinissa had to march to assist one of his sons to fight off an attack of Hispanics, possibly the 153 BC Lusitanian invasion headed by Caucenus, who has been speculated to have been in league with Carthage. The city certainly capitalized to sack Masinissa's lands.

Any hopes Masinissa may have had of extending his rule right across North Africa were dashed, however, with the Roman commissions sent to Africa to decide the territorial dispute between Masinissa and Carthage. He defeated the Punics, however, at the Battle of Oroscopa in 151 BC. In any case, animated probably by an irrational fear of a Carthaginian revival, but possibly by suspicion of the victorious Masinissa's ambitions, the elderly Marcus Porcius Cato advocated among the Romans, finally with success, the destruction of Carthage. Based on descriptions from Livy, the Numidians began raiding around seventy towns in the southern and western sections of Carthage's remaining territory. Outraged with their conduct, Carthage went to war against them, in defiance of the Roman treaty forbidding them to make war on anyone, thus precipitating the Third Punic War (149–146 BC). Masinissa showed his displeasure when the Roman army arrived in Africa in 149 BC, but he died early in 148 BC without a breach in the alliance. Ancient accounts suggest Masinissa lived beyond the age of 90 and was apparently still personally leading the armies of his kingdom when he died.

In 179 BC Masinissa received a golden crown from the inhabitants of Delos as he had offered them a shipload of grain. A statue of Masinissa was set up in Delos in honour of him as well as an inscription dedicated to him in Delos by a native from Rhodes. His sons too had statues of them erected on the island of Delos and the King of Bithynia, Nicomedes, had also dedicated a statue to Masinissa.

After his death, Micipsa succeeded to the throne, Micipsa had two sons, Hiempsal I and Adherbal, who took the power for a short period before being overthrown by their cousin Jughurta. Some of his descendants were the elder Juba I of Numidia (85 BC–46 BC) and younger Juba II (52 BC–AD 24).

== In literature, art and film ==
- Africa (late 1330s), an epic poem by Petrarch
- Sophonisbe (1680), a German mourning play by Daniel Casper von Lohenstein
- Cabiria (1914), classic Italian silent film directed by Giovanni Pastrone. Masinissa is portrayed by Vitale Di Stefano.
- Scipio the African (1971), Italian film directed by Luigi Magni. Masinissa is portrayed by Woody Strode.
- Pride of Carthage (2005), a novel by David Anthony Durham
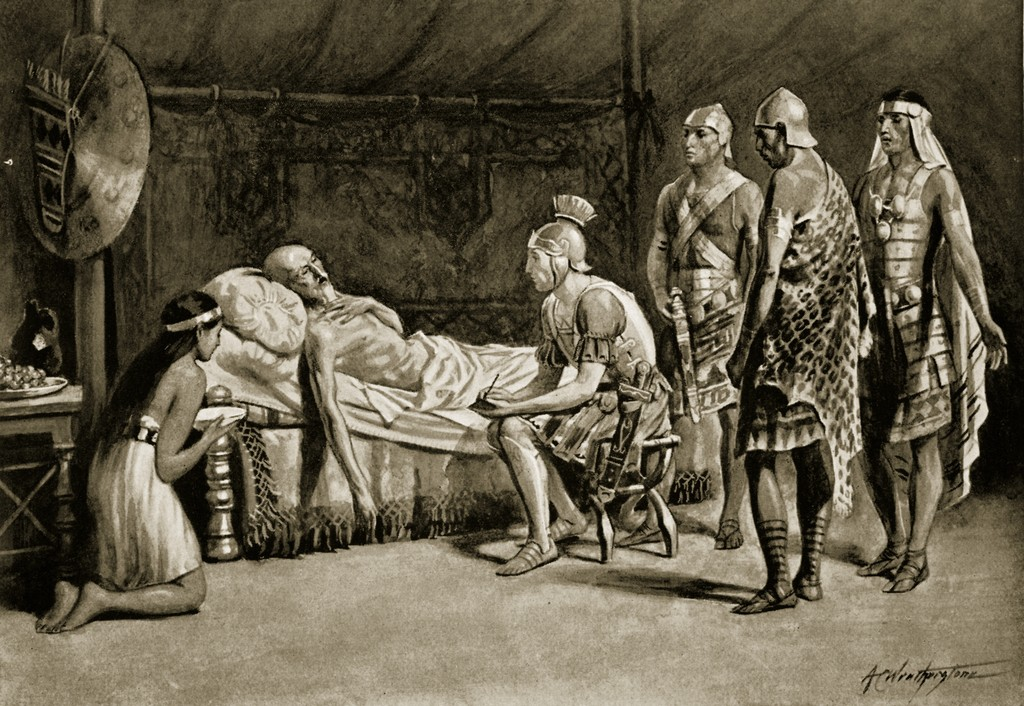
Scipio at the deathbed of Masinissa

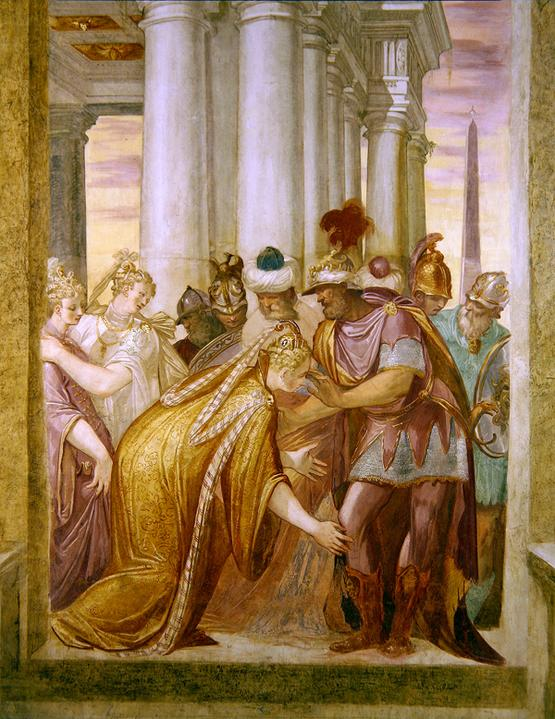
Central wall depicting Sophonisba requesting help from Massinissa

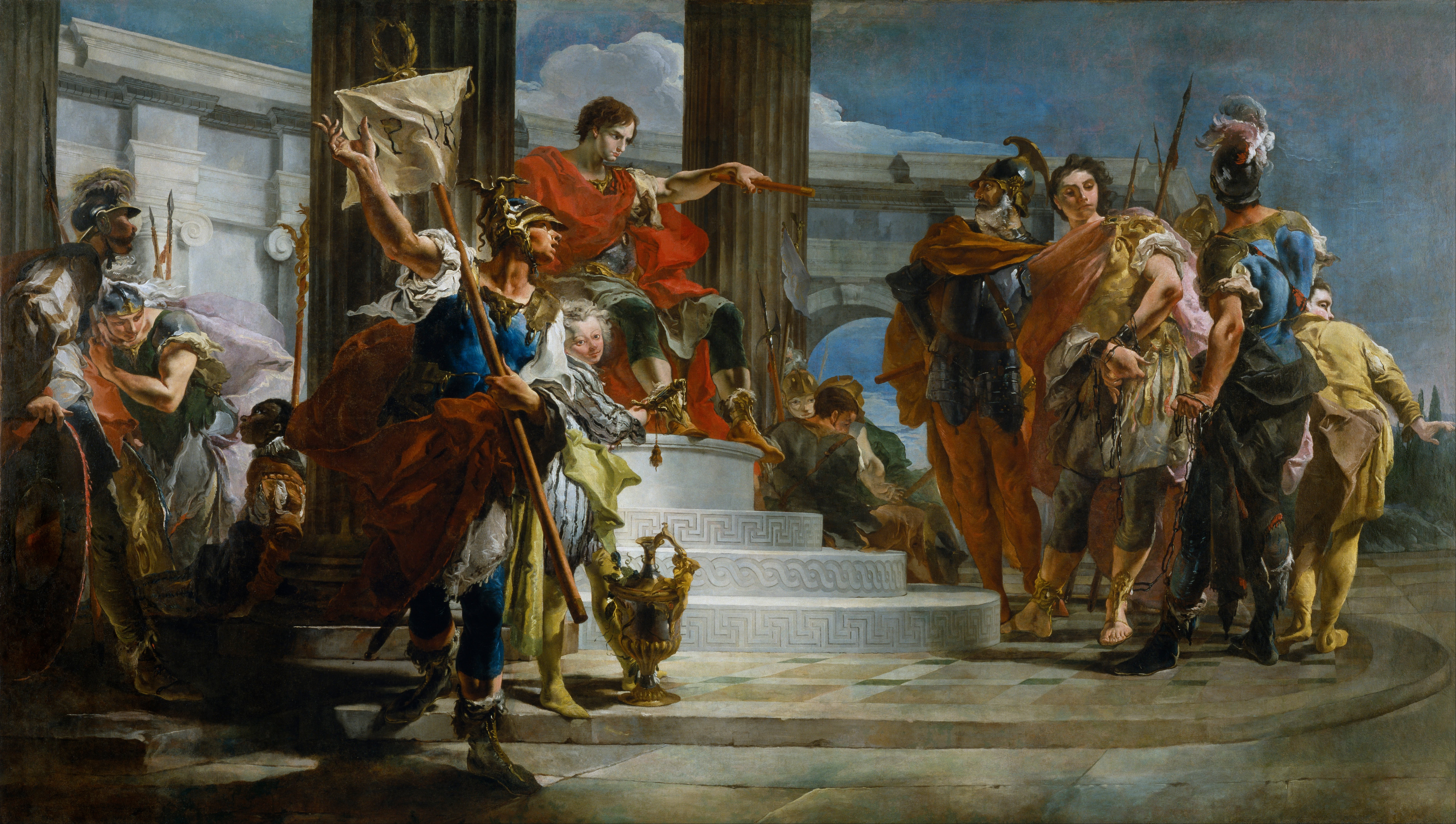
Scipio Africanus freeing Massiva

== See also ==
- List of kings of Numidia

== Bibliography ==
- Livy (trans. Aubrey de Sélincourt) (1965). The War With Hannibal. New York: Penguin Classics. ISBN 0-14-044145-X

Preceded by Himself (as King of the Massylii), Archobarzane (as King of the Masaesyli)	King of Numidia; 202–148 BC	Succeeded by Micipsa, Gulussa and Mastanabal
