= Niece and nephew =

Child of one's sibling or half-sibling

In the lineal kinship system used in the English-speaking world, a niece or nephew is a child of an individual's sibling or sibling-in-law. A niece is female and a nephew is male, and they would call their parents' siblings aunt or uncle. The gender-neutral term nibling has been used in place of the common terms, primarily in specialist literature.

As aunt/uncle and niece/nephew are separated by one generation, they are an example of a second-degree relationship. Unless related by marriage, they are 25% or more related by blood if the aunt/uncle is a full sibling of one of the parents, or 12.5% if they are a half-sibling.

== Etymology and lexicology ==
The word nephew is derived from the French word neveu which is derived from the Latin nepos. The term nepotism, meaning familial loyalty, is derived from this Latin term. Niece entered Middle English from the Old French word nece, which also derives from Latin nepotem.

The word nibling, derived from sibling, is a neologism suggested by Samuel Martin in 1951 as a cover term for "nephew or niece"; it is not common outside of specialist literature. Sometimes in discussions involving analytic material or in abstract literature, terms such as male nibling and female nibling are preferred to describe nephews and nieces respectively. Terms such as nibling are also sometimes viewed as a gender-neutral alternative to terms which may be viewed as perpetuating the overgenderization of the English language; it can also be used likewise to refer to non-binary relatives.

These French-derived terms displaced the Middle English nyfte, nift, nifte, from Old English nift, from Proto-Germanic *niftiz ('niece'); and the Middle English neve, neave, from Old English nefa, from Proto-Germanic *nefô ('nephew').

== Culture ==
In some patriarchal cultures, a nephew was the recipient of his uncle's inheritance if the latter did not have a successor. A nephew might have more rights of inheritance than the uncle's daughter.

However, in some matrilineal cultures, a mother's brother (the uncle) might be considered the "social father" of the children more than the biological father, who might not even be considered family.

In social environments that lacked a stable home or environments such as refugee situations, uncles and fathers would equally be assigned responsibility for their sons and nephews.

Among parents, some cultures have assigned equal status in their social status to daughters and nieces. This is, for instance, the case in Indian communities in Mauritius, and the Thai Nakhon Phanom Province, where the transfer of cultural knowledge such as weaving was distributed equally among daughters, nieces and nieces-in-law by the Tai So community, and some Garifuna people that would transmit languages to their nieces. In some proselytizing communities the term niece was informally extended to include non-related younger female community members as a form of endearment. Among some tribes in Manus Province of Papua New Guinea, women's roles as sisters, daughters and nieces may have taken precedence over their marital status in social importance.

== Additional terms ==
- A grandnephew or grandniece is the grandson or granddaughter of one's sibling. Also called great-nephew / great-niece.
- A half-niece or half-nephew is the child of one's half-sibling, related by 12.5%.

In some cultures and family traditions, it is common to refer to cousins with one or more removals to a newer generation using some form of the word niece or nephew. For more information see cousin.

Some languages, such as Polish, have different words for nieces and nephews depending on whether they are a brother's child or a sister's child: a brother's daughter is "bratanica" and a brother's son is "bratanek", while a sister's daughter is "siostrzenica" and a sister's son is "siostrzeniec".
