= Numidians =

Berber people in ancient Northern Africa

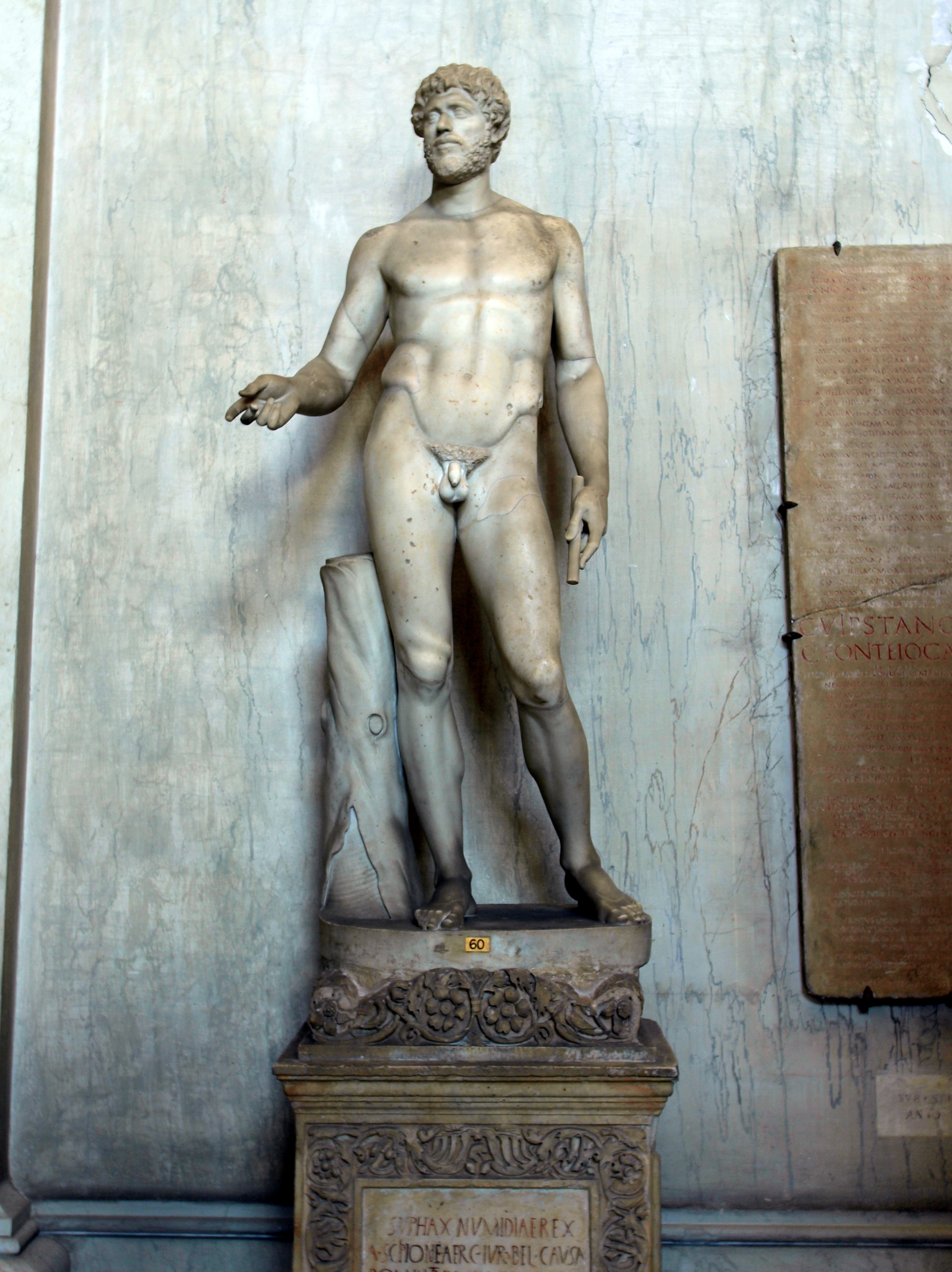
Statue of Syphax, a Numidian king

Numidia of Syphax and Gaïa before the unification

The Numidians were the Berber peoples of Numidia (present-day Algeria). They spoke an Afroasiatic language known as the Numidian language. The Numidians were originally a semi-nomadic people; they migrated frequently as nomads usually do, but during certain seasons of the year, they would return to the same camp. The Numidians soon became more than pastoralists and started to engage in more urban professions.

The Numidians were one of the earliest Berber tribes to trade with Carthaginian settlers. As Carthage grew, the relationship with the Numidians blossomed. Carthage's military used the Numidian cavalry as mercenaries. Numidia provided some of the highest quality cavalry of the Second Punic War, and the Numidian cavalry played a key role in several battles, both early on in support of Hannibal and later in the war after switching allegiance to the Roman Republic. Numidian culture flourished between the end of the Second Punic War and around the Roman conquest, with Masinissa as the first king of a unified Numidia.

== History ==
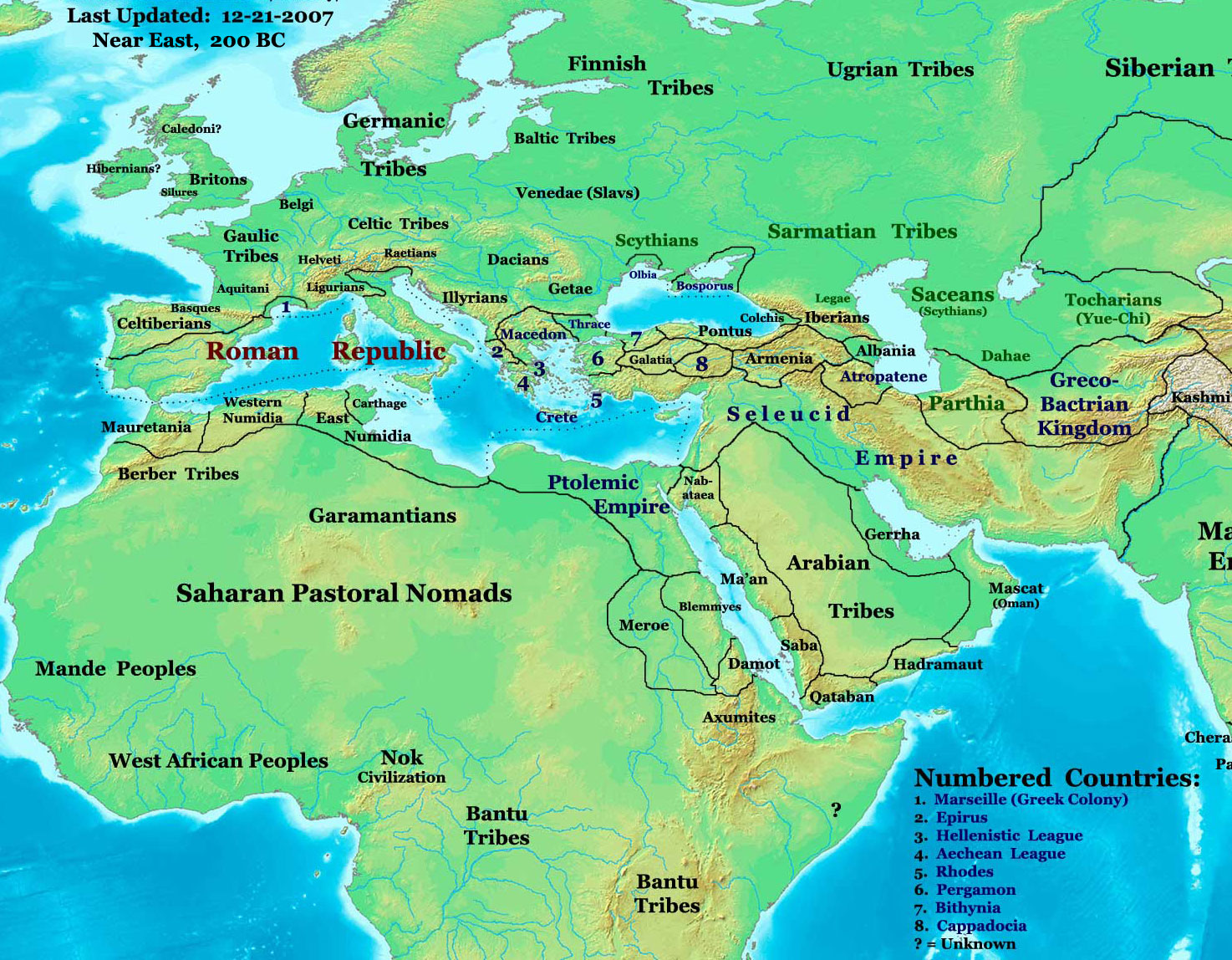
Western Old World in 200 BC, showing borders of the Numidian kingdoms after the Second Punic War.

=== Legendary Origins ===
According to Sallust, who cites a translation of a now-lost Carthaginian historical text, the Numidians descended from Persians who had served under Hercules before he died in Hispania. Numidians, originally a younger generation of Persians, split from their parents, according to Sallust, "because of the excess of population."

=== Reign of Masinissa ===
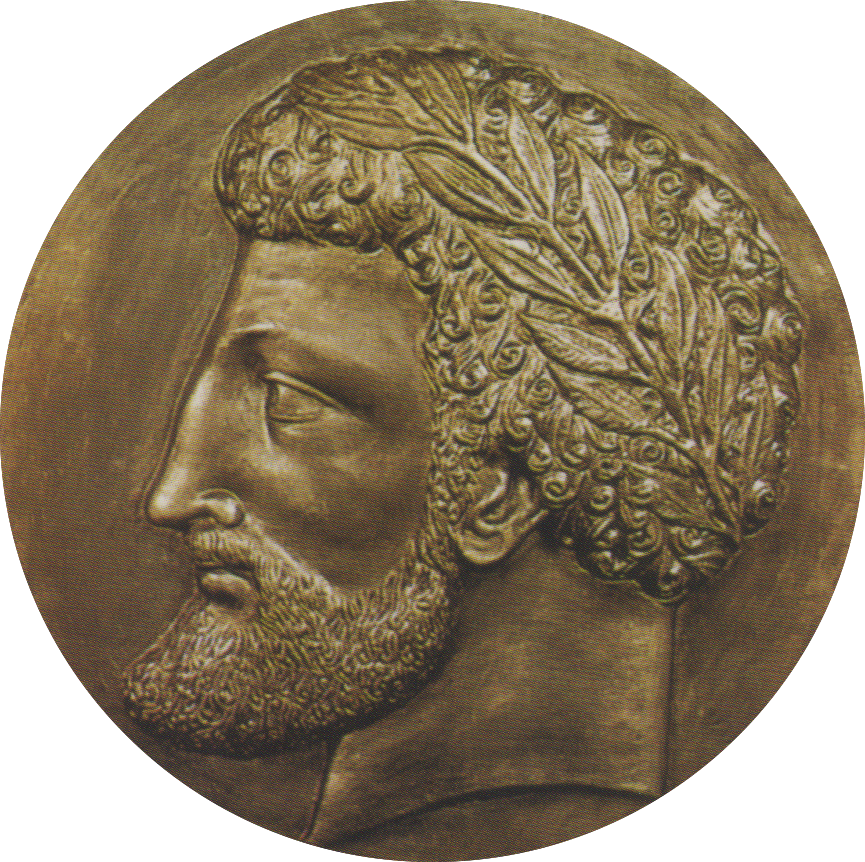
Masinissa (c. 240-148 BC), first king of Numidia

During the Second Punic War, Masinissa was the king of a Numidian tribe. The importance of his kingdom was secondary to that of the largest kingdom, that of the tribe of the Masaesyli, who were led by their king Syphax. Syphax had ended his alliance with Carthage in 213 BC, but five years later, he reestablished close, friendly relations when he married Sophonisba, daughter of Hasdrubal Gisco.

After the Second Punic War had begun, Masinissa allied with Rome to fight against Carthage. Masinassa fought alongside the Romans in Iberia, and led a contingent of cavalry in the decisive Battle of Zama, where his forces played a big role in Rome's victory. Syphax had tried to sue for peace between Hannon Barca and Publius Cornelius Scipio after the Romans had landed in Africa. With the help of Masinissa, Publius Scipio's troops set fire to Syphax's camp. The king Masinissa added Syphax's former territory to his eastern kingdom Massylii as a reward gained through military victory against Carthage.

After the Second Punic War, the peace treaty between Carthage and Rome prevented Carthage from entering any wars without Rome's permission. Masinissa exploited the treaty by taking Carthaginian land. He used various tricks to get land, including stating that Carthage was rebuilding their navy despite the treaty having prohibited a navy. Carthage appealed. Cato the Elder—who had served in a Roman Legion during the Second Punic War—was sent with a commission to mediate a settlement. The commission insisted that both sides agree to their final decision. Masinissa agreed, but Carthage refused because of how unfavourable previous Roman decisions had been. Carthage's refusal to accept the commission convinced Cato that the Third Punic War was needed. Cato made a series of speeches to the senate, all of which ended with "Ceterum censeo Carthaginem esse delendam" (Moreover, I advise that Carthage should be destroyed).

A group of Carthaginian senators supported a peace treaty with the Numidians. This group was in the minority, in part because the populace of Carthage did not want to submit to a people they had traditionally dominated. The pro-Numidian senators were exiled. After their exile, they went to Masinissa for help. Masinissa sent two sons to Carthage to ask for the pro-Numidian senators to be let back in. Carthalo, who led a democratic group that was against the Numidian encroachment, blocked their entry. Hamilcar, another leader of the same group, sent a party to attack Masinissa's sons.

Masinissa sent a force to siege the Carthaginian city of Oroscopa, but it was repelled by a Carthaginian army led by a Hasdrubal. Two of Masinissa's sons were captured. This became the final excuse for Rome to attack Carthage.

The successes of Masinissa's reign were not only military, as he also combined the Numidian people into a united nation with a focus on agricultural production. Masinissa's reign was a prosperous one for the most part. The king ruled from Syphax's former capital of Cirta, which may or not have originally been a Punic city. The center of his economic reforms was the development of intensive agriculture, doubling the production of both wheat and barley. Masinissa is also attributed with the introduction of formerly exotic crops such as olives and vineyards to Numidia.

In 149 BC, during the Third Punic War, Masinissa died of old age. Micipsa succeeded as the second king of Numidia.

== Culture and society ==
=== Lifestyle ===
The Numidians were not strictly nomadic nor were they strictly sedentary. Numidian communities along the desert and some arid mountainous areas tended to practice pastoralism more frequently, although this does not mean they did not engage in trade. These nomadic communities did trade with their settled brethren and even other societies. No matter how their economic activities function, nomadic societies often find themselves dependent on the goods produced by settled societies, particularly those that are considered to be luxury goods. Those Numidian communities who were sedentary lived along the coast or closer to Carthage, there is evidence of the presence of oil presses in the Numidian capital of Cirta as well as Punic-style architecture

=== Economy ===
Not unlike many other parts of the world at the time, the Numidian people based their economy on agriculture, although they also developed their own types of pottery. Although we do not have much information on the role economy played in migrating Numidian communities, due to their highly mobile way of life it is likely they faced constraints on food production, and therefore their economic activities were dominated by the acquisition of food, although the elites of these communities could acquire luxury items.

Settled communities relied more on agriculture. They cultivated cereals such as wheat and barley, and legumes such as beans, peas, and lentils. Husbandry also played a key role, especially of cattle and pigs. Their system of agriculture was sophisticated and resembled those found in other parts of the Mediterranean, Pliny noted that the town of Tacape (modern-day Gabès) had a highly-fertile oasis and the land around the city was relatively expensive. As trade developed, artisans became much more common in Numidian urban centers, Banasa, for example, was an important center of the Numidian pottery industry whilst the great tomb of Medracen and the temple of Simithu also show Numidian architecture outside of the Punic sphere. Despite this, grain remain the major source of trade as the region was rather famous for its grain production.

Depiction of Numidian Latin-language prose writer Apuleius, c. 330 AD

However, despite their engagement in the Mediterranean trade network, the Numidian people lacked a standard system of currency. Coins minted depicting the reign of kings and local fauna such as elephants have been found in Numidian sites, but it seems that the usage of coins was fairly limited and they could have very well been used almost exclusively to depict the prestige and power of certain kings

=== Social organization ===
Little is known of the organization of migratory Numidian communities, as the only evidence we have of the structure of Numidian society pertains to the monarchy. Although it might be associated with the Carthaginian sphere, the reality is that Numidian kingship was influenced and based on the ideals of Hellenistic monarchies found in other parts of the Mediterranean during this period. Kings were sanctified in death and were deemed responsible for the acculturation of their people.

== Warfare ==
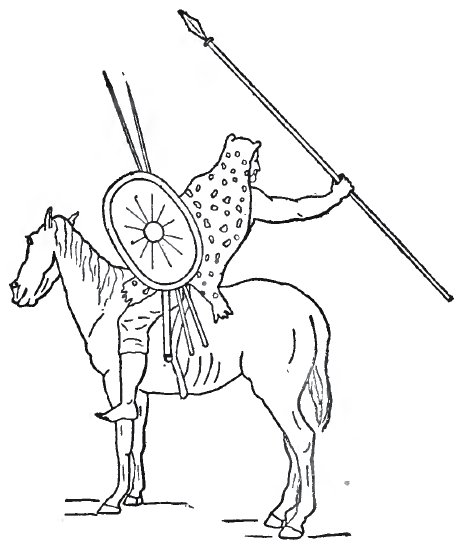
A Numidian cavalryman

Numidians practiced a highly mobile type of warfare, being especially known for their swift cavalry and hit-and-run tactics. Under Roman tutelage, they learned to form and march as infantry, as well as building forts, although they never abandoned their emphasis on ranged attacks and retreats. They also employed war elephants like those of Carthage.

Both their infantry and cavalry were lightly armed, their equipment being often tied to the economic level of the user. They favored the javelin as a ranged weapon, while for close quarters they employed swords and daggers, often supplied by or taken from the Romans. They would wear no armor, only protecting themselves with bucklers or oval shields made of leather. At least since the time of Numantine War, Numidians also had archers and slingers, which were deployed mainly to support their elephants.

Caesar recorded a feigned retreat tactic used against him by the Numidians, which combined light infantry and cavalry. They would attack mixed, only for the cavalry to retreat, apparently abandoning their comrades. When the enemy chased those, the cavalry would return and catch the pursuers off guard.

== See also ==
- List of Kings of Numidia
