= Massylii =

Berber federation in eastern Numidia

Massylii Massylii Kingdom 𐤌𐤔𐤋𐤉𐤉𐤌 mšlyym
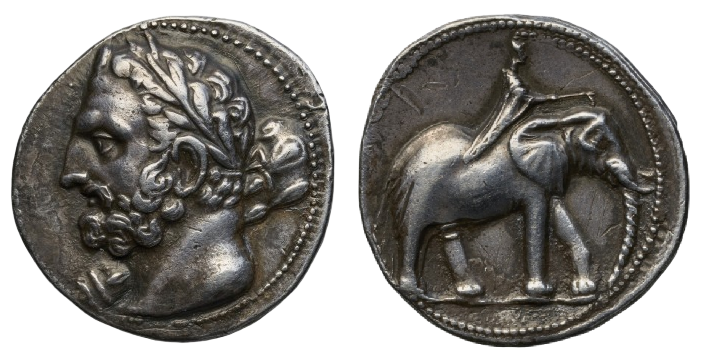
- Tridrachm struck during Micipsa's reign. Obv: Laureate bust of Micipsa facing left and holding a mace; rev: a hooded figure riding an elephant.

- Massylii kingdom (in yellow) 220 BC under king Gaia.
- Status: Confederation
- Capital: Cirta
- Official languages: Numidian language Punic language
- Religion: Various religions: Berber traditional religion Punic religion
- Government: Confederate monarchy
- Agellid (Note: The title began to be used under Gaia’s reign)
  - 814 BC – ? BC: Iarbas
  - 450 BC - 374 BC: Madghis
  - 374 BC - 344 BC: Iles
  - 344 BC – 310 BC: Aylimas
  - 310 BC - 274 BC: Niptasan
  - 274 BC – 260 BC: Zelalsan II
  - 260 BC – 207 BC: Gaia
  - 207 BC – 206 BC: Oezalces
  - 206 BC: Capussa Lacumazes Mazaetullus
  - 206 BC – 202 BC: Massinissa
- Historical era: Antiquity
- Currency: Multiple: Numidian coin Carthaginian coinage
- Today part of: Algeria; Tunisia

The Massylii or Maesulians (Neo-Punic: 𐤌𐤔𐤋𐤉𐤉𐤌, mšlyym) were a Berber confederation in eastern Numidia (western Tunisia and eastern Algeria), which was formed by an amalgamation of smaller tribes during the 4th century BC. They were ruled by a king. On their loosely defined western frontier were the powerful Masaesyli. To their east lay the territory of the rich and powerful Carthaginian Republic. Their relationship to Carthage resembled that of a protectorate. Carthage maintained its dominance over the Massylii by skillful diplomatic manoeuvering, playing off local tribal and kingdom rivalries. The principal towns of the Massylii were Cirta, Tébessa and Thugga.

== Etymology ==
The name Massylii is related to the toponym "Tamsilt" (in Tamazight)

== Mythology ==
The religion practiced by the Massyli was the Libyco-Berber religion, with the sun god Tafukt and the moon god Ayyur at the center of their pantheon. According to the Romans, the Massylii inhabited the woods of the Hesparides the mythical daughters of Atlas

== Succession ==
The internal political organization of the Massyl kingdom seems to have its own organization that was not an absolute monarchy. On the one hand, it is based on a tribal confederation that establishes its influence over various city-states, preserving relative autonomy. Dynastic succession is effected within the ruling branch, not from father to son, but by adelphic succession (Note: a system of dynastic or tribal inheritance where power or property passes laterally from brother to brother rather than vertically from father to son (primogeniture)) and birthright.

== Population ==
The Aurès, where the inhabitants of the Aures known as the Auresiens, are identified as the Chaouia, have been the cradle of the Massylii dynasty.

== Role in the Second Punic War ==
Unified Numidia map under Masinissa.

In 218 BC, war broke out between the Carthaginians and the Romans. The Massylii and the Masaesyli, who both possessed a strong and proficient cavalry force, were allied to the Carthaginian cause and performed valuable service for them in Iberia and Italy. In 206 BC, a Massylian prince called Masinissa defected to the Romans. Syphax was defeated by Masinissa and the Roman general Scipio Africanus in 203 BC at the Battle of Cirta just prior to Scipio's victory over Hannibal at the Battle of Zama in 202 BC, When the Romans and Massyli finally defeated the Carthaginians in 202 BC after the Battle of Zama, Masinissa annexed the lands of the Masaesyli, uniting the entire region under his leadership as the Kingdom of Numidia. The Masaesyli tribe essentially vanishes from history after 202 BC, thereby establishing the first unified Berber State in North Africa ruled entirely by Berbers. He ruled Numidia until his death in approximately 148 BC.

== See also ==
- Numidian language
