= Agellid =

Berber masculine noun meaning "king"

Agellid (plural igelliden or igeldan), tifinagh : ⴰⴳⴻⵍⵉⴷ, sometimes Gallicized as aguellid, is a Berber masculine noun meaning "king". The feminine equivalent "queen" is tagellidt or tagellitt (plural tigellidin).

== History: a Numidian title ==
It is one of the oldest attested political titles in the Amazigh world. It appears as early as Ancient History in Libyan inscriptions in the form "GLD," demonstrating a remarkable lexical continuity between ancient political structures and modern Berber dialects. In these inscriptions, "GLD" can designate both true sovereigns, such as the Numidian kings, and magistrates or local officials, showing that the function encompassed by this term was more diverse than a simple hereditary monarchy. This multiple usage suggests the existence, in Libyan societies, of various forms of authority where the title did not refer exclusively to absolute royal power, but could also apply to civic or community leaders. The term could, depending on the era and region, designate different levels of authority, from the local chief to the recognized sovereign, reflecting the diversity of political systems that characterized the Libyan-Berber communities of Antiquity. The word has also left traces in onomastics at different times, such as the name of the 4th-century Moorish prince Gildo, that of Gildan in Taucheira in Cyrenaica, or even Agellid, father of Moussa mentioned by Al-Bakri.

== A pan-Berber word ==
In contemporary Berber dialects, agellid' generally retains the meaning of "king," sometimes with a symbolic or traditional dimension. The word is widespread in northern Berber dialects, with the exception of the Tuareg region, which uses other terms to designate political authority. This persistence in living languages, as well as its presence in onomastics and various traditional narratives, illustrates the historical depth of the concept in Amazigh cultures. The term has the fundamental form agellid (plural: igeldan) in most Berber dialects, such as Kabyle and Shilha. A common regional variant, ažellid, appears in dialects where the consonant /g/ has evolved into /ž/ and then /š/, notably in the Mzab, Ouargla, and Ghadames regions. Although the term agellid disappeared from the titulature of the Numidian kings, it has been preserved in most Berber dialects, with the exception of the Tuareg domain where amenukal is used.

The meaning refers to a "very powerful monarch." It is also commonly applied to God in religious poetry. In importance, an agellid generally ranks above its Arabic-derived rival, ṣelṭan, which has been introduced into most northern dialects.
