= Numidian language =

Language spoken in ancient North Africa

Numidian
- Old Libyan
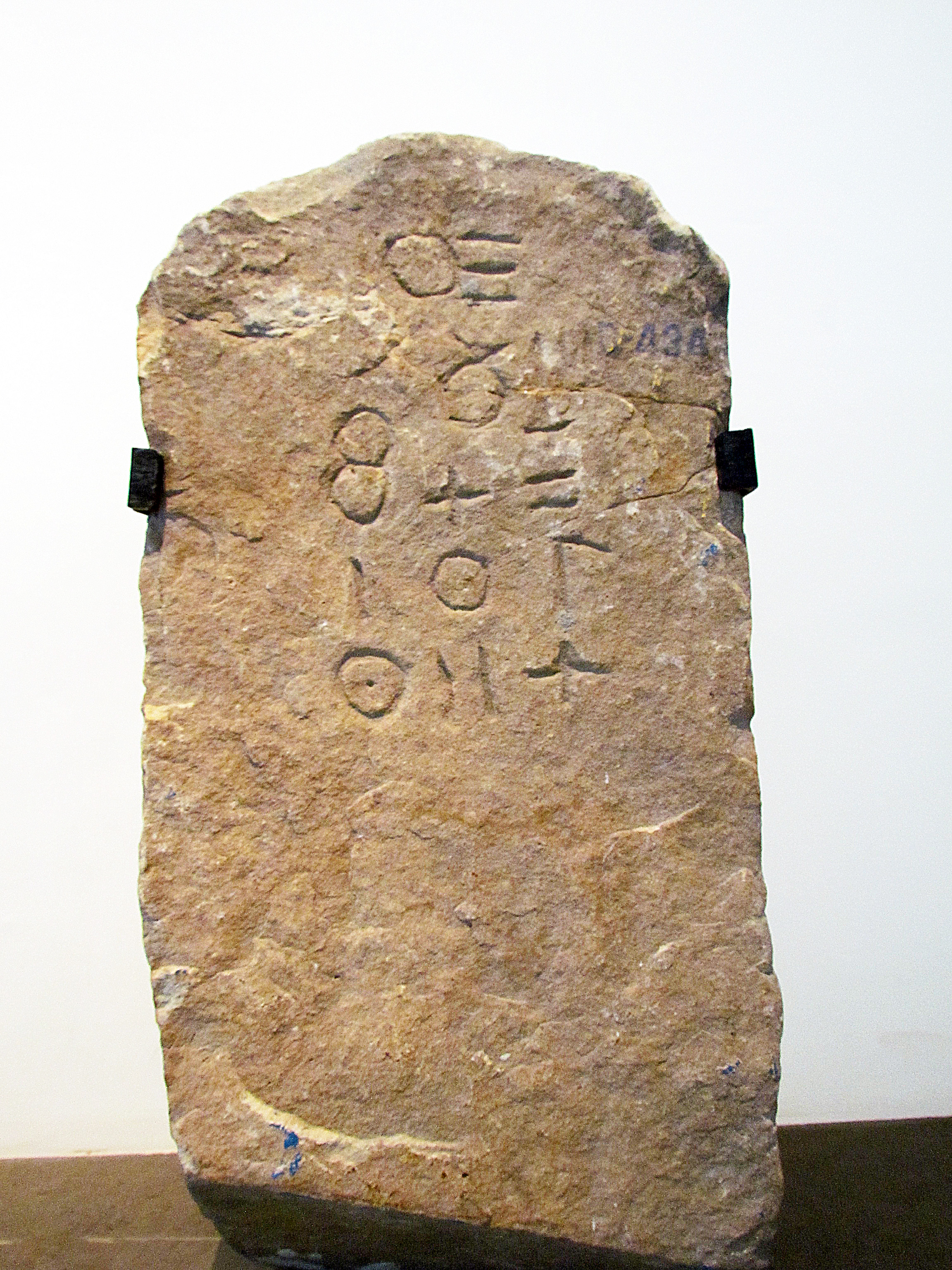
- Numidian stela with Libyc text in the Bardo National Museum
- Native to: ancient Numidia
- Region: Mainly modern day Algeria, parts of Tunisia and parts of west Libya (as result of Numidian expansion but with Libyan Berber languages)
- Ethnicity: Numidians
- Era: 3rd century BC to the 3rd century AD
- Language family: Afro-Asiatic: Berber ?; Numidian
- Early form: Proto-Berber ?
- Dialects: East-Numidian †; West-Numidian †; ? Mauretanian †; ? Gaetulian †
- Writing system: Libyco-Berber alphabet (Proto-Tifinagh)

Language codes
- ISO 639-3: nxm
- Glottolog: numi1241

Numidian (/n(j)ʊˈmɪdiən/ n(y)uu-MID-ee-ən) was an Afroasiatic language or dialect spoken in ancient Numidia. The script in which it was written, the Libyco-Berber alphabet (from which Tifinagh descended), has been almost fully deciphered and most characters (apart from a few exceptions restricted to specific areas) have known values. Libyco-Berber inscriptions are attested from the 3rd century BC to the 3rd century AD. As most surviving inscriptions are funerary steles with a simple format, only a few words have known meanings. The language can be confidently identified only as belonging to the Afroasiatic family, although it was likely part of the Berber languages, a part of a larger Libyco-Berber dialect continuum, precursor to the modern Berber languages, or possibly an extinct sister branch to the modern Berber languages.

== Classification ==
Whether Numidian itself was its own language or was part of a larger dialect continuum of Libyco-Berber language(s) is unsure. Not much is known about the variations of the old Libyco-Berber language(s) as none of them have been fully deciphered, and outside of some east-Numidian steles none of the various Old Libyc writings have been interpreted. This so-called Libyco-Berber was the early form of the modern Berber languages, although whether Numidian was a part of it directly and how strongly it was related to it cannot be ascertained. It may be possible that the language of the neighbouring Mauri people of modern-day Morocco may have been the same as Numidian, although there is little to no research into the language. It is known that by that stage the breakup of Proto-Berber into various Berber languages was still not fully complete, and thus the ancient Libyco-Berber languages of the time were very similar to each other, even more so than the modern ones, however differentiation has already begun by that stage among the larger sub-groups of Berber. Later writers like Saint Augustine, in relation to the Berber languages of North Africa declared that "In Africa, we define most of the barbarian tribes (barbaras gentes) with one language (in africa barbaras gentes in una lingua plurimas novimus)" which implies continuity in the region, though this may have been an oversimplification.

As the Massylii, who spoke the language, were ethnically Berber, it is supposed that Numidian was therefore a Berber language. It is not certain whether Numidian would fall within the modern Berber languages, be a part of a possible Libyco-Berber continuum that later developed into the modern Berber, or form a sister branch to them. Some theorize that it constituted a group of its own, as there is no trace of the noun-case system shared by the modern Berber languages. However, Proto-Berber is theorized to have no grammatical case either, which would also imply a later addition of the system. The Lybico-Berber tifinagh and the Phoenician alphabet being abjads without vowels complicates the matter even more.

Based on modern linguistic comparison, it can be asserted that Numidian was not Proto-Berber, which may have preceded it rather, nor part of the Western Berber languages or Tuareg languages. If Numidian was somewhere in the Berber family tree, it was most probably an early form of the Northern Berber languages, possibly a part of a dialect continuum speaking an early form of the language group, although the possibility of it being related to the Eastern Berber languages cannot be ruled out with certainty due to the low amount of material, even if the Northern Berber hypothesis is more likely.

=== Dialects and foreign influences ===
It is known that there was an orthographical difference between the western and eastern Numidian. Starting at Kabylia, which was a kind of mixed region, the regions to the east all the way to what is east of modern-day Tunisia and western parts of Libya used the east Libyan writing system, while the regions to the west all the way to approximately the Moulouya river in modern-day Morocco used the larger and still undecoded west Libyan writing system, though whether this was an orthographical difference, or a more serious linguistic difference is unsure. Numidian was influenced mostly by Punic and then Latin, although Numidian and even some modern Berber vocabulary seem to have been also slightly influenced by the Paleohispanic languages and possibly by other Pre-Indo-European languages.

=== Other ancient Berber or Para-Berber languages ===
In circa 500 B.C various nomadic Berber groups penetrated the Sahara from the north, corresponding the area of the later Gaetulians. It is known that Pliny the Elder described the Saharan Gaetulian language as very similar or the same as the Numidian one, implying that the Gaetulian language may have been the same as Numidian.

== Reconstruction ==
Work on deciphering the language has not been decisive, although especially recently some tried to reconstruct words by comparing Numidian script to proto- and modern Berber languages. Most remaining inscriptions are funerary, and follow the formula of "X w-Y" (X son of Y). BNS is also an often returning words in this script, which probably meant "tomb of". Many words had an H at the end of them, the function of which is unclear. A few gravestones show a different word between the two personal names, plausibly interpreted as a kinship term based on Berber comparisons: wlt "daughter (of)" (modern Berber wəltma meaning "sister" possibly compound of "daughter of mother"), and, more rarely, mt "mother (of)" (modern Tuareg ma). Similar to the modern berber languages, the ta-...-t circumfix signified feminine version of the word with a silent h added to the end. In the Dougga inscriptions some political positions are mentioned, such as "gld" (lord) which based on this technique, can be translated into the modern berber word "a-ǵăllid" which originates from the proto-berber word "*agăllid". A few verbs have been unambiguously identified in the various inscriptions. Comparison with modern Berber suggests that ṣkn, probably read as "eṣ(ə)k-n based on modern berber comparison which means"built" is to be analysed as ṣk "build" plus -n, marking 3pl subject agreement (-ən).

An example of translation using this method can be demonstrated on a part of a Numidian inscription which is read as "Msnsn. gldt. w-gjj." "Msnsn" is the name of king Massinissa while "gldt" is the word for king. Finally, "w-gjj" means "son of Gaia". Thus by attempting to translate the Numidian text through modern and proto-Berber the inscription would read "Massinissa the king, son of Gaia".

Numidian also featured and shared most or all of its prepositions "n" (of) and "d" (and) with modern Berber, along with various prefixes, such as "ta...-t", "m-" etc. with modern Berber.

These facts would strongly suggest that Numidian is a now extinct branch of the Berber languages, although some linguists believe that Numidian is not an ancestor but an extinct sister branch to the modern surviving Berber languages.

If the translations of "SBS" (asebbas) in the Thugga inscription as "year" is correct then that would mean the Proto-Berber form "ww" which evolved into "gg" or "gʷ" in most modern Berber languages was "bb" or "bʷ" in Numidian. This is only found in the Zenaga language of Mauritania and a few instances of Kabyle in modern times. As Zenaga was one of the first Berber languages to split off from the Proto-Berber group and thus still possesses many ancient characteristics, along with the Numidian usage of this form, could suggest that in the evolution of Berber languages "ww" turned into "bʷ" and then into "gʷ".

=== Naming conventions ===
Numidian names generally often followed a complicated, but well documented naming convention of Berber antiquity and medieval times. While this wasn't always the case, this was especially true for nobles or higher leaders. The way it worked was simple: Verb in the 3rd person + personal pronouns as an affix (direct or indirect) in 3rd person plural form (he/she-X-they/of them).

For example, the actual name of Jughurta most likely sounded as "y-uger-ten" (he who surpasses them), while the name of king Massinissa (MSNSN in Libyco-Berber) was "mas-nsen" (their seignor). Much of the onomastic work on the Numidian language was done by Salem Chaker, who through his work also help in decoding a few words in the language through dissecting known names.

=== Proposed words, cognates, and meanings ===
Here is a comparison of the few known Numidian words to modern Northern Berber languages and the Tamashek language. Normalized words with vowels added are written in the brackets. Underlined words are based on etymologic or onomastic reconstructions from Numidian names.

Numidian	Northern Berber languages	Tuareg languages	English
Political positions and jobs
GLD (a-gəllid)	agellid or a-žellid	amănokal	chief or king
TGLT(H) (Ta-gəllit)	Tagellidt or Tagellit	tamănokalt	queen
MNKD(H) (amenkad)	amenkad		Possibly emperor
MSWH (amsiweɣ?)	aserdas	əssărdasi	Possibly soldier or guard based on linguistic reconstruction
GLDMṢK (a-gellid imeṣka)	agellid imeska	amănokal ălbănna	Unknown, corresponds with Punic "chief of fifty", may be reconstructed as "chief of the builders/masons"
NBBN (inababen?)	imahalen, yixeddamen	imǝsɡuyya	workers
MWSN(H) (amawsan)	amussnaw	amûssen	Possibly sage or wise man
GẒB (agẓab)			Unknown, possibly "inspector of construction"
MṢṢKW (amṣeṣkaw)	amasgad, ameṣkad		possibly architect
MS (mass)	mass	măss	honorary title for men. May be translated as "sir" or "seignor", (From name Masinissa)
MSTN (amastan)	amastan	amastan	defender/protector (from name Mastanabal)
Verbs
RN (rna or erna)	ernu, erna, or erni	ernu	achieve victory, inflict defeat upon someone (from name: Yernaten)
ṢK (eṣk)	eṣk or bnu	kann or dăy	build
YS (yusa)	yusa or as-d	ǝqqăl	come or came
DR (idir)	idir		to live
BDD (bded)	bded		to stand
FL (afel?)	zger		to cross
Materials
ZLH (uzzal?)	uzzal	tăzoli	iron
Š?RH (a-šɣarh?)	a-sɣar	esăɣer	wood
Affixes and prepositions
NS (-ennes)	-nnes, -is or -es	-ənnes	its
N (n)	n	n	of (pertaining to something)
D (d)	d	d	and
-TN (-ten)	-ten	-san	them
-NSN (-nsen)	-nsen	-nesǝn	their
y-	y-	y-	he (third person masculine singular verb subject affix)
t-	t-	t-	she (third person feminine singular verb subject affix)
WR (war)	ur	wǝr	not
Kinship terms
W (u- or w-)	u-	ăw-	son of
WLT (wəlt-)	wəlt	wălăt	daughter of
MT (mat?)	yimma, yemma	ma	mother of
Others
SBS (asəbbas)	assewas, assegwas or asseggas	awăṭay	Possibly year, although Numidian translation is unsure
ẒK (aẓekka)	aẓekka	aẓəkka	tomb
ugər or agər	uger or agar	agǝr	to surpass (from name Jugurtha)
yif or if	if or af	uf	to be superior (from name Yiften)
MSKR or MSKRH (ameskar or miskiri)			Unsure, either cognate to Kabyle and Tuareg word ameskar,^{[Note 1]} or denoting the Misciri tribe

As previously noted, if Numidian was a part of the Berber family tree, it was most likely an early form of the Northern Berber languages, such as the Zenati languages, Shilha language, and the Kabyle language although the modern northern Berber languages have gone through grammatical changes, and they have also taken loanwords from Arabic, Latin, and French.

According to many linguists the H at the end of many numidian words were either silent or disappeared by modern times, or was theorized that in many cases such as MSWH or MWSNH was possibly used as a replacement for, or possibly was the ancestor of the modern berber ɣ sound. More recent analysis may suggest that the H at the end of words was possibly indicative of the word ending in a vowel based on comparisons with parallel Latin and Punic language texts.

== Thugga inscription ==
The Thugga inscription is the longest known Numidian inscription as of yet, and has served with the most clues regarding the language.

Numidian script

ṢKN•TBGG•BNYFŠ•MSNSN•GLDṮ•WGYY•GLDṮ•WZLLSN•ŠFṬ

SBSNDH•GLDṮ•SYSH•GLD•MKWSN

ŠFṬ•GLDṮ•WFŠN•MWSNG•ŠNK•WBNY•WŠNK•DŠFṬ•WM

WTNKW•MṢṢKW•MGN•WYRŠTB•WSDYLN•GẒB•MGN•WŠFṬ•MW

WŠMN•GLDṮ•GLDGMYL•ZMR•WMSNF•WŠMN•GLDMṢK•M

WŠYN•GLDṮ•WMGN•GLDṮ•ṬNYN•ŠYN•WNKKN•WFṬŠ•DR

ŠFṬ•WŠNK•

Possible vocalization

əṣk(ə)-n Tubgag BNYFŠ[?] Masnsen a-gəllidṯ u-Gayya a-gəllidṯ u-Zelalsen šufeṭ

Asəbbas NDH a-gəllidṯ(?) s-yusa a-gəllid Mikiwsan

Translation from Punic

The people of Thugga built this temple for Masinissa the King son of Gaia the King son of Zilalsan the Judge, in the tenth year since Micipsa ruled, in the year of Shufet the King son of Afshan the King, The Centurion: Shanok son of Banay and Shufet son of Magon son of Tanaku. The ms s kwy Magon son of Yirashtan son of Sadyalan, and gzby: Magon son of Shufet the Centurion son of Abdeshmun the King. Erectors of this property: Ashyan son of Ankikan son of Patash and Arash son of Shufet son of Shanok.

== Example texts ==
These texts are examples of bilingual inscriptions with known meanings, most of which are funerary texts.

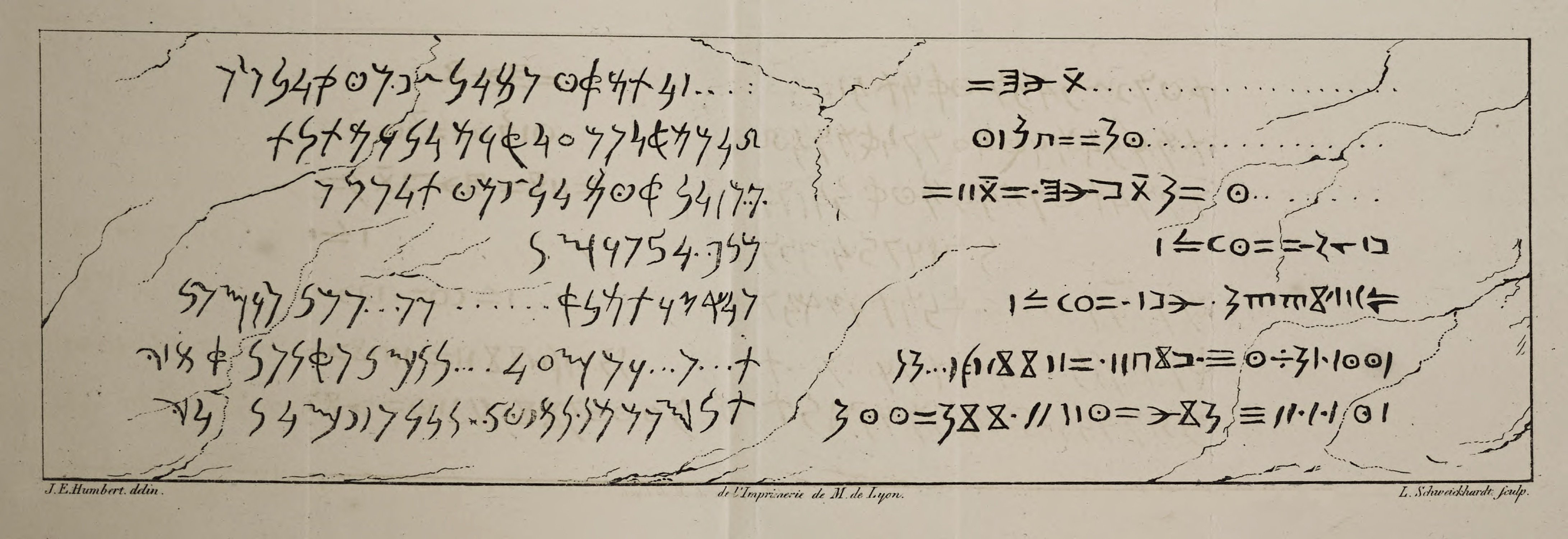
The first published sketch of the Ateban inscription

=== Bilingual texts ===
==== Cenotaph inscription ====
Punic

[mn]ṣbt š'ṭbn bn ypmṭt bn plw

hbnm š'bnm ʕb'rš bn ʕbdštrt

zmr bn 'ṭbn bn ypmṭt bn plw

mngy bn wrsbn

wb'zrt šl' **t* zzy wṭmn wwrskn

hḥršm šyr msdl bn nnpsn w'nkn b[n] 'šy

hnskm šbrzl špṭ bll wppy bn bby

Punic to English translation

The monument of 'ṭbn son of Ypmṭt son of Plw.

Builders of the stones: ʕb'rš son of ʕbdštrt;

Zmr son of 'ṭbn son of Ypmṭt son of Plw;

Mngy son of Wrsbn.

And for its ???, Zzy son of Ṭmn and Wrskn.

Workers of the wood: Msdl son of Nnpsn and 'nkn son of 'šy.

Casters of the iron: Šfṭ son of Bll and Ppy son of Bby.

Numidian

****N WYFMṬT W*******DRŠ WWDŠTR

*****BN WYFMṬṮ WFLW

MNGY WWRSKN

KSLNS ŻŻY WṬMN WRSKN

NBBN NŠ[Q]RH MSDL WNNFSN NKN WŠY

NB*N NZLH ŠFṬ WBLL FFY WBBY

Possible vocalization

Aṭeban w-Yefmaṭat w-Falu****D'rš w-Wadaštar

Zamir w-Aṭeban w-Yefmaṭat w-Falu

Mangy w-Wareskan

KSLNS Żaży w-Ṭaman w-Raskn

inababen n a-šɣarh Masdil w-Nanafsen Naken w-šy

inababen (?) n uzzal Šufeṭ w-Balil Fafy W-Beby

==== Kef Beni Fredj inscriptions ====
Latin

SACTUT•IHIMIR F•VIXIT•ANORVM•LXX H[SE]

Latin to English

Sactut son of Ihimir lived 70 years. [He is buried here.]

Numidian

ZKTT WYMR MTYBLH MSWH MNKDH

Normalization and adding of known or possible vowels

Zaktut w-Iymir MTYBLH amsiweɣ amenkad

Possible vocalization

Zaktut son of Iyimir MTYBLH soldier of the emperor.

=== Monolingual texts ===
Monolingual texts have no known meaning, and all translations are purely speculative and based on contextual clues alongside comparison with known grammar, vocabulary and possible links to modern or proto-berber cognates.

==== Kerfala stele ====
The Kerfala stele originates from possibly the late Numidian or early Roman periods. Written in the eastern Libyco-Berber script, it was found near the village of Kerfala near Lakhdaria, in what is considered the western parts of Numidia, making it an unusual find. Whether it was written in the same dialect as the other Numidian texts which mostly originate from eastern Algeria, or western Tunisia is unknown. The stele was analyzed by Salem Chaker who proposed the following interpretation.

Original text

SLMDNKZWSKDBṮN

GLDMṢKMSKSBN

MZRMṮR

WRBY WMSWH

Possible vocalization

Salmedenkez w-Sakedbaten

a-gellid imeṣka Mesekesben

mazar mutar

ur-ibbiy wemsiw

Proposed interpretation

Salmedenkez son of Sakedbaten

Chief of fifty/builders Mesekesben^{[Note 2]}

the tomb that they built, that it does not deteriorate or age

== See also ==
- Punic-Libyan Inscription, which helped decoding the Libyco-Berber script
- Kehek language

== Notes ==
Meaning either "the good one" or the "resting one".

MSKSBN might be potentially identified with "Masacesbenorum" a tribe mentioned in an inscription elsewhere (likely vocalization would be "Imeskesben"), or might possibly be the personal name of the person bearing the title of GLDMṢK ("Meskesben"). The unclear nature of the title GLDMṢK complicates identification more. Whether GLDMṢK as a title pertains to SLMDNKZ or MSKSKBN is hard to decide.
