= Warrant officer (disambiguation) =

Warrant officer is an officer in a military organization who is designated by a warrant, as distinguished from a commissioned officer.

Warrant officer or Warrant Officer may also refer to:

- Warrant officer (United Kingdom), the highest non-commissioned rank in the British Armed Forces
- Warrant officer (United States), an officer above the senior-most enlisted ranks, as well as officer cadets and candidates, but below the officer grade
- Assistant warrant officer, a rank in Pakistan Air Force above Senior Technician and below Warrant Officer
- Canadian Forces Chief Warrant Officer, the senior non-commissioned member appointment in the Canadian Forces
- Chief of the Air Staff's Warrant Officer, the senior warrant officer of the Royal Air Force
- Chief warrant officer, the most senior Army and Air Force non-commissioned member (NCM) rank of the Canadian Forces
- First warrant officer, a Warrant Officer rank in the Singapore Armed Forces
- Master warrant officer, a military rank in the Canadian Forces and the Singapore Armed Forces
- SAFWOS Leadership School, a Singapore Armed Forces training school within the Pasir Laba Camp complex for warrant officers
- Second warrant officer, a Warrant Officer rank in the Singapore Armed Forces
- Senior warrant officer, a Warrant Officer rank in the Singapore Armed Forces
- Station Warrant Officer, the senior Warrant Officer on a British Royal Air Force station (base)
- Third warrant officer, a Warrant Officer rank in the Singapore Armed Forces
- Warrant Officer Basic Course, technical training a new US Army Warrant Officer receives after warrant officer candidate school
- Warrant Officer Candidate School (United States Army), the entry-level training for Warrant Officer Candidates in the United States Army
- Warrant Officer of the Navy, the most senior non commissioned officer rank in the Royal Australian Navy (RAN)

== See also ==
- Warrant Officer 1 (disambiguation)
- Warrant (disambiguation)
- Office (disambiguation)
- Officer, a person who has a position of authority in a hierarchical organization
