= Battle of Acerrae =

Roman victory in the Social War

- Part of Social War
Date	90 BC
Location	Acerrae, Italy
Result	Roman victory

Belligerents
Roman Republic	Italian rebels

Commanders and leaders
Lucius Julius Caesar	Gaius Papius Mutilus

Casualties and losses
Unknown	About 6,000

Campania and Acerrae

The Battle of Acerrae was fought during the Social War between Roman forces under Lucius Julius Caesar, not to be confused with the triumvir, and rebel forces under Gaius Papius Mutilus.

Caesar, having recently lost almost his entire force in a spectacular defeat near Aesernia, had a force consisting of Gallic, Mauritanian, and Numidian forces. When Papius brought forward Oxynta, a son of the former king of Numidia, Jugurtha, many of Caesar’s Numidian troops switched sides, Caesar having to send the rest away to prevent further desertion.

When Papius attacked Caesar’s fortified camp Caesar charged out through another gate with his cavalry, falling on the exposed rebel force, killing 6,000 men, a large portion of the enemy force. This was the first Roman victory of the Social War but was probably pyrrhic in nature, as a number of Italian communities in the region joined the rebels around this time and Caesar lost his Numidian troops. This forced Caesar to withdraw and even cede territory to Papius soon after the battle.
