= Royal sign-manual =

Signature of a monarch onto a legislative act, decree, etc

The royal sign-manual is the signature of the sovereign, by the affixing of which the monarch expresses their pleasure either by order, commission, or warrant. A sign-manual warrant may be either an executive act (for example, an appointment to an office), or an authority for affixing the Great Seal of the pertinent realm. The sign-manual is also used to give power to make and ratify treaties. Sign manual, with or without hyphen, is an old term for a handwritten signature in general. It is also referred to as sign manual and signet.

== Commonwealth realms ==
The royal sign-manual of Queen Elizabeth I

The royal sign-manual of King George III

The signature of King Edward VIII as King-Emperor

The royal sign-manual of Elizabeth II

=== Composition ===
The royal sign-manual usually consists of the sovereign's regnal name (without number, if otherwise used), followed by the letter R for Rex (king) or Regina (queen). Thus, the signs-manual of both Elizabeth I and Elizabeth II read Elizabeth R. When the British monarch was also Emperor or Empress of India, the sign manual ended with R I, for Rex Imperator or Regina Imperatrix (king-emperor or queen-empress).

When the future George IV, then the Prince of Wales, became regent on behalf of his incapacitated father, George III, the Regency Act 1811 expressly directed that the prince should sign "George P R", the initials standing for Princeps Regens meaning prince regent.

=== Uses ===
Some letters patent are not signed by the monarch in person. Instead, the monarch signs a warrant authorizing the preparation of the letters patent (traditionally written in ceremonial calligraphy on vellum) and approving the draft text of the letters patent. Then, once the letters patent are prepared, they are sealed with the Great Seal without the need for the signature of the monarch, because royal authority for issuing the letters patent had already been given by means of the warrant. Those letters patent finish with the words "By warrant under the King/Queen's Sign Manual", to signify that they do not bear the sign-manual themselves, having already been approved by warrant signed by the sovereign.

Other letters patent, due to the nature of their contents (such as those that authorise the expenditure of money, or those that signify royal assent to Acts of Parliament), require the royal sign-manual to be affixed directly to them. Such letters patent contain, at the bottom, the words: "By the King/Queen Him/Herself, signed with His/Her own hand". The royal sign-manual is usually placed by the sovereign at the top of the document. These papers usually must be countersigned by a principal secretary of state or other responsible minister.

In some cases, the use of the sign-manual has been dispensed with and a stamp affixed in lieu thereof, as in the case of George IV, whose bodily infirmity made the act of signing difficult and painful during the last weeks of his life. The Royal Signature by Commission Act 1830 (11 Geo. 4 & 1 Will. 4. c. 23) was passed providing that a stamp might be affixed in lieu of the sign-manual, but the sovereign had to express his consent to each separate use of the stamp, the stamped document being attested by a confidential servant and several officers of State.

== Kingdom of the Netherlands ==
The signature of King Willem-Alexander of the Netherlands

According to article 47 of the constitution of the Netherlands, all Acts of Parliament and Royal Decrees have to be signed by the King and by one or more Ministers or State Secretaries (called a countersign). No one else can sign on behalf of the King. When he is abroad, he can sign using a tablet computer, but will still sign the paper original upon his return.

== See also ==
- Royal assent
- Signum manus
- Royal cypher
- Royal charter
- Royal warrant (disambiguation)
- Letters patent
- Calligraphy
- Autograph letter (Holy See)
- Name change#Historical usage
