= Battle of Taenum =

Roman battle of the Social War

Coordinates: 41.25°N 14.066667°E

- Part of Social War
| Date | 90 BC |
| Location | Teanum Sidicinum, modern Teano, Italy |
| Result | Rebel victory |

Belligerents
| Roman Republic | Italian rebels |

Commanders and leaders
| Lucius Julius Caesar | Marius Egnatius |

Strength
| 35,000 | |

Casualties and losses
| 8,000 | Unknown |

The Battle of Taenum (also spelled Teanum) was fought in 90 BC during the Social War. In the battle, Roman forces under the command of Lucius Julius Caesar were defeated by Italian rebel forces commanded by Marius Egnatius.

As Lucius Caesar moved his army composed of 30,000 infantry and 5,000 cavalry through a defile, he was ambushed and attacked by the rebels. Although many of his men were killed during the initial ambush, the Romans were able to fight their way through a frantic retreat to the town of Teanum where they took up a defensive position. It has been reported that Lucius Caesar lost 8,000 of his 35,000.

This rebel victory offset their previous defeat at Acerrae. During the battle, Lucius Caesar himself was sick. During the retreat, he had to be evacuated on a litter.
