= Unofficial =

Something unofficial is not established or authorized by an authority. It can also be a person not acting with official authority.

- Unofficial Bar, in Sri Lankan courts
- Unofficial collaborator, former East Germany
- Unofficial hearing, in US Congress
- Unofficial magistrate, in Sri Lanka
- Unofficial Member, Hong Kong
- Unofficial patch, computer software
- Unofficial Saint Patrick's Day, a local alternative celebration date for Saint Patrick's Day for students at the University of Illinois Urbana-Champaign

== See also ==
- Official (disambiguation)
