= Warnant =

Warnant may refer to:

- Warnant, Namur, a district of the municipality of Anhée, Namur, Wallonia, Belgium
- Warnant-Dreye, also called "Warnant", a district in the municipality of Villers-le-Bouillet, Liège, Wallonia, Belgium

== See also ==
- Warrant (disambiguation)
