= BLG =

BLG may refer to:

- Barlow Lyde & Gilbert, a British law firm
- Belaga Airport, Sarawak, Malaysia
- Beluga Airport, Alaska
- β-Lactoglobulin
- Bilibili Gaming, a Chinese esports franchise
- BLG Logistics, a German seaport and logistics company in Bremen
- Borden Ladner Gervais, a Canadian law firm
- Burke's Landed Gentry, a genealogical publication
