= Imperator =

Rank in ancient Rome

The title of imperator (/ˌɪmpəˈreɪtər/ im-pə-RAY-tər) was originally the rough equivalent of commander under the Roman Republic. Later, it became a part of the titulature of the Roman emperors as their praenomen. The Roman emperors generally based their authority on multiple titles and positions, rather than preferring any single title. Nevertheless, imperator was used relatively consistently as an element of a Roman ruler's title throughout the Principate and the later Roman Empire. It was abbreviated to "IMP" in inscriptions. The word is an agentive form of the verb imperare, meaning "to order, to command". The English word emperor derives from imperator via French.

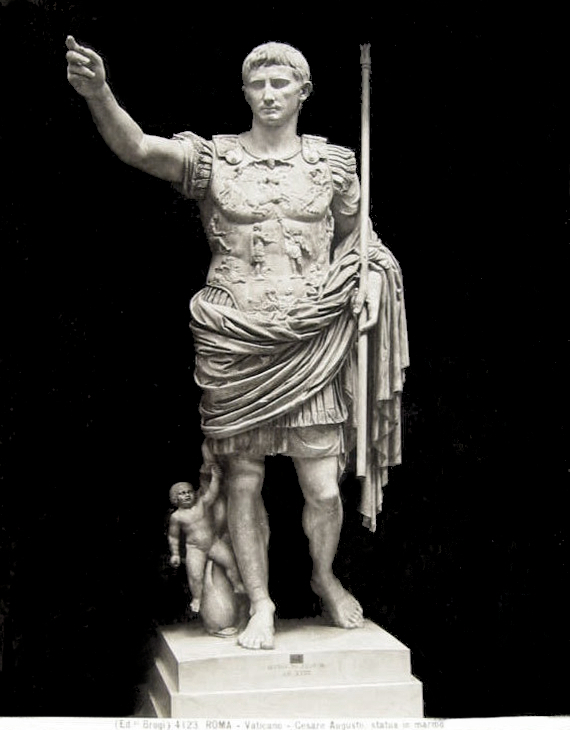
Marble statue of Augustus of Prima Porta, showing him in a pose of imperator (1st century AD)

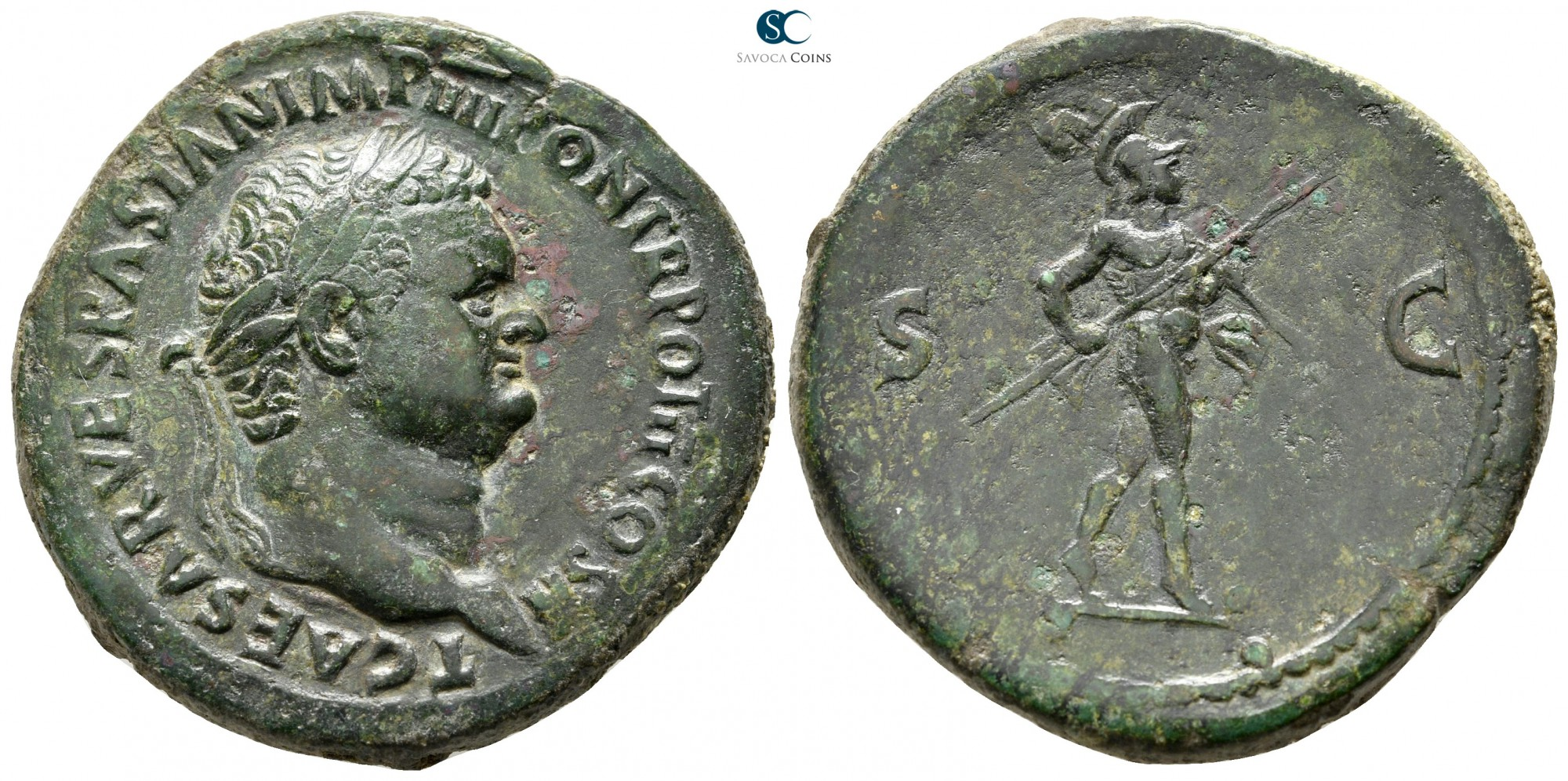
Roman sestertius of Emperor Titus with the inscription T CAESAR VESPASIAN (Titus Caesar Vespasianus) IMP IIII (Imperator Quartum) PON (Pontifex) TR POT II (Tribunicia Potestate Secundum) COS II (Consul Secundum). IMP IIII indicates four great victories by Titus and the associated fourth acclamation as emperor.

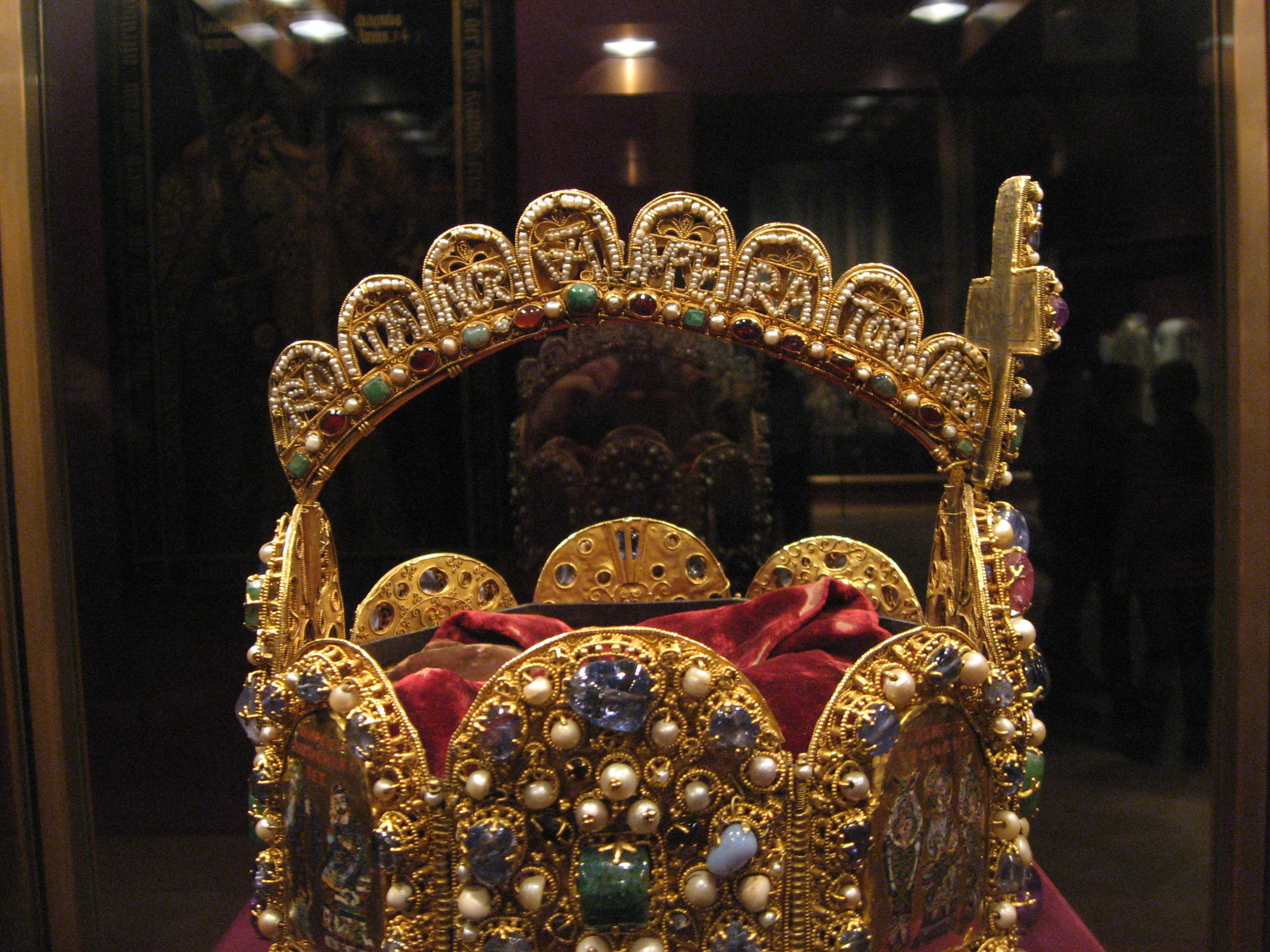
The Imperial Crown of the Holy Roman Empire with the inscription "ROMANORU[M] IMPERATOR AUG[USTUS]" (Emperor of the Romans, Augustus) on the right side of the arch

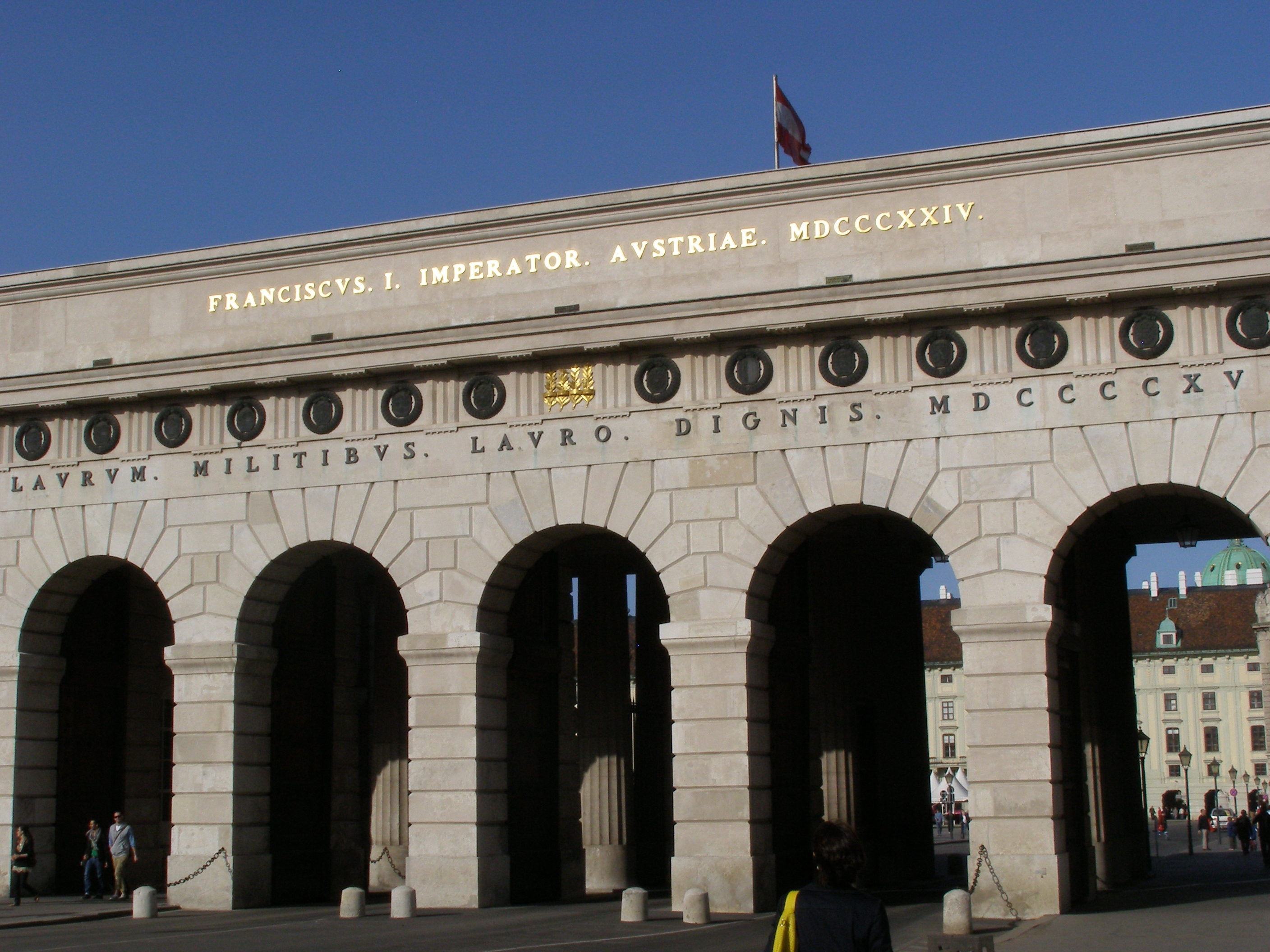
Golden dedication inscription at the Äusseres Burgtor of the Hofburg Palace in Vienna of "FRANCISCUS. I. IMPERATOR. AUSTRIAE. MDCCCXXIV." (Francis I, Emperor of Austria, 1824), who ruled as Francis II, last Holy Roman Emperor until 1806

== Imperatores in the ancient Roman Kingdom ==
When Rome was ruled by kings, to be able to rule, the king had to be invested with the full regal authority and power. So, after the comitia curiata that was held to elect the king, the king also had to be conferred the imperium.

== Imperatores in the Roman Republic ==
In Roman Republican literature and epigraphy, an imperator was a magistrate with imperium. During the later Roman Republic and during the late Republican civil wars, imperator mainly was the honorific title assumed by certain military commanders. After an especially great victory, an army's troops in the field would proclaim their commander imperator, an acclamation necessary for a general to apply to the Senate for a triumph. After being acclaimed imperator, the victorious general had a right to use the title after his name until the time of his triumph, where he would relinquish the title as well as his imperium. Since a triumph was the goal of many politically ambitious commanders, republican history is full of cases where legions were bribed to call their commander imperator.

=== List of Imperatores ===
Name	Office	Acclamation	Triumph	Ref
Lucius Aemilius Paullus	Proconsul of Hispania Ulterior	Lusitanian campaign (191–189 BC)	189 BC	
Lucius Julius Caesar	Consul	Battle of Acerrae (90 BC)	90 BC	
Lucius Cornelius Sulla I	Proconsul of Achaia and Asia	First Mithridatic War (87–85 BC)		
Lucius Cornelius Sulla II	Proconsul of Italia	Battle of the Colline Gate (82 BC)	81 BC	
Gnaeus Pompeius Magnus	Propraetor of Italia and Sicilia	Sulla's civil war (84 BC)	81 BC	
Quintus Caecilius Metellus Pius	Proconsul of Hispania Ulterior	Battle of Saguntum (75 BC)	71 BC	
Lucius Licinius Lucullus	Proconsul of Cilicia, Asia, Bithynia and Pontus	Third Mithridatic War (73–67 BC)	63 BC	
Gaius Julius Caesar I	Proconsul of Hispania Ulterior	Lusitanian campaign (62–60 BC)	waived in 60 BC	
Gaius Julius Caesar II	Proconsul of Gaul and Illyricum	Gallic Wars (58–50 BC)	46 BC	
Aulus Hirtius	Legate in Gaul	Gallic Wars (58–50 BC)		
Marcus Tullius Cicero	Proconsul of Cilicia (51–50 BC)		interrupted by Caesar's civil war	
Quintus Caecilius Metellus Pius Scipio	Proconsul of Syria (49 BC)		died in 46 BC	
Gnaeus Pompeius Magnus	Rebel in Hispania	c. 46 BC		
Gaius Julius Caesar III	Dictator and Roman consul	Battle of Munda (45 BC)	45 BC	
Lucius Munatius Plancus	Proconsul of Transalpine Gaul	Rhaetian campaign (44–43 BC)	43 BC	
Decimus Junius Brutus	Proconsul of Cisalpine Gaul (44–43 BC)		died 43 BC	
Marcus Junius Brutus	Proconsul of Macedonia, Achaia, Illyricum and Asia	Campaign against the Bessi (43 BC)	died 42 bc	
Gaius Cassius Longinus	Proconsul of Syria	Rhodian campaign (43 BC)	died 42 BC	
Marcus Antonius I	Triumvir	c. 43 BC		
Gaius Julius Caesar Octavianus I	Propraetor of Cisalpine Gaul	War of Mutina (44–43 BC)		
Marcus Aemilius Lepidus	Triumvir	c. 43 BC		
Sextus Pompeius II	Proconsul of Sicilia	Naval victory against Quintus Salvius Salvidienus Rufus (42 BC)		
Gnaeus Domitius Ahenobarbus	Rebel	Naval victory against Gnaeus Domitius Calvinus (42 BC)		
Quintus Labienus	General	Parthian invasion of 40 BC	died 39 BC	
Gaius Sosius	Proconsul of Syria	Siege of Jerusalem (37/6 BC)	34 BC	
Lucius Munatius Plancus II	Proconsul of Syria (36–32 BC)			
Nero Claudius Drusus	General on the Rhine	Battle of Arbalo (11 BC)	10 BC (Ovation)	
Tiberius Claudius Nero	General on the Rhine	German campaigns (8–7 BC)	7 BC	
Germanicus Julius Caesar	General on the Rhine	German campaigns (13–16 AD)	17 AD	
Junius Blaesus	Proconsul of Africa	Revolt of Tacfarinas (15-24 AD)		

== In the Roman Empire ==
Julius Caesar was the first to use the title of imperator permanently. Cassius Dio (2nd–3rd century AD) writes that the Roman senate recognized imperator as Caesar's hereditary title, but this is doubtful. In 38 BC, Marcus Vipsanius Agrippa refused a triumph for his victories under Octavian's ultimate command and established the convention whereby the princeps received the salutations and triumphs of his legates. After this, Octavian appears to have used imperator as a praenomen (Imperator Caesar, as opposed to Caesar Imperator), "perhaps intending to emphasize the personal and family value of the title." Imperator subsequently came to signify the supreme authority and was often used in this fashion. But Otho (r. 69 AD) was the first to officially imitate Augustus in using the title, and it was only under Vespasian (r. 69–79 AD) that Imperator ('emperor') became a "title by which the ruler was known." Sometimes relatives of the princeps who were "associated with him in power" were also given the title Imperator Caesar. After the death of a princeps or during a rebellion, the salutation of a general as imperator by an army meant that he was that army's candidate for the role of emperor.

The old practice of placing imperator after the name persisted after the term's adoption as a praenomen. After a victory, the emperor registered his salutation as imperator after his name. For example, Trajan was styled "Imp. Caesar…Traianus…imp. VI" after a sixth salutation as imperator for a victory. From the second half of the third century, the salutation of the emperor as imperator was deemed to occur every year, so the number of salutations became indistinguishable from the number of years of an emperor's reign.

== Use in eastern Rome and other post-Roman states ==
After the Roman empire collapsed in the West in the fifth century, Latin continued to be used as the official language of the Eastern Roman Empire. The Roman emperors of this period (historiographically referred to as Byzantine emperors) were referred to as imperatores in Latin texts, while the word basileus (king) and autokrator (emperor) were used in Greek.

Beginning in 1077, Alfonso VI of León and Castile instituted the use of the style ego Adefonsus imperator totius Hispaniae ("I, Alfonso, emperor of all Spain") and its use soon became regular. This title was used throughout the period 1079–1081, which represents the peak of his imperial pretensions before his capture of the city of Toledo, ancient capital of the Visigoths. In 1080, he introduced the form ego Adefonsus Hispaniarum imperator ("I, Alfonso, emperor of the Spains"), which he used again in 1090. His most elaborate imperial title was ego Adefonsus imperator totius Castelle et Toleto necnon et Nazare seu Alave ("I, Alfonso, emperor of all Castile and of Toledo also and of Nájera, or Álava").

After the Ottoman Empire conquered both the Balkan peninsula (Rumeli in Turkish meaning "lands of Rome") and Constantinople, the Turkish ruler claimed to have become the Caesar of Rome (sultan-ı iklim-i Rûm). In the fifteenth century Bayezid II established diplomatic relations with some Christian European states, and sent a document to the King of Poland in which he used the titles Sultan Dei gratia Asie, Grecie etc. Imperator Maximus ("with help of God, emperor of Asia and Greece"). Like his predecessor, Selim I titled himself imperator in diplomatic correspondence (per la Divina favente clementia Grande Imperator di Constantinopoli, di Asia, Europa, Persia, Syria et Egypto et Arabia et de li mari etc.) due to his military successes.

== Imperatrix ==
The feminine equivalent imperatrix was rarely used. Cicero used it ironically for Clodia in 56 BC, but it was not until the mid-5th century that an actual empress, Pulcheria Augusta, used the title.

== Derivatives ==
Imperator is the root for the word for emperor of most Romance languages. It is the root of the English word "emperor", which entered the language via the French empereur, while related adjectives such as "imperial" were imported into English directly from Latin.

== Bibliography ==
- Combès, Robert (1966). Imperator : Recherches sur l'emploi et la signification du titre d'Imperator dans la Rome républicaine. Paris: Presses universitaires de France; Publications de la Faculté des Lettres et Sciences humaines de l’Université de Montpellier. Archived from the original on 2010-12-30. 489 p.
- Rivero, Pilar (2006). Imperator Populi Romani: una aproximación al poder republicano. Zaragoza: Institución Fernando el Católico. 514 p. (Biblioteca virtual at http://ifc.dpz.es).
