= Office (disambiguation) =

An office is a room or other area in which people work, or a position within an organization with specific duties and rights attached.

Office or The Office may also refer to:

== Computer software ==
- Office suite, Bundled business productivity software
  - Ability Office
  - Collabora Online
  - ConceptDraw Office
  - Corel WordPerfect Office
  - Feng Office
  - LibreOffice
  - Microsoft Office
  - Mini Office II
  - Polaris Office
  - Siag Office
  - SoftMaker Office
  - Wang OFFICE
  - WPS Office
  - Zoho Office
- The Office (video game), a 2007 game based on the 2005 U.S. television series

== Film ==
- Office (2015 Hong Kong film), a musical comedy-drama film
- Office (2015 South Korean film), a thriller horror film
- The Office (film), a 1966 Polish short film

== Politics ==
- Political office, the authority to govern served by an elected official
- Public office, the authority to execute government policy

== Religion ==
- Daily Office, also called Liturgy of the Hours or Canonical hours, the recitation of certain prayers at fixed hours according to the discipline of some Christian denominations
- Holy Office, also called the Congregation for the Doctrine of the Faith in Roman Catholicism
- Private offices, prayers in the morning and evening, as described in Luther's Small Catechism

== Television ==
- Office (TV series), a 2013 Indian Tamil-language comedy series
- The Office (1995 TV series), an American comedy series starring Valerie Harper
- The Office, an international television franchise
  - The Office (British TV series), 2001–2003
  - The Office (American TV series), 2005–2013
  - The Office (Indian TV series), 2019
  - The Office (Australian TV series), 2024
  - Le Bureau, a French TV series, 2006
  - HaMisrad, an Israeli TV series, 2010–2013
  - La Job, a French Canadian TV series, 2006–2007
- Office Office, an Indian sitcom

== Other uses ==
- Office, Kendrick, American football player
- Office Holdings, which operates the "Office" chain of shoe shops in the UK and Ireland
- La Oficina (lit. The Office), a Chilean intelligence agency that existed in the 1990s
- Office (band), a Chicago-based rock band

== See also ==
- Officer (disambiguation)
- Official (disambiguation)
- Minister (Christianity), ordained offices in Christianity
