= Warrant =

Warrant may refer to:

- Warrant (law), a form of specific authorization
  - Arrest warrant, authorizing the arrest and detention of an individual
  - Search warrant, a court order issued that authorizes law enforcement to conduct a search for evidence
  - Execution warrant, a writ that authorizes the execution of a condemned person
- Warrant (philosophy), a proper justification for holding a belief
- Warrant (rhetoric), the assumption or principle that connects data to a claim
- Quo warranto, a writ requiring a person to show authority for exercising some right or power

== Arts, entertainment, and media ==
=== Music ===
- Warrant (American band), a glam metal band formed in 1984
- Warrant (German band), a speed metal band formed in 1983

=== Films ===
- Warrant (film), a 1975 Indian Hindi-language film directed by Pramod Chakravorty
- The Warrant, a 2020 American film directed by Brent Christy

== Business ==
- Dock warrant, a document certifying that the holder is entitled to goods at a maritime dock
- Track warrant, railroad line permission for a train's use of the main line
- Warrant of Fitness, New Zealand assurance certifying a motor vehicle
- Warrant sale, a statutory means of collecting debts in Scotland until 2001
- Warranty, a business transaction assurance
  - Warranty (disambiguation), various types of warranty

== Finance ==
- Warrant (finance), a right, without obligation, to buy or sell something at an agreed price
- Covered warrant, a warrant issued without an accompanying bond or equity
- Turbo warrant, a kind of stock option
- Warrant of payment, an order to an official to pay someone, similar to a check

== Government ==
- Warrant (town meeting), a document used to call and outline a town meeting
- Governor general's warrant, a non-budgeted payment instrument in Canadian law
- Warrant card, a proof of identification used by police officers
- Warrant of Appointment, President of Ireland official document of high office appointment
- Warrant officer (disambiguation), a rank in various military organizations
- Royal warrant (disambiguation), various documents issued by a monarch

== See also ==
- Warrant Officer 1 (disambiguation)
