= Warranty (disambiguation) =

A warranty is a guarantee or promise that specific facts or conditions are true or will happen.

Warranty may also refer to:

- Collateral warranty, gives a third party rights in an existing contract
- Extended warranty, a goods/service maintenance agreement
- Home warranty, home appliance service maintenance agreement
- Implied warranty, presumed assurances made in the sale of products or real property
- Industry Loss Warranties, insurance protection against an event to an entire insurance
- Warranty deed, real estate deed giving assurance of clear title and right to sell
- Warranty tolling, extending a product warranty period

== See also ==
- Warrant (disambiguation)
