= Battle of Zama (109 BC) =

Battle of the Jugurthine war;Numidian victory

- Part of Jugurthine War
Date	109 BC
Location	Zama, Tunisia
Result	Numidian victory

Belligerents
Kingdom of Numidia	Roman Republic

Commanders and leaders
Jugurtha	Quintus Caecilius Metellus; Caius Marius

Strength
Unknown	Unknown

Casualties and losses
Unknown	Heavy

The Battle of Zama or siege of Zama pitted the Roman legions under the command of Quintus Caecilius Metellus against Jugurtha's Numidian forces before the besieged city of Zama, which was held by the Roman army.

== Background ==
Fatigued by Jugurtha's continuous stratagems, which prevented a lasting confrontation, Marius resolves to besiege Zama. His intention is to compel Jugurtha to engage on open ground, forcing him to come to the aid of his besieged subjects, leading to a battle where escape would be impossible. Jugurtha, informed of the Roman general's plan by a spy, outmaneuvers Marius. Through forced marches, he dispatches auxiliary troops to reinforce Zama, organizing the resistance of the inhabitants. Among all the royal forces, these troops were the most trustworthy, given their inability to betray him.

Furthermore, Jugurtha promises the inhabitants that he will personally arrive at the head of an army when the time is right. With these arrangements in place, he withdraws to well-covered locations. Jugurtha nearly catches Marius off guard, who had been dispatched with a few cohorts to procure provisions in Sicca, a city Jugurtha had abandoned after his defeat. Under the cover of night, Jugurtha swiftly approaches the city walls with a select group of cavalry. As the Romans exit, he attacks them at the gates. Simultaneously, he raises his voice, urging the inhabitants and pledging independence and protection. The presence of their king reassures Jugurtha's soldiers.

== Battle ==
Upon Marius' arrival at Zama, and with Metellus having made all appropriate arrangements based on circumstances and locations, he completely invests the area with his army. Metellus instructs each of his lieutenants on the specific positions they are to attack and then gives the signal. Simultaneously, a loud cry resonates along the entire line. The Numidians await the assault, and the attack commences.

While the battles intensify beneath the walls of Zama, Jugurtha, leading a sizable force, unexpectedly attacks the Roman camp from the rear. Those in charge of its defense were negligent and unprepared for an assault. Jugurtha swiftly breaches the camp, causing panic among the Roman soldiers. Some flee, others grab their weapons; most fall either killed or wounded. According to Sallust, "only 40 soldiers, true to the honor of the Roman name, form a compact group and seize a small elevation, from which the most sustained efforts cannot dislodge them."

Metellus is at the height of his attacks when he hears Numidian cries behind him. Turning abruptly, he witnesses Roman fugitives heading in his direction. Immediately, he dispatches Marius toward the camp with all the cavalry and allied cohorts. According to Sallust, with tears in his eyes, he implores, in the name of their friendship and the republic, not to allow such an affront to be inflicted on a victorious army, nor for the enemy to withdraw unpunished. Marius carries out these orders. Jugurtha, entangled within the fortifications of the Roman camp, observing some of his cavalry leaping over the palisades and others squeezing through narrow passages, eventually withdraws to strong positions with considerable losses. Despite not achieving his objective, Metellus is compelled by nightfall to return to his camp with his army.

The next day, before venturing out to attack the stronghold, Metellus commands his entire cavalry to assemble in squadrons in front of the camp's section where Jugurtha had attacked the previous day. The guard of the gates and those of the posts closest to the enemy are distributed among the tribunes. Metellus then advances toward Zama and launches the assault. Similar to the day before, Jugurtha emerges from his ambush and charges at the Roman troops. The foremost soldiers momentarily allow fear and confusion to permeate their ranks, but comrades return to support them. The Numidians inflict devastating blows. Backed by this infantry, the Numidian cavalry, instead of charging and subsequently withdrawing as per their usual maneuver, gallops at full speed through the Roman ranks, breaking and penetrating them. The Romans suffer heavy losses.

== Aftermath ==
The battle concludes with a defeat for the Romans. Metellus places garrisons in the cities that had willingly submitted and withdraws with his troops into the Roman province of Africa.
