= BLG Logistics =

Multinational freight logistics company headquartered in Germany

BLG Logistics Group
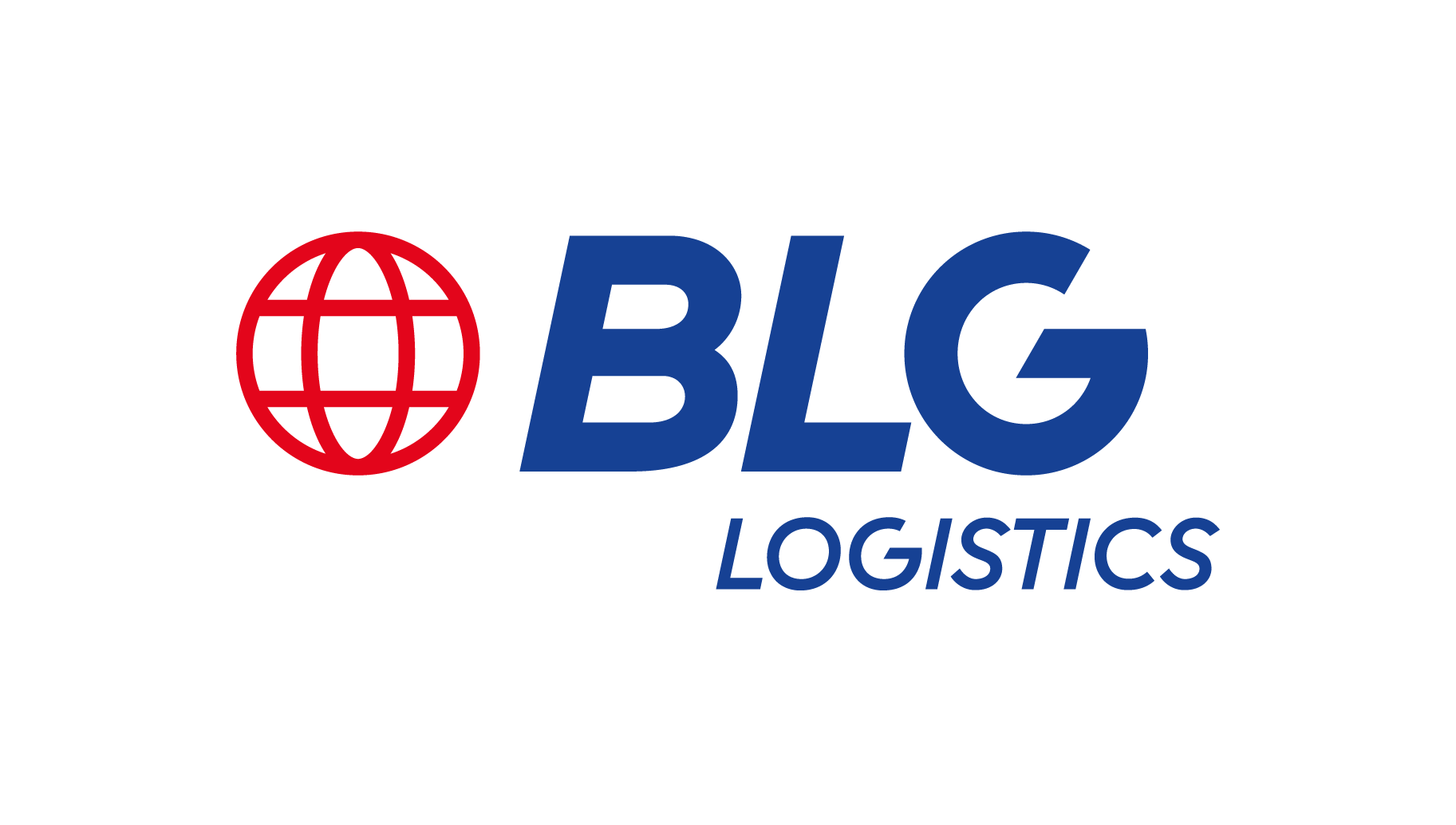

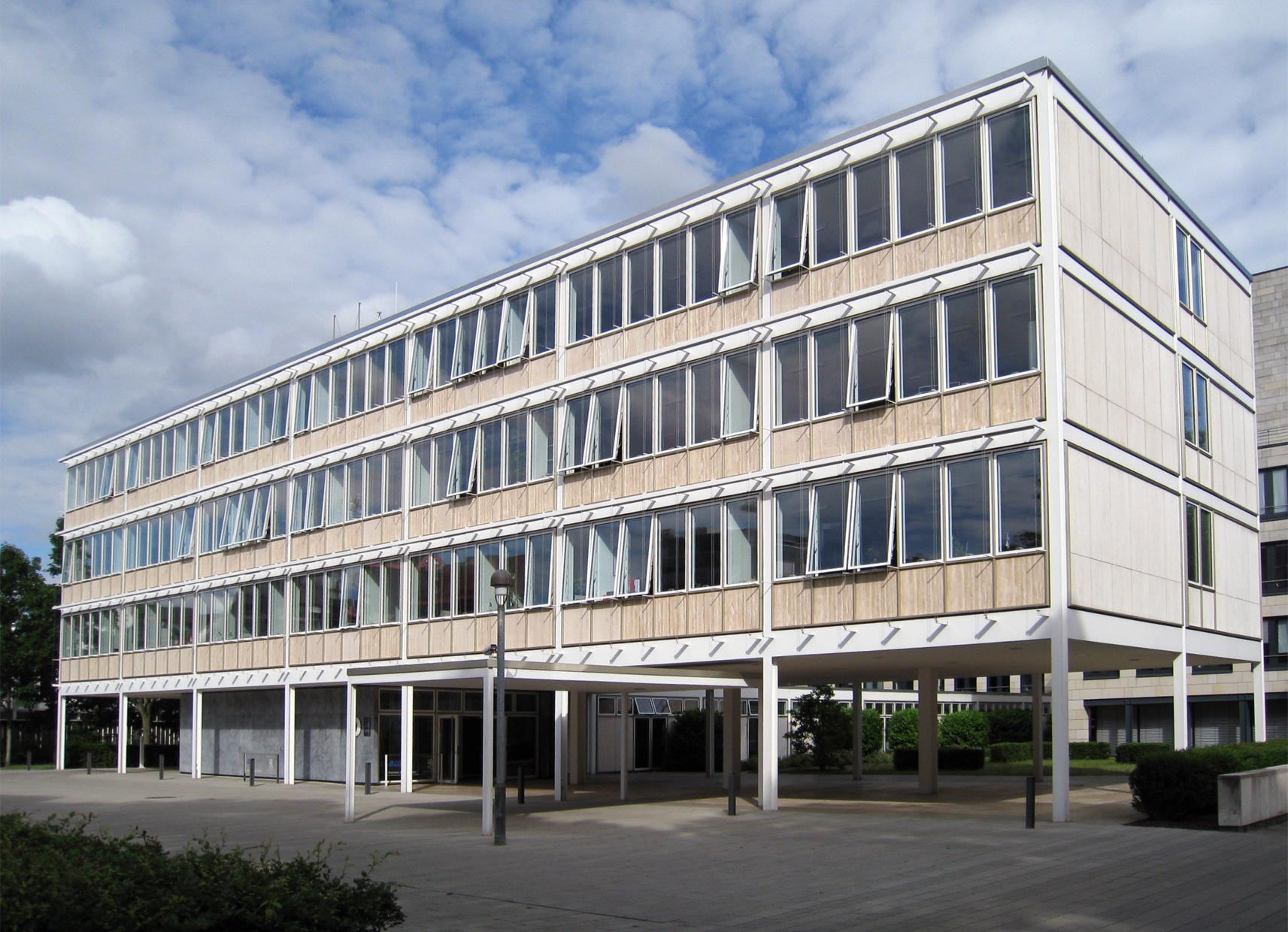
- Headquarters of BLG Logistics (photo from 2007)
- Trade name: BLG Logistics
- Type: Kommanditgesellschaft
- Traded as: BLH
- ISIN: DE0005261606
- Industry: Logistics
- Founded: 1877 in Bremen
- Headquarters: Bremen, Bremen, Germany
- Area served: Worldwide
- Key people: Matthias Magnor (Chairman of the Management Board and CEO); Klaus Meier (Chairman of the Supervisory Board)
- Revenue: ~ 1.2 billion EUR (2025)
- Number of employees: 10.452 (2025)
- Website: www.blg-logistics.com

BLG Logistics Group AG & Co. KG is a seaport and logistics company with headquarters in Bremen (Germany). The operative divisions offer services for automobile, industry and trading customers. The company has nearly 100 locations in Europe, America, Asia and Africa.

== History ==
=== 1877 to 1933 ===
65 merchants founded Bremer Lagerhaus-Gesellschaft -Aktiengesellschaft von 1877- (BLG) in February 1877. A key factor in the company's creation was the desire of Bremen cotton traders to obtain an improved warehousing and trading infrastructure, including the option of issuing warehouse receipts and warrants. The business was restricted to handling and storage; it did not include the transport of goods. The company's own initial five warehouses went into operation in 1878 on the left bank of the Weser in the Sicherheitshafen – referred to since approx. 1900 by locals as Hohentorshafen. BLG itself provided for the early connection to the railway line. In the first decade of operation, the company stored mainly grain and legumes, lard, bacon and pork, tobacco, cotton, sheep's wool and coffee.

In 1888, BLG expanded its operations to the Europahafen (Free Port I) on the right bank of the Weser, which following Bremen's accession to the Customs Union (October 1888) was conceived as a free port; the relevant operating agreement between Bremen and BLG dates back to May 1888. BLG played a seminal role in the development of port facilities on the right bank of the Weser up until World War I. With its completion in 1906, the company also became active in the Free Port II, the operating agreement was amended for this purpose. Moreover, from 1897, the company ran the Getreideverkehrsanlage (grain transport system) and in 1929, it took over the Weser Railway Station. As a reaction to the ramifications of the Great Depression, BLG introduced the so-called "Krümpersystem" in the beginning of April 1932, intended to prevent unemployment through staggered furloughing of workers. The system remained in force until the end of April 1935.

=== 1933 to 1945 ===
During the course of the seizure of power by National Socialists in Bremen, the long-standing Chairman of the management board Kurt Dronke, a member of the German State Party group in the State Parliament of Bremen, was forced out of office in April 1933. His successor was an NSDAP member. A similar fate befell Carl Krüger, who had been a member of the management board since 1931: Under political pressure, he requested a six-month leave of absence in September 1933, and on May 31, 1934, he retired. Based on National Socialist legislation, also in Bremen all temporary workers of the port were hired in an overall port operating company (in Bremen since June 25, 1934: Hafenbetriebsverein in Bremen e.V., a port operating association). This association assigned workers to the port operators, also to BLG. After the beginning of World War II, these laborers also included foreign workers, prisoners of war, slave laborers from Central and Eastern Europe, and occasionally also prisoners and concentration camp inmates.

In early January 1941, a fire set off by incendiary bombs ravaged the administrative offices of BLG. Explosive and incendiary bombs destroyed a large part of the port and its facilities by the end of the war (warehouses, silos, enclosures, cranes, hydraulic equipment, rails, lines, grain facilities, Weser Railway Station etc.).

=== 1945 to 1998 ===
The authorities in the American Zone of Occupation dismissed ten executive employees of BLG on September 17, 1945. The company obtained a renewal of its operating permit on November 29, 1945. As repairs to the port progressed, the activities of BLG were revitalized. Initially, the business was focused mainly on the Überseehafen, then repairs began on the Europahafen. In 1951, the Weser Railway Station resumed operations. In the first half of the 1950s, operations also began in the cold storage warehouse at the Holz- und Fabrikenhafen.

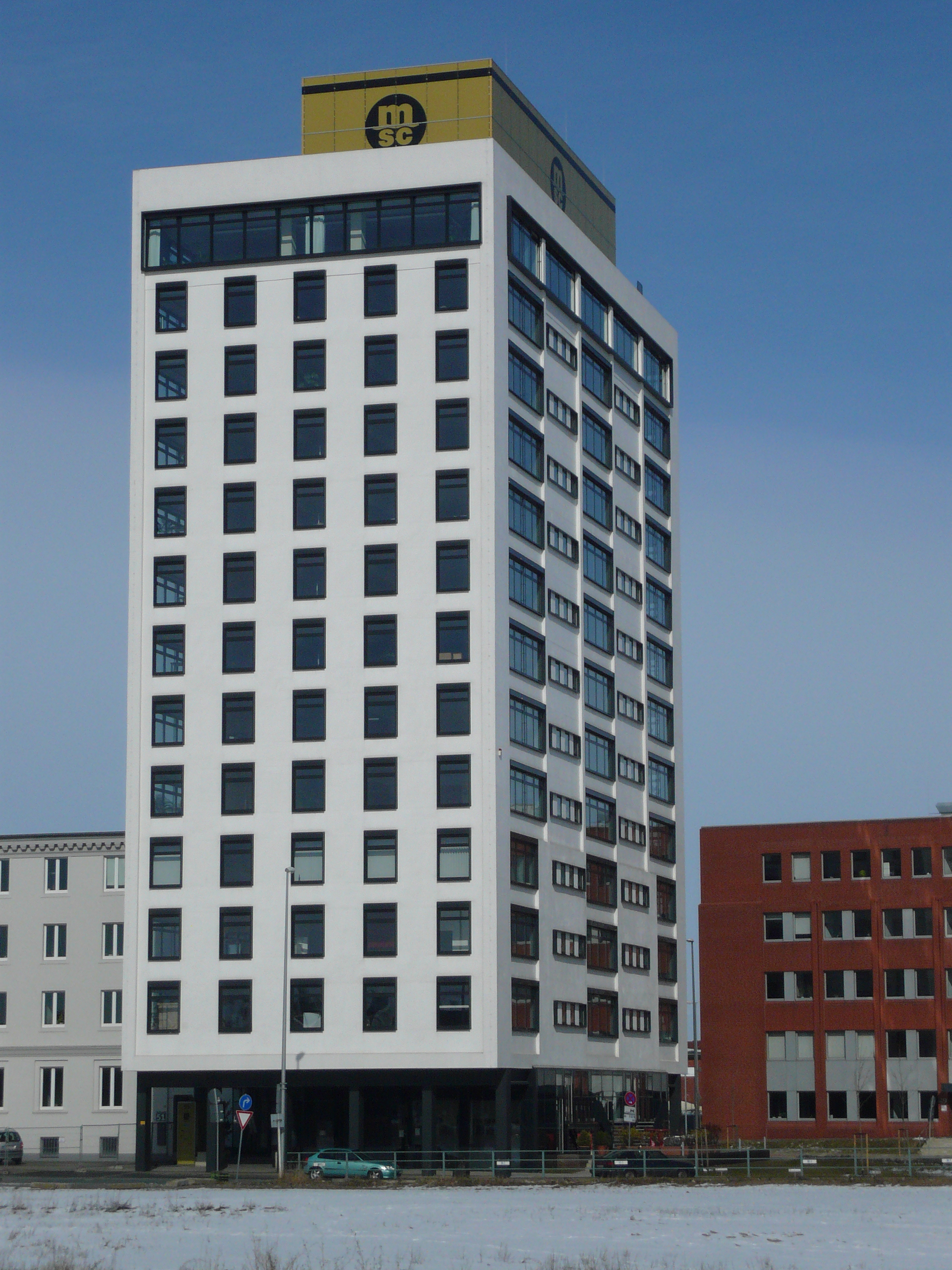
Port high-rise structure (photo from 2010)

From mid-1953, BLG was also directing operations in the Ports of Bremerhaven. This involved the Kaiserhafen, Columbuskaje, the Neuer Hafen and the Verbindungshafen. The Nordhafen was added later. In 1959, the municipality of Bremen and BLG concluded an operating agreement, which provided that the city maintain the majority of shares. In 1961, the company moved into the newly built port high-rise structure at the head of the Überseehafen. Two years later, the City of Bremen and BLG signed a contractual agreement that allowed the company to assume third-party loans in the capital market for additional projects. This is how it financed the significant expenditures for the building and operation of the Neustädter Hafen (operating from 1965/1966) as well as for the building and operation of the container terminals in Bremerhaven (construction from 1968; operation from 1971). Already in 1966, the first container vessel appeared in Europe, the Fairland, and called on the Überseehafen. Since 1967, there was a temporary facility for RoRo vessels in this port; at the end of 1973, there was one available on a permanent basis in the Europahafen.

From 1970 on, Bremerhaven was regularly frequented by LASH mother ships. From February 1974, a floating barge moorage was located at the head of the Überseehafen. In 1979, BLG took over the Cape Horn handling facility from Anker Schiffahrtsgesellschaft with access to the Weser as well as to the Industriehafen. In the same year, the RoRo facility in the Neustädter Hafen was ready for operation.

BLG participated in the booming container business in the 1980s, which completely reshaped the port economy and in Bremerhaven, in particular, led to the expansion of the terminals in several phases.

The stiff competition put downward pressure on the margins at BLG. The recession of the world economy at the beginning of the 1980s led to layoffs of BLG employees in the industrial and commercial sector. Through business contacts to Volkswagen and later to Daimler-Benz, the company began with logistics services for the automobile industry and in doing so, improved its value added, initially per dispersion of supplier material to German factories, then per Semi Knocked Down and Completely Knocked Down. BLG also took over logistical services with improved value added since 1980 for Minolta.

The fall of the socialist regimes in Central and Eastern Europe at the end of the 1980s/beginning of the 1990s meant significant cargo losses for BLG in the conventional business. The company experienced a crisis.

=== Since 1998 ===
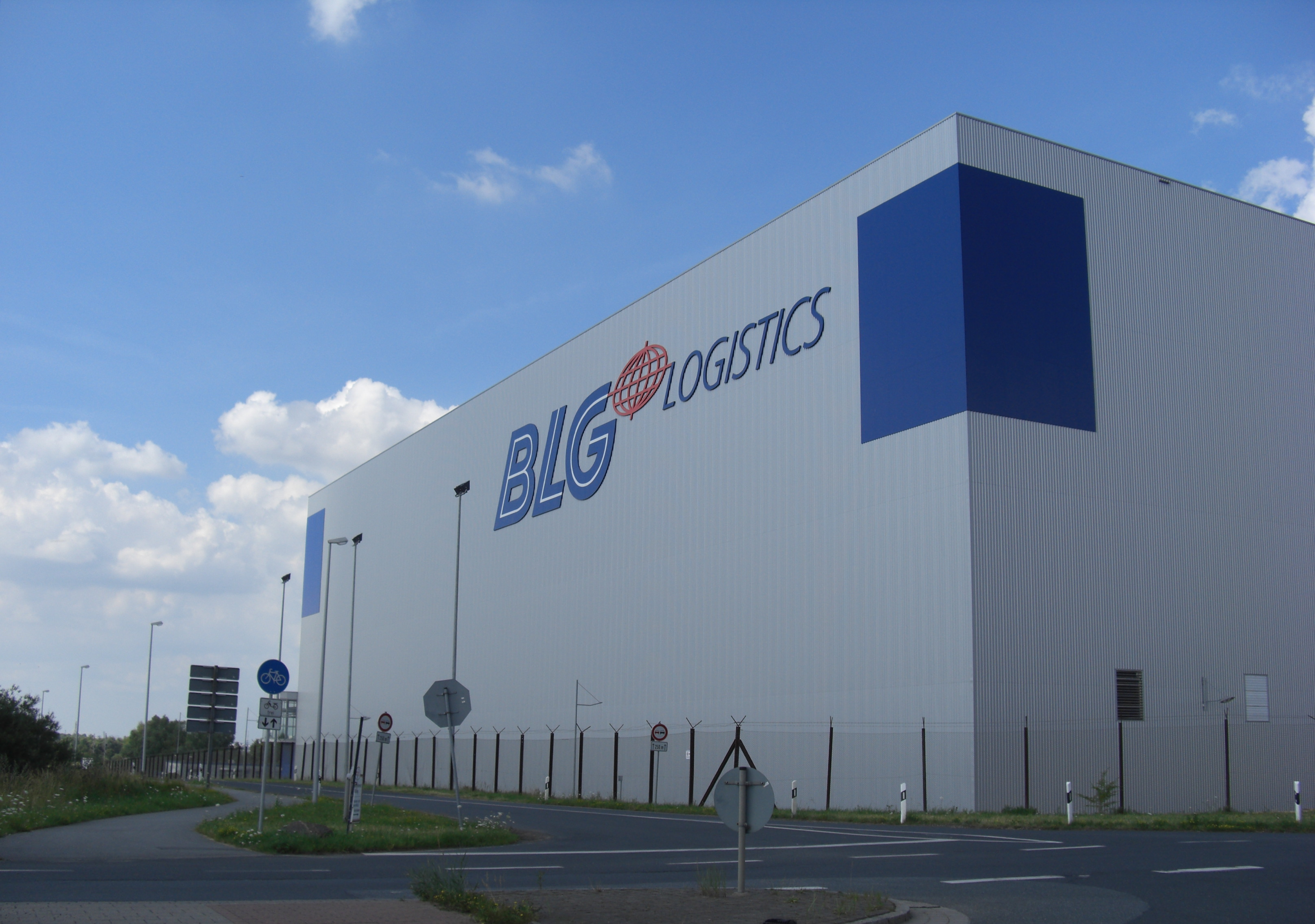
High-bay warehouse of BLG Logistics at the Neustädter Hafen in Bremen

At the beginning of the 1990s, the objective was to develop from a local port company into an international logistics group, according to Detthold Aden, who as Chairman of the Management Board promoted this change from 1999 to 2013. Already in 1998, the organizational structure was revamped: The BLG Group was created with Bremer Lagerhaus-Gesellschaft -Aktiengesellschaft von 1877- as the general partner and the new BLG Logistics Group AG & Co. KG as the limited partner. As a holding company, the KG focused on the strategic orientation and growth of the Group. Since that time, several branch subsidiaries and affiliates have operated under the Group umbrella in corporate independence. They fall under the three operative divisions: automobile, contract and container.

In 1999, the container business was merged with Hamburg's Eurokai into Eurogate. Today, this joint venture operates container terminals on the North Sea, on the Atlantic, and in the Mediterranean Sea.

In 2002, BLG Logistics took over the contract logistics of Paul Günther Logistik AG (Hamburg) and thus gained logistics locations in eastern Germany. Furthermore, it acquired 50 percent of the shares in the vehicle forwarding company E.H. Harms Automobile Logistics operating in Bremen and Bremerhaven. In 2009, the company increased its share to 94 percent. In the year 2002, the headquarters of BLG Logistics moved into a building next to the former American Consular Agency, and since 2006, also into this historic building.

In 2003, the high-bay warehouse went into operation at Bremen's Güterverkehrszentrum (cargo transport center).

In 2008 the company acquired half the shares in CTL Car Transport Logistics GmbH. This company changed its name and became BLG AutoRail GmbH. Up to 2017, it expanded its rail vehicle carriers to some 1500 units.

The contract division began in 2015 with the establishment of the Fashion logistics division. In 2016, the company acquired Fortagroup, followed in 2017 by the purchase of Kitzinger & Co. and its subsidiary Arno Rosenlöcher. In 2021, the company sold its forwarding activities in the sea and air freight business, which were organized in BLG International Forwarding, to Rhenus. Air & See; the BLG forwarding location in Bremen war not part of that deal. 2022, a joint venture with Hyundai Glovis was launched in Bremerhaven. Since the end of 2022, the company has been a partner of the United Nations World Food Programme to provide logistical expertise in emergencies. In 2023, a permanent car train connection from Kelheim to Köseköy on the Sea of Marmara in Turkey was launched. In early 2025, Matthias Magnor took over the position of CEO from Frank Dreeke. In 2025, the company also agreed on a strategic partnership with the major Chinese shipping company COSCO, which relates to BLG's terminal in Bremerhaven. In December 2025, the company opened another domestic terminal for cars at Ahlhorn Airport.

== Structures and shareholders ==
=== Structures ===
The BLG Group consists of Bremer Lagerhaus-Gesellschaft -Aktiengesellschaft von 1877- as general partner and BLG Logistics Group AG & Co. KG as limited partner. The Municipality of Bremen owns 100 percent of the KG. It owns a majority (50.4 percent) in Bremer Lagerhaus-Gesellschaft -Aktiengesellschaft von 1877-. Several branch subsidiaries and affiliates have operated under the Group umbrella in corporate independence. They fall under the three operative divisions Automobile, Contract and Container. The company has almost 100 locations in seven countries (as of September 2026): Germany, China, Poland, Slovenia, South Africa, Ukraine and the United States.

=== Shareholders ===
The shares of the publicly listed Bremer Lagerhaus-Gesellschaft -Aktiengesellschaft von 1877- are divided up between:

- Freie Hansestadt Bremen, Municipality
- Financial holding of the Sparkasse in Bremen (Sparkasse savings bank in Bremen)
- Waldemar Koch Stiftung foundation
- Panta Re AG
- Free float

== Additional information ==
=== Buildings at headquarters ===
The company headquarters has been in a building complex in the center of Bremen since 2002. This includes the building of the former Consular Agency of the United States on Präsident-Kennedy-Platz in the Bremen district of Mitte. It was built in 1954 in the so-called post-war modern international style according to blueprints from Skidmore, Owings & Merrill, in collaboration with Otto Apel. It has been under historic preservation since 1994. From 2005 to 2007, it was refurbished for use by BLG Logistics.

=== Bremer Unternehmergespräche event ===
Detthold Aden, the long-standing BLG Chairman of the Management Board launched the Bremer Unternehmensgespräche, a round table for business. The event regularly occurs in the Bremen City Hall and is hosted by BLG Logistics, along with the Senator of Economics, Labor and Europe and the Bremen Chamber of Commerce.

=== Sponsorships ===
Since 2005/2006, the company supports the professional basketball club Eisbären Bremerhaven. Since 2010, the company is also a sponsor of the football club SV Werder Bremen.
