= Jugurtha =

2nd-century BC King of Numidia

Jugurtha Yugerṯen
- King of Numidia
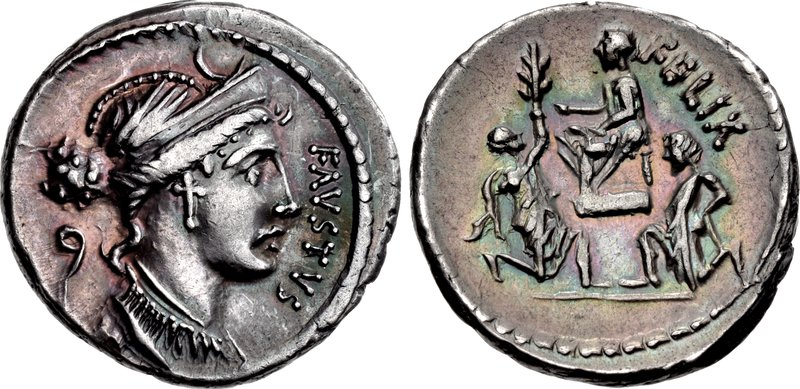
- Captured Jugurtha on a coin of Faustus Cornelius Sulla, on the left can be seen Bocchus I kneeling in front of Sulla. (Note: Acccording to numismatists, the coins usually attributed to Jugurtha were minted a century before him by Carthage and represent the god Triptolemus. Jugurtha apparently didn't have access to the mint of Cirta and the mint of Siga isn't known to have minted any coins during his reign, those being the only two mints of the kingdom, Jugurtha minting coin is unlikely.)

King of Numidia
- Reign: 118–105 BC
- Predecessor: Micipsa
- Successor: Gauda
- Co-ruler: Hiempsal I; Adherbal
- Rival: Massiva II (111–110 BC)
- Born: c. 160 BC; Cirta (Constantine)
- Died: 104 BC (aged about 56); Tullianum Prison, Rome
- Spouse: Daughter of Bocchus
- Issue: Oxyntas; Iampsas
- Berber: ⵢⵓⴳⵔⵜⵏ (Yugerten)
- Tribe: Massylii
- Father: Mastanabal; Micipsa (adoptive)
- Military career
- Conflicts: Numantine War; Siege of Numantia; Jugurthine War; Siege of Cirta; Battle of Suthul; Siege of Zama; Battle of Zama (109 BC); Battle of the Muthul river; Siege of Thala; Second Battle of Cirta; Battle of Cirta (105 BC)

Jugurtha or Jugurthen (/dʒəˈɡɜːrθə, dʒuˈɡɜːrθə/ c. 160 – 104 BC) was a king of Numidia, the ancient kingdom of the Numidians in northwest Africa. When the Numidian king Micipsa, who had adopted Jugurtha, died in 118 BC, Micipsa's two sons, Hiempsal and Adherbal, along with Jugurtha, were in line for succession. Jugurtha arranged to have Hiempsal killed in 117 BC and, after a civil war, defeated and killed Adherbal in 112 BC.

The death of Adherbal, which was against the wishes of Rome, along with the growing popular anger in Rome at Jugurtha's success in bribing Roman senators and thus avoiding retribution, led to the Jugurthine War between Rome and Numidia. After a number of battles in Numidia between Roman and Numidian forces, Jugurtha was captured in 105 BC and paraded through Rome as part of Gaius Marius' Roman triumph. He was thrown into the Tullianum prison, where he was executed by strangulation in 104 BC.

== Etymology ==
The Numidian name Jugurtha matches the ancient naming traditions of Berber peoples and is likely analyzable as the Libyco-Berber word yugurtən “he exceeded them” connected to the stem agər/ugər “to exceed” in modern Berber languages.

== Background ==
Numidia was a region of North Africa roughly within the boundaries of what is now eastern Algeria, parts of western Tunisia and Western Libya. Indigenous inhabitants of Numidia remained semi-nomadic, often identified as Berbers, until Masinissa, chief of the Massyli tribe based near Cirta, who supported Rome during the Second Punic War (206 BC) against the nearby Punics of Carthage, used the support of Rome to establish a kingdom. To do so, Masinissa defeated the rival chief Syphax with the help of famed Roman general Scipio Africanus in 203 BC. Numidian horsemanship and cavalry tactics, as asserted by Polybius, contributed greatly to the development of cavalry tactics in the Roman army which helped them to victory in the Second Punic War. His alliance with Rome began to fray in the mid-second century BC among Roman fears of Masinissa's ambitions and of Carthage's resurgence on the part of Cato the Elder.

Masinissa died before any actual breach in the treaty in early 148 BC, but the suspicion of Numidia lasted in Rome to affect Jugurtha. Masinissa was succeeded by his son Micipsa. Jugurtha, Micipsa's adopted son (Mastanabal's illegitimate son and thusly Masinissa's illegitimate grandson), was so popular among the Numidians that Micipsa sent him away to Hispania to assist a campaign of Scipio Aemilianus in a poetic parallel to Masinissa's alliance with Scipio Africanus as an attempt to mitigate his influence.

Unfortunately for Micipsa, this only served Jugurtha, who used his time in Spain to make several influential Roman contacts. Under Scipio Aemilianus at the siege of Numantia (134–133 BC), serving alongside Gaius Marius, Jugurtha learned of Romans' weakness for bribes and that powerful friends in Rome can go a long way. He famously described Rome as "urbem venalem et mature perituram, si emptorem invenerit" ("a city for sale and doomed to quick destruction, if it should find a buyer," Sallust, Jug. 35.10).

== Rise to power ==
When Micipsa died in 118 BC, he was succeeded jointly by Jugurtha and his two sons (Jugurtha's adoptive-brothers) Hiempsal and Adherbal. Hiempsal and Jugurtha quarrelled immediately after the death of Micipsa. Jugurtha had Hiempsal killed, which led to open war with Adherbal. After Jugurtha defeated him in open battle, Adherbal fled to Rome for help. The Roman officials settled the fight by dividing Numidia into two parts, probably in 116, but this settlement was tainted by accusations that the Roman officials accepted bribes to favor Jugurtha. Among the officials found guilty was Lucius Opimius (who, as consul in 121 BC, had presided over events which led to the death of Gaius Gracchus). Jugurtha was assigned the western half; later Roman propaganda claimed that this half was also richer, but in truth it was both less populated and less developed.

== War with Rome ==
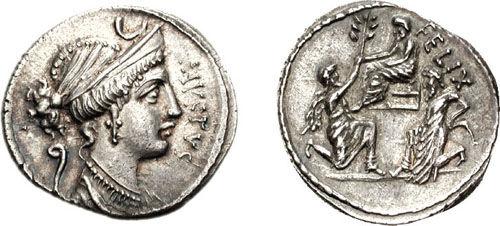
Denarius coin, Obverse: Diana, legend FAVSTVS. Reverse: Sulla seated left on a raised seat; before him kneels Bocchus, offering an olive-branch; behind, Jugurtha kneeling left, legend FELIX. 56 BC.

By 112 BC Jugurtha resumed his war with Adherbal, penning the latter up in his capital of Cirta. Adherbal was encouraged to hold out by a corps of Roman residents, in expectation of military aid arriving from Rome. However, Roman troops were engaged in the Cimbrian War and the Senate merely sent two successive embassies to remonstrate with Jugurtha who delayed until he had captured Cirta. His troops then massacred many residents including the Romans. This brought Jugurtha into direct conflict with Rome, which sent troops under the Consul Lucius Calpurnius Bestia. Although the Romans made significant inroads into Numidia, their heavy infantry was unable to inflict any significant casualties on Jugurtha's army which included large numbers of light cavalry.

Immediately following the sack of Cirta, Bestia accepted an offer of negotiations from Jugurtha, a highly favourable peace treaty which raised suspicions of bribery once more. The local Roman commander was summoned to Rome to face corruption charges brought by his political rival and tribune-elect Gaius Memmius, who also induced the tribal assembly to vote safe conduct to Jugurtha to come to Rome to give evidence against the officials suspected of succumbing to bribery. However once Jugurtha had reached Rome, another tribune used his veto to prevent evidence being given. Jugurtha also severely damaged his reputation and weakened his position by using his time in Rome to set gangs onto a cousin, named Massiva, a potential rival for the Numidian throne. The public opinion of Roman citizens and elites, among the most powerful political forces in Republican Rome, turned against him and Jugurtha was once again at war with the Republic.

War again broke out between Numidia and the Roman Republic, and several legions were dispatched to North Africa under the command of the consul, Quintus Caecilius Metellus Numidicus. The war dragged out into a long and seemingly endless campaign, as the Romans tried to inflict a decisive defeat on Jugurtha. A series of incompetent generals of Rome began this renewed war; in 110 BC Jugurtha forced capitulation of an entire army being led by Aulus Postumius Albinus and drove the Romans out of Numidia entirely. Metellus won several battles against Jugurtha in 109 BC but failed to spur Jugurtha to surrender. Frustrated at the stagnation and likely facing political pressure from Rome, Metellus's lieutenant, Gaius Marius, returned to Rome to seek election as consul in 107 BC. After winning the election, Marius returned to Numidia to take control of the war which Jugurtha was prolonging through successful guerrilla warfare.

Jugurtha was allied with his western neighbor Mauretania by marriage, Bocchus I of Mauretania both his ally and father-in-law, an age-old diplomatic move. At the outset of the major war (112–105 BC), Bocchus stood out of the way of the issue, eventually joining Jugurtha in the fighting against Marius in 107 BC. This was short-lived support, though, as in 105 BC Marius sent his quaestor, Sulla, to Mauretania in order to weaken Jugurtha. Bocchus agreed to betray Jugurtha and hand him over to Sulla in exchange for extension of his lands into western Numidia to the Mulucha River. This brought the war to a close; Jugurtha was brought to Rome in chains and was paraded through the streets as Gaius Marius' Roman triumph after which his royal robes were removed and his earrings were ripped off. He lost an ear lobe in the process. He was then thrown into the Tullianum, where he was either starved to death or (more likely) executed by strangulation in 104 BC. He was survived by his son, Oxyntas.

== Literary references ==
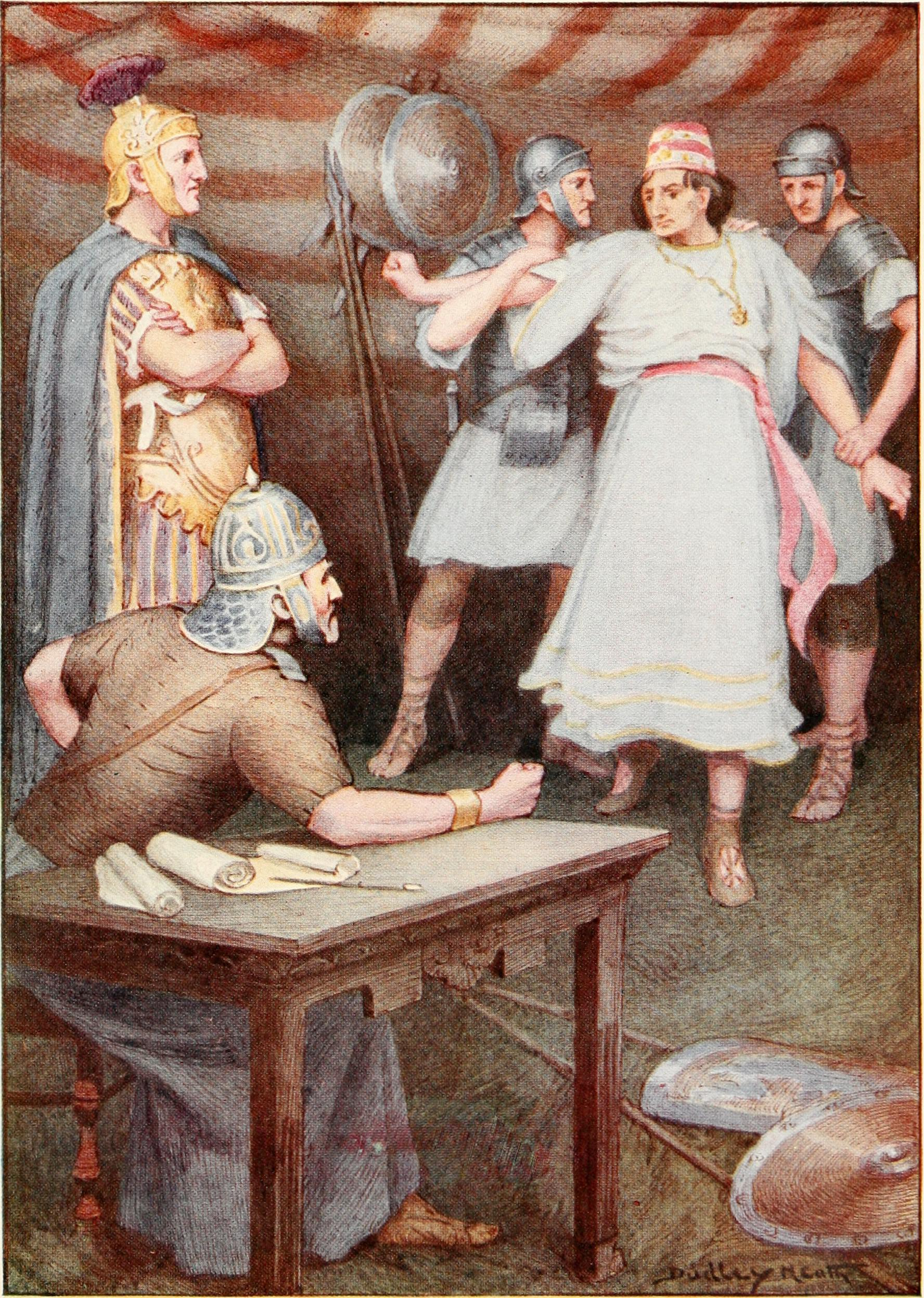
Jughurta's betrayal and capture by Bocchus I (c. 108 BC)

Jugurtha features in one of Arthur Rimbaud's earliest surviving poems. Rimbaud was a French poet living in the mid- to late nineteenth century, his father a captain in the French army. The poem is a Latin ode to the Numidian king, contextualized to Rimbaud's modern context by having the ghost of Jugurtha, à la Hamlet, appear to a baby Abdelkader al-Jazairi (who is unnamed in the poem) a hero of the Algerian struggle for independence against France. The poem opens:

A prodigious child was born in the Arabian hills
And a light breeze said: "He is Jugurtha's heir."
A few days had passed when there arose from the infant
Who would be the Jugurtha of the Arab people and nation,
Above the child, astonishing his parents,
The shade of Jugurtha himself,
Telling the story of his life and making a prediction:

== See also ==
- Battle of the Muthul
- Bomilcar (2nd century BC)
- Jugurtha Tableland
- Jugurthine War
- Sallust, De Bello Iugurthino
- Tacfarinas
