= Royal warrant =

A royal warrant is a document issued by a monarch which confers rights or privileges on the recipient, or has the effect of law.

Royal warrant may refer to:

- Royal warrant of appointment, warrant to tradespeople who supply goods or services to a royal court
  - Royal warrant of appointment (Spain), issued to those who supplied goods or services to the King of Spain
  - Royal warrant of appointment (Thailand), issued to companies and businesses that have shown exceptional services
  - Royal warrant of appointment (United Kingdom), granted by senior members of the British royal family
    - List of royal warrant holders of the British royal family
  - List of royal warrant holders of the Swedish court, granted by the royal family of Sweden
- Royal warrant of precedence, a warrant issued by a monarch of to determine precedence amongst individuals or organisations
- Royal charter, a formal document issued by a monarch to establish an organization
- Warrant (law), a specific type of authorization
  - Warrant officer, an officer in a military organisation designated an officer by a warrant

== See also ==
- Letters patent, a type of legal instrument granting rights or privileges
- Royal commission, a major ad-hoc formal public inquiry into a defined issue in some monarchies, often established by royal warrant
- Royal sign-manual, a monarch's signature which confirms an order, commission, or warrant
- Warrant of appointment, the official document presented by the President of Ireland to persons upon appointment to certain high offices of state
- Warrant (disambiguation)
