= Jugurtha Tableland =

Mountain in Tunisia

Coordinates: 35.7427°N 8.3821°E

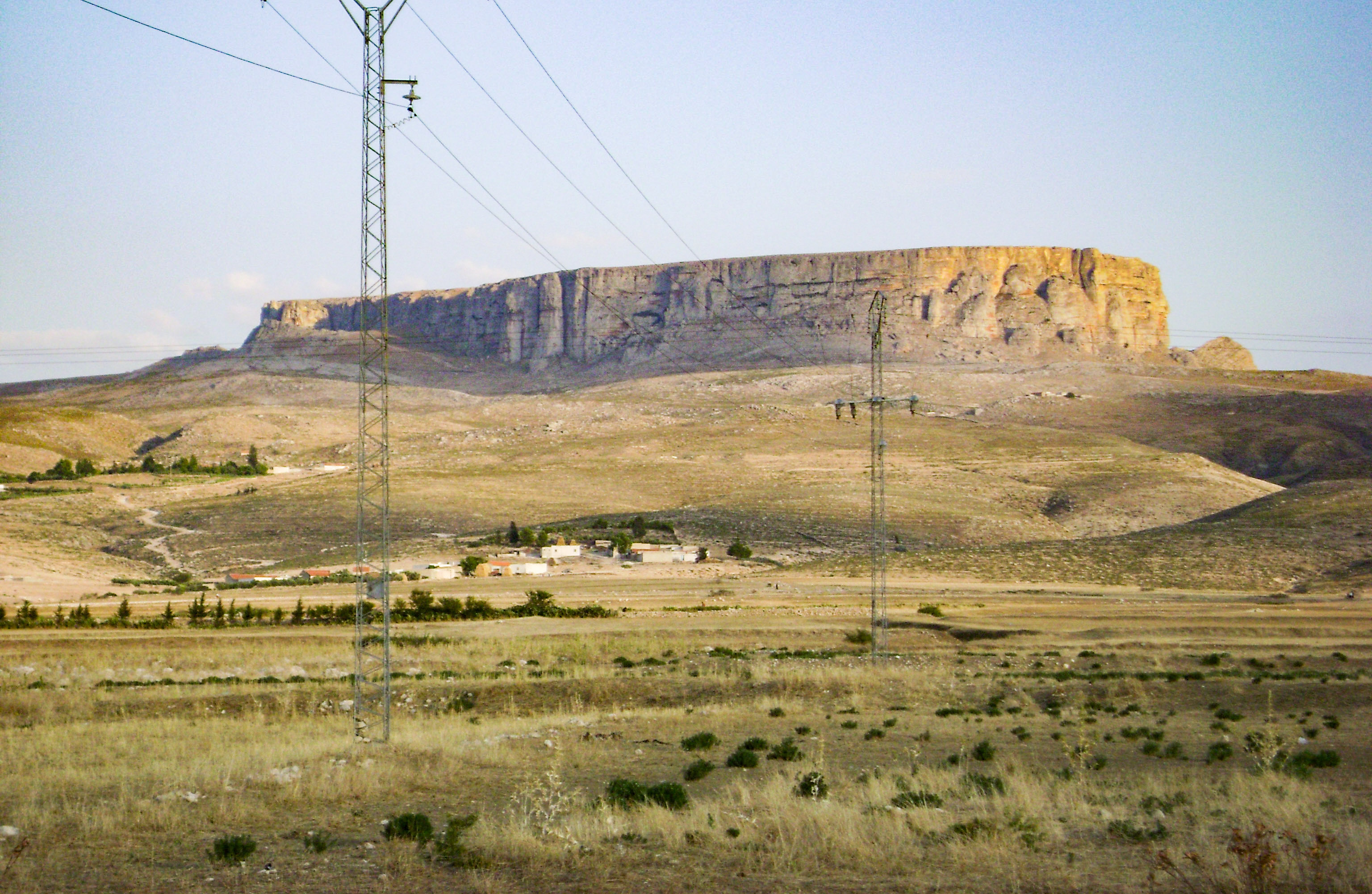
Jugurtha Tableland

The Jugurtha Tableland is a large mesa near the town of Kalaat es Senan, Tunisia, which stands almost 600 metres (2,000 ft) above the Ez-Zghalma plain. 1,500 m (4,900 ft) long and 500 m (1,600 ft) wide, it covers a total area of nearly 80 hectares.

The Tableland is a geologic feature known as an inverted relief. Millions of years ago, the hard limestone top of the mesa was actually the bottom of a valley. Over the years, the softer surrounding hills were worn away by erosion, leaving the Tableland – and former low point – as the highest point on a plain. Local drinking water comes from the Ain Senan spring at the edge of the Jugurtha Tableland.

== History ==
The mesa has been used as a fortified site several times in history, as its height provides a clear vantage point for defenders, and the sheer rock walls make ascent difficult for attackers.

Legend holds that Masinissa, the first king of Numidia, built the first fortress there around 200 B.C.

Around 112 to 105 B.C., King Jugurtha of Numidia used the mesa to hold off the Roman legions in his long war with them. The highest cliffs of the mesa still show signs of the steps his soldiers chiseled into the sheer rock to reach the top.

In the 18th century, the fortress was reconstructed by a local leader Senan, a rebel whose long resistance to the troops of the Bey of Tunis gave the town and area its name.

== Gallery ==
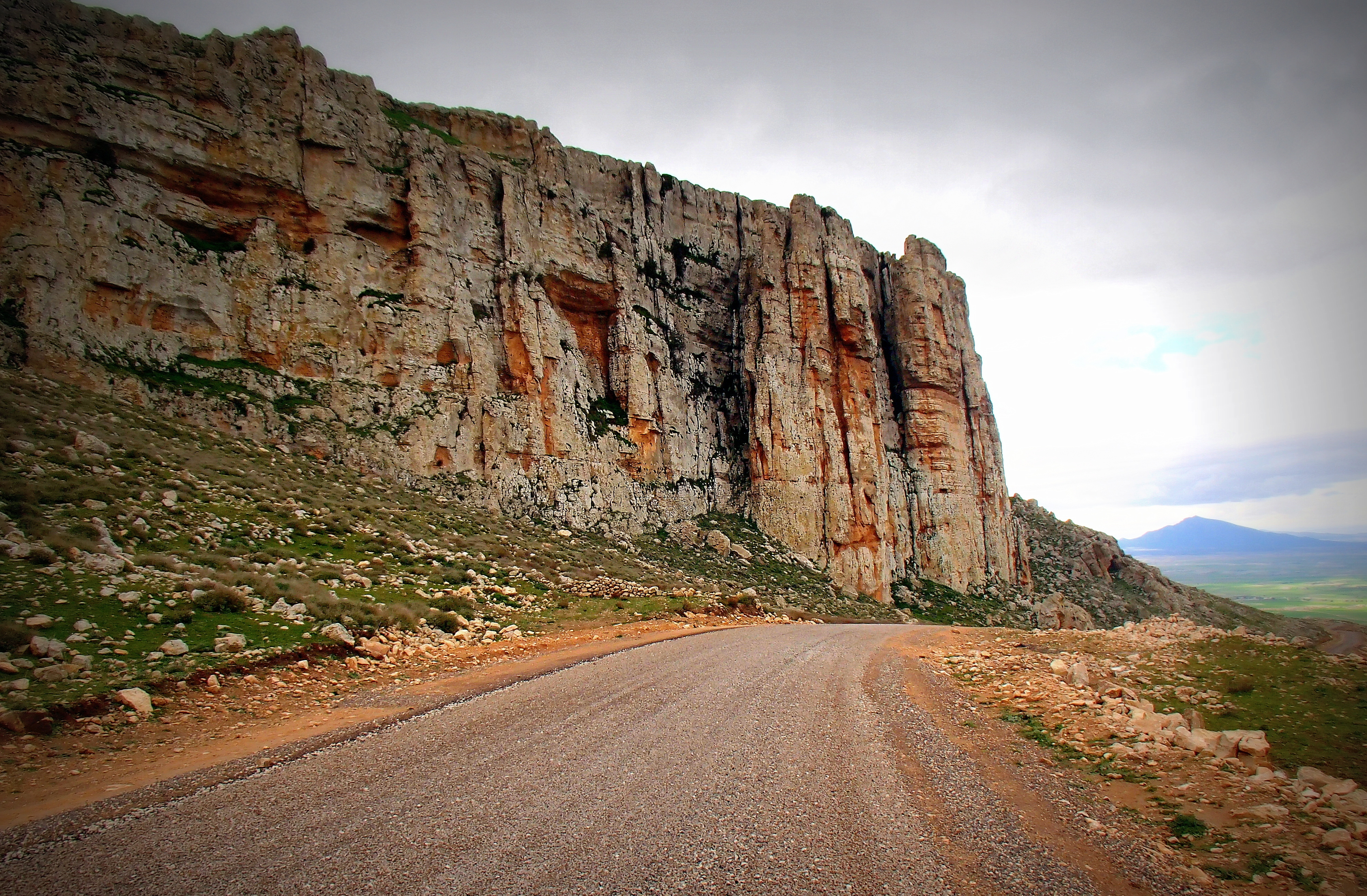
Jugurtha Tableland from side

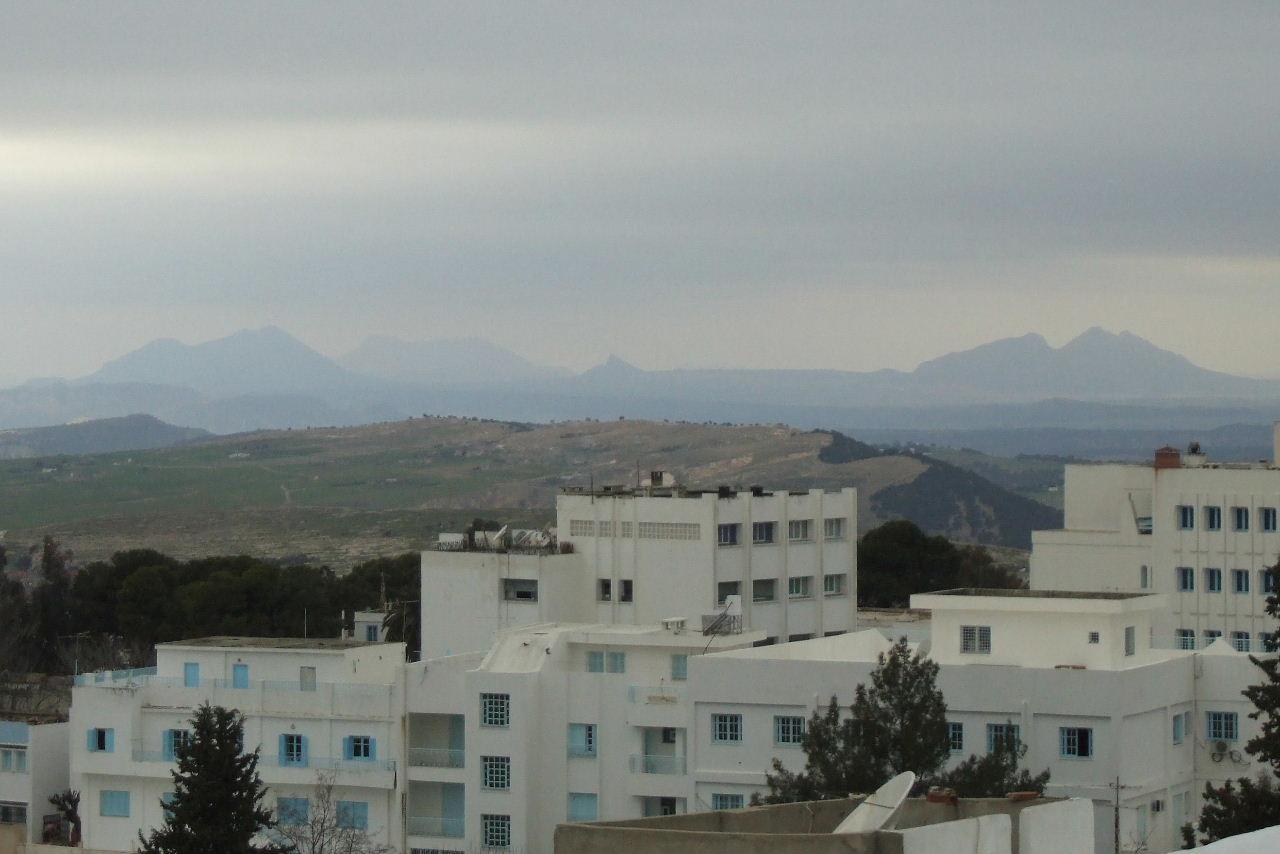
View of the mesa from nearby El Kef

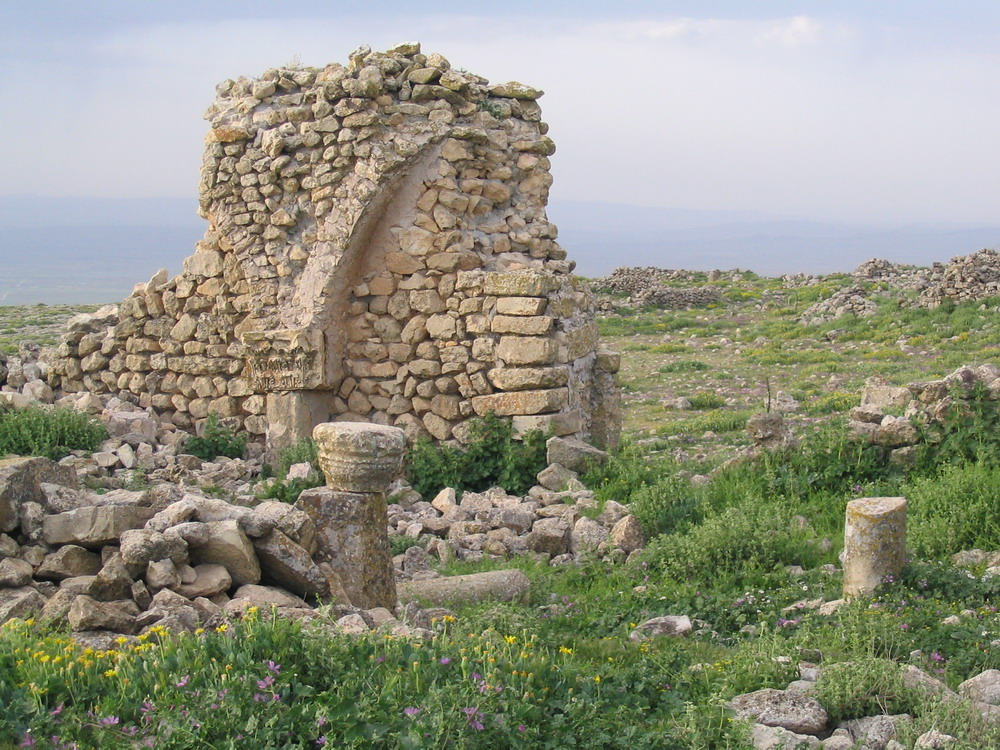
Some of the ruins at the mesa

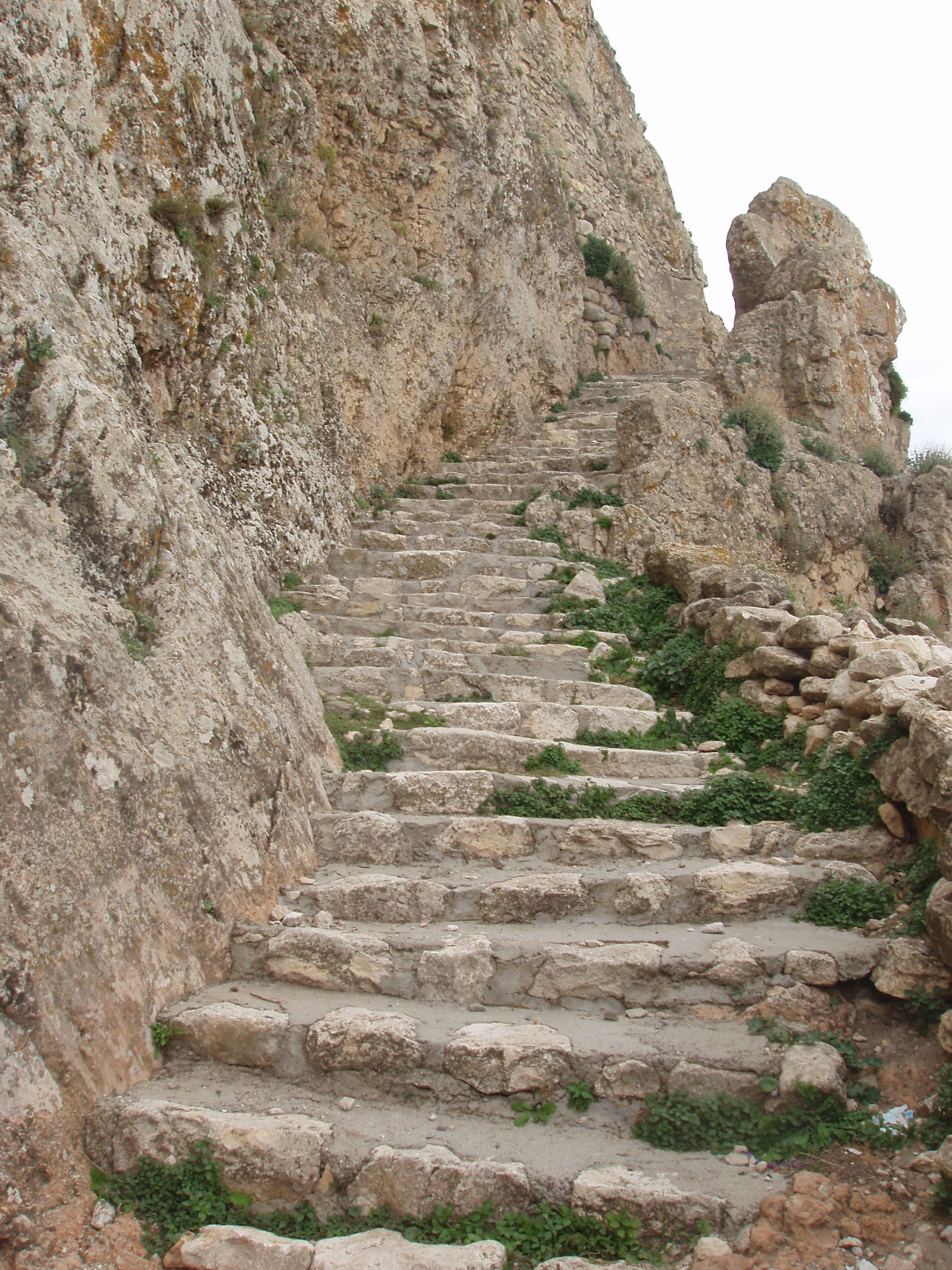
Stairs accessing the mesa top
