= Officer (armed forces) =

Person in a position of authority

A British Army commissioned officer (left) and warrant officer (right) in Afghanistan, 2011

An officer is a person who holds a position of authority as a member of an armed force or uniformed service. Broadly speaking, "officer" means a commissioned officer, a non-commissioned officer (NCO), or a warrant officer. However, absent contextual qualification, the term typically refers only to a force's commissioned officers, the more senior members who derive their authority from a commission from the head of state.

== Numbers ==
The proportion of officers varies greatly. Commissioned officers typically make up between an eighth and a fifth of modern armed forces personnel. In 2013, officers were the senior 17% of the British armed forces, and the senior 13.7% of the French armed forces. In 2012, officers made up about 18% of the German armed forces, and about 16.4% of the United States armed forces.

Historically armed forces have generally had much lower proportions of officers. During the First World War, fewer than 5% of British soldiers were officers (partly because World War One junior officers suffered high casualty rates). In the early 20th century, the Spanish army had the highest proportion of officers of any European army, at 12.5%, which was at that time considered unreasonably high by many Spanish and foreign observers.

Within a nation's armed forces, armies (which are usually larger) tend to have a lower proportion of officers, but a higher total number of officers, while navies and air forces have higher proportions of officers, especially since military aircraft are flown by officers and naval ships and submarines are commanded by officers. For example, 13.9% of British Army personnel and 22.2% of the RAF personnel were officers in 2013, but the British Army had a larger total number of officers.

== Commission sources and training ==
Commissioned officers generally receive training as generalists in leadership and in management, in addition to training relating to their specific military occupational specialty or function in the military.

Many militaries typically require university degrees as a prerequisite for commissioning, even when accessing candidates from the enlisted ranks.

Others, including the Australian Defence Force, the British Armed Forces, the Nepali Army, the Pakistan Armed Forces (PAF), the Swiss Armed Forces, the Singapore Armed Forces, the Israel Defense Forces (IDF), the Swedish Armed Forces, and the New Zealand Defence Force, are different in not requiring a university degree for commissioning, although a significant number of officers in these countries are graduates.

=== United Kingdom ===
In the United Kingdom, there are three routes of entry for British Armed Forces officers.

The first, and primary route are those who receive their commission directly into the officer grades following completion at their relevant military academy. This is known as a Direct Entry (DE) officer scheme.

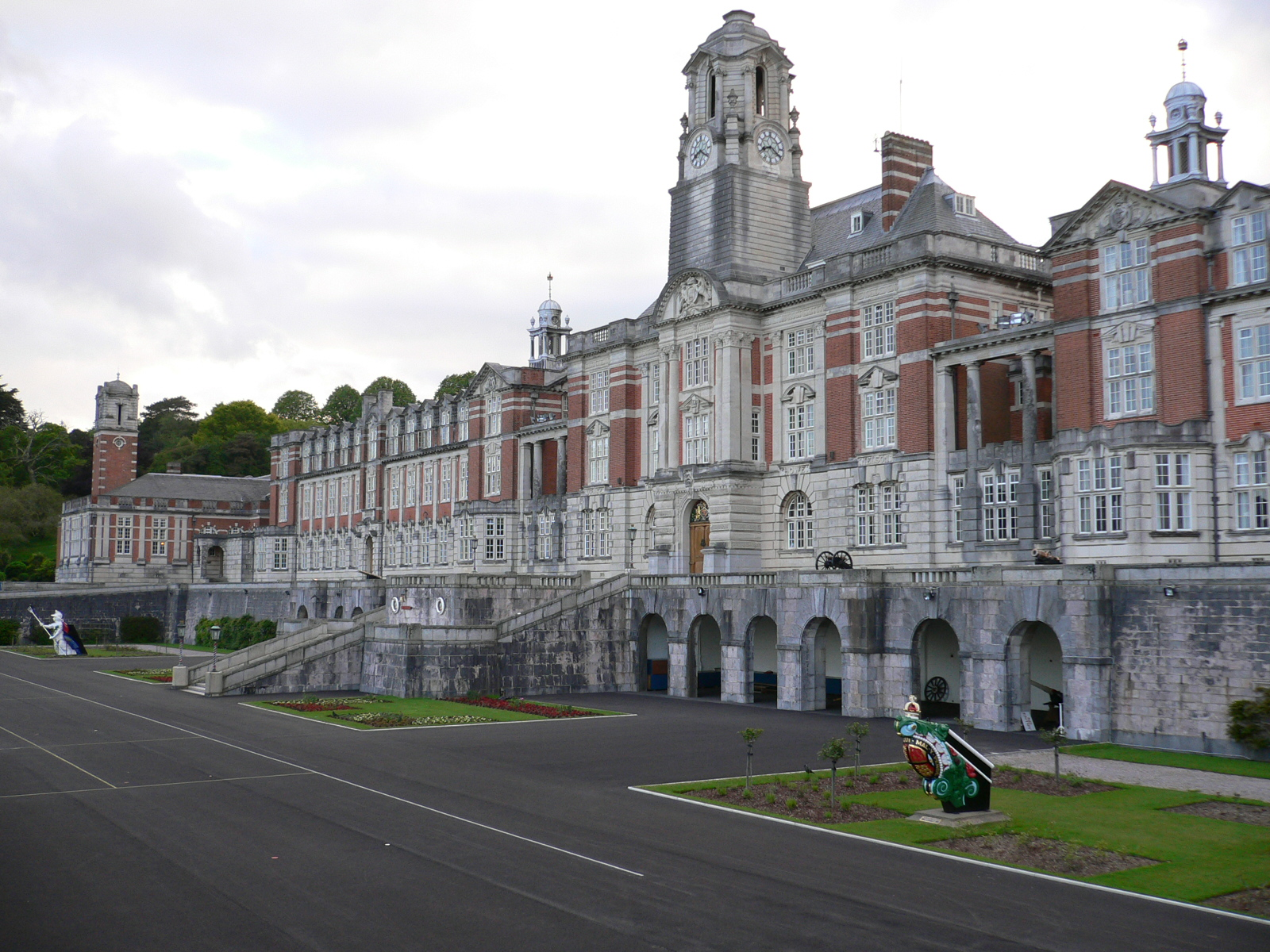
The Royal Navy officer training academy Britannia Royal Naval College at Dartmouth

In the second method, individuals may gain a commission after first enlisting and serving in the junior ranks, and typically reaching one of the senior non-commissioned officer ranks (which start at sergeant (Sgt), and above), as what are known as Service Entry (SE) officers (and are typically and informally known as "ex-rankers"). Service personnel who complete this process at or above the age of 30 are known as Late Entry (LE) officers.

The third route is similar to the second, in that candidates convert from an enlisted rank to a commission; but these are only taken from the highest ranks of SNCOs (warrant officers and equivalents). This route typically involves reduced training requirements in recognition of existing experience. Some examples of this scheme are the RAF's Commissioned Warrant Officer (CWO) course or the Royal Navy's Warrant Officers Commissioning Programme.

In the British Army, commissioning for DE officers occurs after a 44-week course at the Royal Military Academy Sandhurst. The course comprises three 14 weeks terms, focussing on militarisation, leadership and exercises respectively. Army Reserve officers will attend the Army Reserve Commissioning Course, which consists of four two-week modules (A-D). The first two modules may be undertaken over a year for each module at an Officers' Training Corps; the last two must be undertaken at Sandhurst.

Royal Navy officer candidates must complete a 30-week Initial Navy Training (Officer) (INT(O)) course at Britannia Royal Naval College. This comprises 15 weeks militarisation training, followed by 15 weeks professional training, before the candidate commences marinisation.

Royal Air Force (RAF) DE officer candidates must complete a 24-week Modular Initial Officer Training Course (MIOTC) at RAF College Cranwell. This course is split into four 6-week modules covering: militarisation, leadership, management and assessment respectively.

RAF Reserve Officers undertake the Reserve Basic Recruit Training Course (BRTC) at RAF Halton prior to attending Officer specific training at RAF Cranwell College (RAFCC).

The RAF Reserve Officer Initial Training (ROIT) course at RAFCC is spread over a 4 month period and consists of pre-learning, a number of residential weekends, a 15 day intense and 5 day graduation period of residential activity at the College. A significant part of this training is done in collaboration with the Regular courses, often the Specialist Officer Initial Training (SOIT) course.

Royal Marines officers receive their training in the Command Wing of the Commando Training Centre Royal Marines during a 15-month course. The courses consist not only of tactical and combat training, but also of leadership, management, etiquette, and international-affairs training.

Until the Cardwell Reforms of 1871, commissions in the British Army were purchased by officers. The Royal Navy, however, operated on a more meritocratic, or at least socially mobile, basis.

=== United States ===
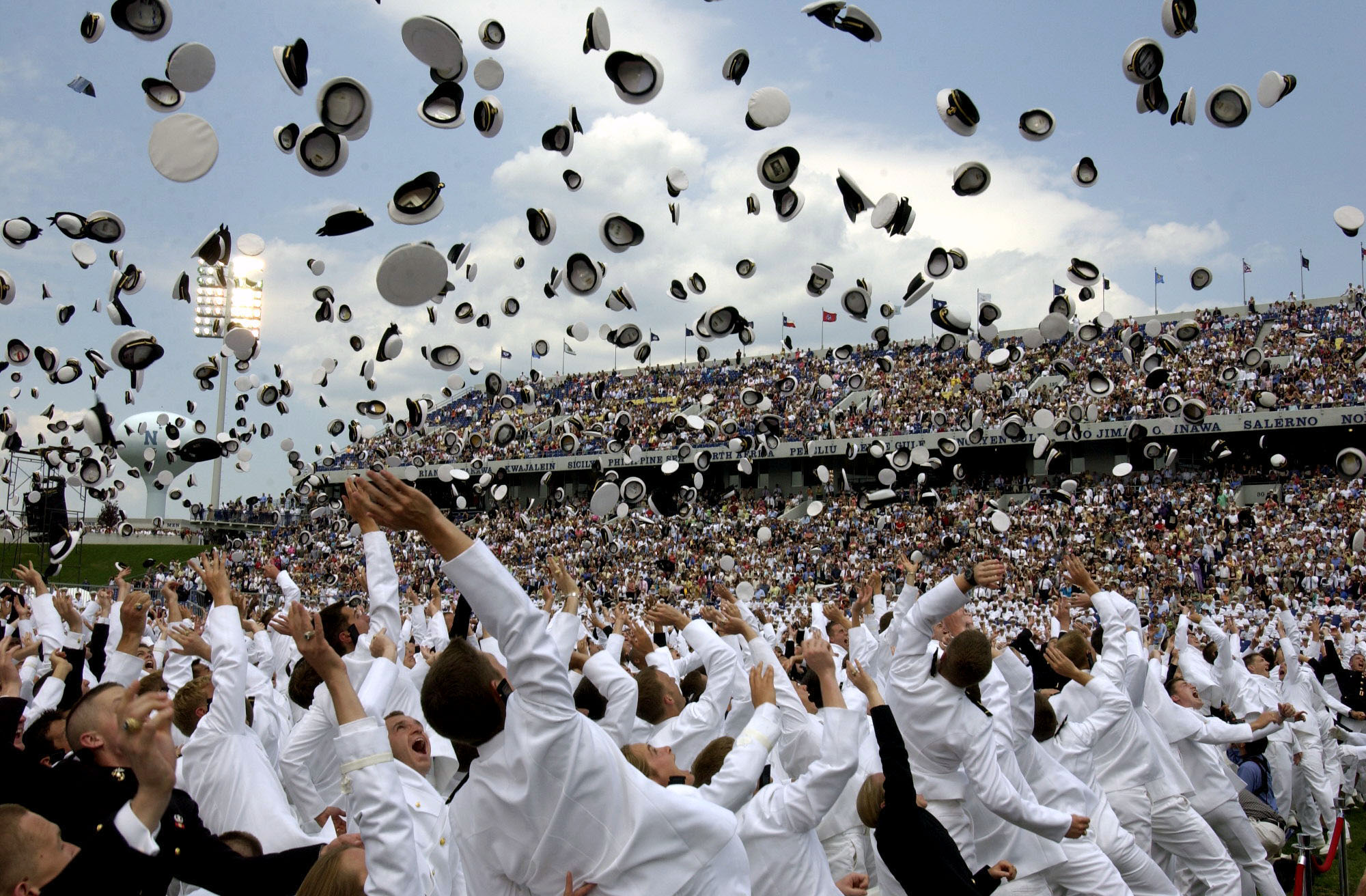
Newly commissioned U.S. Navy and Marine Corps officers celebrate their new positions by throwing their midshipmen covers into the air as part of the U.S. Naval Academy class of 2005 graduation and commissioning ceremony.

==== Types of officers ====
Commissioned officers exist in all eight uniformed services of the United States. All six armed forces of the United States have both commissioned officer and non-commissioned officer (NCO) ranks, and all of them (except the United States Space Force) have warrant-officer ranks. The two noncombatant uniformed services, the United States Public Health Service Commissioned Corps and the National Oceanic and Atmospheric Administration Commissioned Officer Corps (NOAA Corps), have only commissioned officers, with no warrant-officer or enlisted personnel.

Commissioned officers are considered commanding officers under presidential authority. A superior officer is an officer with a higher rank than another officer, who is a subordinate officer relative to the superior.

NCOs, including U.S. Navy and U.S. Coast Guard petty officers and chief petty officers, in positions of authority can be said to have control or charge rather than command per se (although the word "command" is often used unofficially to describe any use of authority). These enlisted naval personnel with authority are officially referred to as 'officers-in-charge" rather than as "commanding officers".

==== Commissioning programs ====
Commissioned officers in the armed forces of the United States come from a variety of accessions sources:

===== Service academies =====
- United States Military Academy (USMA) (commissions second lieutenants in the U.S. Army)
- United States Naval Academy (USNA) (commissions both ensigns in the U.S. Navy and second lieutenants in the U.S. Marine Corps)
- United States Air Force Academy (USAFA) (commissions second lieutenants in the U.S. Air Force and U.S. Space Force)
- United States Coast Guard Academy (USCGA) (commissions ensigns in the U.S. Coast Guard and provides basic officer-training classes for NOAA Corps officer candidates)
- United States Merchant Marine Academy (USMMA) (commissions ensigns in the U.S. Navy Reserve; graduates may apply for active or reserve duty in any of the eight uniformed services of the United States)

Graduates of the United States service academies attend their institutions for no less than four years and, with the exception of the USMMA, are granted active-duty regular commissions immediately upon completion of their training. They make up approximately 20% of the U.S. armed forces officer corps.

===== Reserve Officers' Training Corps (ROTC) =====
Officers in the U.S. Armed Forces may also be commissioned through the Reserve Officers' Training Corps (ROTC).

- Army ROTC
- Naval ROTC (commissions both ensigns in the U.S. Navy and second lieutenants in the U.S. Marine Corps)
- Air Force ROTC (commissions second lieutenants in the U.S. Air Force and U.S. Space Force)

The ROTC is composed of small training programs at several hundred American colleges and universities. There is no Marine Corps ROTC program per se, but there exists a Marine Corps option for selected midshipmen in the Naval ROTC programs at civilian colleges and universities or at non-Federal military colleges such as The Citadel and the Virginia Military Institute.

The Coast Guard has no ROTC program, but does have a Direct Commission Selected School Program for military colleges such as The Citadel and VMI.

Army ROTC graduates of the United States' four junior military colleges can also be commissioned in the U.S. Army with only a two-year associate degree through its Early Commissioning Program, conditioned on subsequently completing a four-year bachelor's degree from an accredited four-year institution within a defined time.

===== Federal officer candidate schools =====
College-graduate candidates (initial or prior-service) may also be commissioned in the U.S. uniformed services via an officer candidate school, officer training school, or other programs:

- Army OCS
- Navy OCS
- Marine Corps OCS
- Air Force Officer Training School (OTS)
- Coast Guard OCS
- USPHS Officer Basic Course (OBC)
- NOAA Corps Basic Officer Training Class (BOTC)

===== Marine Corps Platoon Leaders Class (PLC) =====
A smaller number of Marine Corps officers may be commissioned via the Marine Corps Platoon Leaders Class (PLC) program during summers while attending college. PLC is a sub-element of Marine Corps OCS and college and university students enrolled in PLC undergo military training at Marine Corps Officer Candidate School in two segments: the first of six weeks between their sophomore and junior year and the second of seven weeks between their junior and senior year. There is no routine military training during the academic year for PLC students as is the case for ROTC cadets and midshipmen, but PLC students are routinely visited and their physical fitness periodically tested by Marine Corps officer-selection officers (OSOs) from the nearest Marine Corps officer-recruiting activity. PLC students are placed in one of three general tracks: PLC-Air for prospective marine naval aviators and marine naval flight officers; PLC-Ground for prospective marine infantry, armor, artillery and combat-support officers; and PLC-Law, for prospective Marine Corps judge advocate general officers. Upon graduation from college, PLC students are commissioned as active-duty second lieutenants in the U.S. Marine Corps.

===== National Guard OCS =====
In addition to the ROTC, Army National Guard (ARNG) officers may also be commissioned through state-based officer-candidate schools. These schools train and commission college graduates, prior-servicemembers, and enlisted guard soldiers specifically for the National Guard. Air National Guard officers without prior active duty commissioned service attend the same active-duty OTS at Maxwell AFB, Alabama, as do prospective active duty USAF officers and prospective direct entry Air Force Reserve officers not commissioned via USAFA or AFROTC.

===== Other commissioning programs =====
In the United States Armed Forces, enlisted military personnel without a four-year university degree at the bachelor's level can, under certain circumstances, also be commissioned in the Navy, Marine Corps and Coast Guard limited duty officer (LDO) program. Officers in this category constitute less than 2% of all officers in those services.

Another category in the Army, Navy, Marine Corps and Coast Guard are warrant officers / chief warrant officers (WO/CWO). These are specialist officers who do not require a bachelor's degree and are exclusively selected from experienced mid- to senior-level enlisted ranks (e.g., E-5 with eight years' time in service for the Marine Corps, E-7 and above for Navy and Coast Guard). The rank of warrant officer (WO1, also known as W-1) is an appointed rank by warrant from the respective branch secretary until promotion to chief warrant officer (CWO2, also known as W-2) by presidential commission, and holders are entitled to the same customs and courtesies as commissioned officers. Their difference from line and staff corps officers is their focus as single specialty/military occupational field subject-matter experts, though under certain circumstances they can fill command positions.

The Air Force has discontinued its warrant-officer program and has no LDO program. Similarly, the Space Force was created with no warrant-officer or LDO programs; both services require all commissioned officers to possess a bachelor's degree prior to commissioning.

The U.S. Public Health Service Commissioned Corps and NOAA Corps have no warrant officers or enlisted personnel, and all personnel must enter those services via commissioning.

==== Direct commission ====
Direct commission is another route to becoming a commissioned officer. Credentialed civilian professionals such as scientists, pharmacists, physicians, nurses, clergy, and attorneys are directly commissioned upon entry into the military or another federal uniformed service. However, these officers generally do not exercise command authority outside of their job-specific support corps (e.g., U.S. Army Medical Corps; U.S. Navy Judge Advocate General's Corps, etc.). The United States Public Health Service Commissioned Corps and the National Oceanic and Atmospheric Administration Commissioned Officer Corps almost exclusively use direct commission to commission their officers, although NOAA will occasionally accept commissioned officers from the U.S. Navy, primarily Naval Aviators, via interservice transfer.

During the U.S. participation in World War II (1941–1945), civilians with expertise in industrial management also received direct commissions to stand up materiel production for the U.S. armed forces.

==== Discontinued U.S. officer-commissioning programs ====
Although significantly represented in the retired senior commissioned officer ranks of the U.S. Navy, a much smaller cohort of current active-duty and active-reserve officers (all of the latter being captains or flag officers as of 2017) were commissioned via the Navy's since discontinued Aviation Officer Candidate School (AOCS) program for college graduates. The AOCS focused on producing line officers for naval aviation who would become Naval Aviators and Naval Flight Officers upon completion of flight training, followed by a smaller cohort who would become Naval Air Intelligence officers and Aviation Maintenance Duty Officers.

Designated as "aviation officer candidates" (AOCs), individuals in the AOCS program were primarily non-prior military service college graduates, augmented by a smaller cohort of college-educated active duty, reserve or former enlisted personnel.

In the late 1970s, a number of Air Force ROTC cadets and graduates originally slated for undergraduate pilot training (UPT) or undergraduate navigator training (UNT) lost their flight training slots either immediately prior to or subsequent to graduation, but prior to going on active duty, due to a post-Vietnam reduction in force (RIF) that reduced the number of flight training slots for AFROTC graduates by approximately 75% in order to retain flight-training slots for USAFA cadets and graduates during the same time period. Many of these individuals, at the time all male, declined or resigned their inactive USAF commissions and also attended AOCS for follow-on naval flight-training. AOCs were active-duty personnel in pay grade E-5 (unless having previously held a higher active duty or reserve enlisted grade in any of the U.S. armed forces) for the duration of their 14-week program. Upon graduation, they were commissioned as ensigns in the then-U.S. Naval Reserve on active duty, with the option to augment their commissions to the Regular Navy after four to six years of commissioned service.

The AOCS also included the embedded Aviation Reserve Officer Candidate (AVROC) and Naval Aviation Cadet (NAVCAD) programs. AVROC was composed of college students who would attend AOCS training in two segments similar to Marine Corps PLC but would do so between their junior and senior years of college and again following college graduation, receiving their commission upon completion of the second segment. The NAVCAD program operated from 1935 through 1968 and again from 1986 through 1993. NAVCADs were enlisted or civilian personnel who had completed two years of college but lacked bachelor's degrees. NAVCADs would complete the entire AOCS program but would not be commissioned until completion of flight training and receiving their wings. After their initial operational tour, they could be assigned to a college or university full-time for no more than two years in order to complete their bachelor's degree. AVROC and NAVCAD were discontinued when AOCS was merged into OCS in the mid-1990s.

Similar to NAVCAD was the Marine Aviation Cadet (MarCad) program, created in July 1959 to access enlisted Marines and civilians with at least two years of college. Many, but not all, MarCads attended enlisted "boot camp" at Marine Corps Recruit Depot Parris Island or Marine Corps Recruit Depot San Diego, as well as the School of Infantry, before entering naval flight-training. MarCads would then complete their entire flight-training syllabus as cadets. Graduates were designated Naval Aviators and commissioned as 2nd Lieutenants on active duty in the Marine Corps Reserve. They would then report to The Basic School (TBS) for newly commissioned USMC officers at Marine Corps Base Quantico prior to reporting to a replacement air group (RAG)/fleet replacement squadron (FRS) and then to operational Fleet Marine Force (FMF) squadrons. Like their NAVCAD graduate counterparts, officers commissioned via MarCad had the option to augment to the Regular Marine Corps following four to six years of commissioned service. The MarCad program closed to new applicants in 1967 and the last trainee graduated in 1968.

Another discontinued commissioning program was the Air Force's aviation cadet program. Originally created by the U.S. Army Signal Corps in 1907 to train pilots for its then-fledgling aviation program, it was later used by the subsequent U.S. Army Air Service, U.S. Army Air Corps and U.S. Army Air Forces to train pilots, navigators, bombardiers and observers through World War I, the interwar period, World War II, and the immediate postwar period between September 1945 and September 1947. With the establishment of the U.S. Air Force as an independent service in September 1947, it then became a source for USAF pilots and navigators. Cadets had to be between the ages of 19 and 25 and to possess either at least two years of college/university-level education or three years of a scientific or technical education. In its final iteration, cadets received the pay of enlisted pay grade E-5 and were required to complete all pre-commissioning training and flight training before receiving their wings as pilots or navigators and their commissions as 2nd lieutenants on active duty in the U.S. Air Force Reserve on the same day. Aviation cadets were later offered the opportunity to apply for a commission in the regular Air Force and to attend a college or university to complete a four-year degree. As the Air Force's AFROTC and OTS programs began to grow, and with the Air Force's desire for a 100% college-graduate officer corps, the aviation cadet program was slowly phased out. The last aviation cadet pilot graduated in October 1961 and the last aviation cadet navigators in 1965. By the 1990s, the last of these officers had retired from the active duty Regular Air Force, the Air Force Reserve and the Air National Guard.

The Academy of Military Science (AMS) is a discontinued commissioning program for the Air Force, designed to train and commission officers for the Air National Guard. The curriculum of AMS was very similar to OTS, but it was a six-week (and later eight-week) course instead of the traditional nine-week OTS course. The primary reason for the shorter course length is because 85 percent of AMS candidates had prior military service, when they arrived at the AMS course, compared to about 40 percent of OTS students having had the prior military experience.

=== Commonwealth of Nations ===
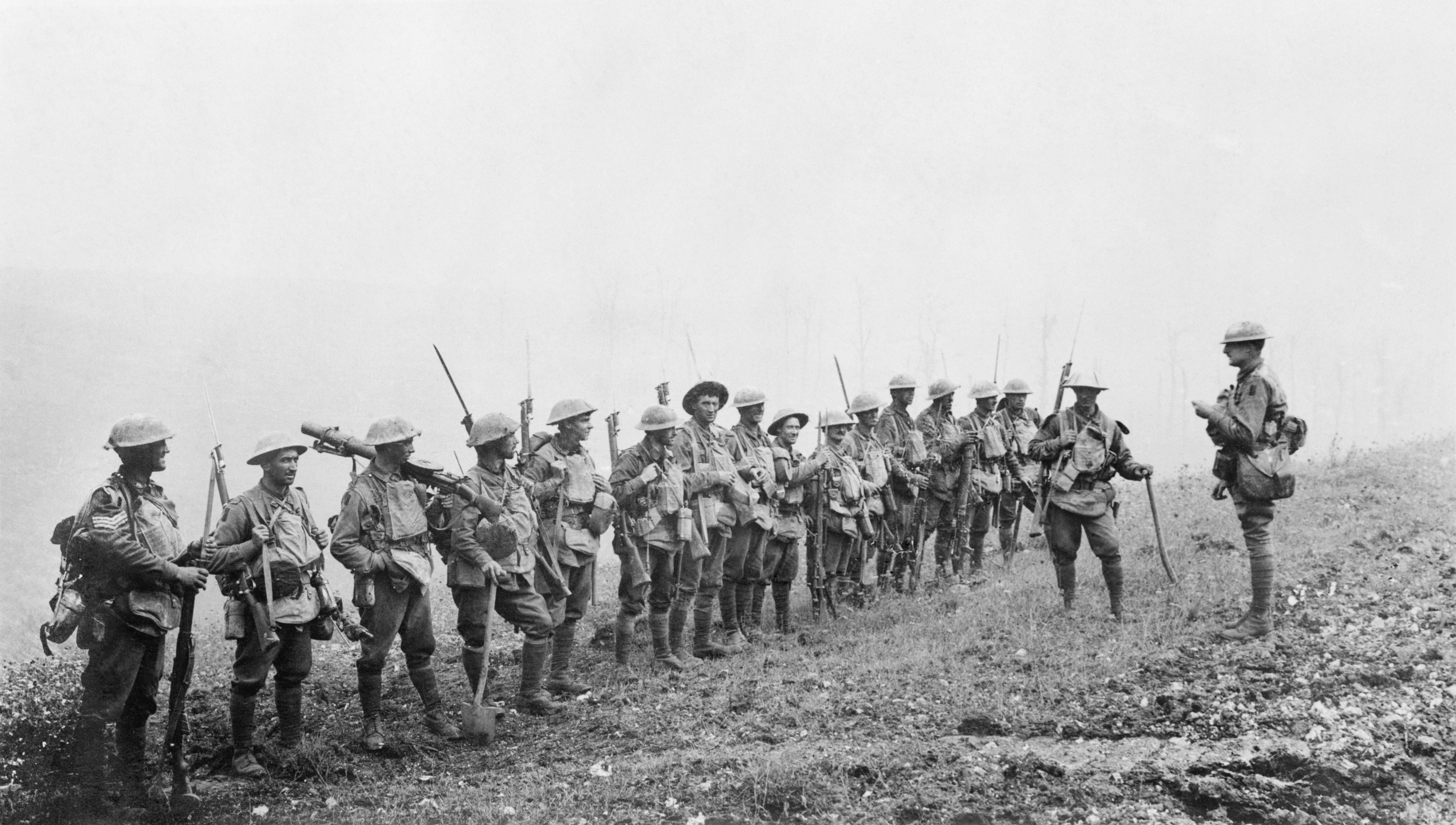
A platoon from the Australian 29th Battalion being addressed by their officer commanding in August 1918

In countries whose ranking systems are based upon the models of the British Armed Forces (BAF), officers from the rank of second lieutenant (army), sub-lieutenant (navy) or pilot officer (air force) to the rank of general, admiral or air chief marshal respectively, are holders of a commission granted to them by the appropriate awarding authority. In United Kingdom (UK) and other Commonwealth realms, the awarding authority is the monarch (or a governor general representing the monarch) as head of state. The head of state often has the power to award commissions, or has commissions awarded in their name.

In Commonwealth nations, commissioned officers are given commissioning scrolls (also known as commissioning scripts) signed by the sovereign or the governor general acting on the monarch's behalf. Upon receipt, this is an official legal document that binds the mentioned officer to the commitment stated on the scroll.

Non-commissioned members rise from the lowest ranks in most nations. Education standards for non-commissioned members are typically lower than for officers (with the exception of specialized military and highly-technical trades; such as aircraft, weapons or electronics engineers). Enlisted members only receive leadership training after promotion to positions of responsibility, or as a prerequisite for such. In the past (and in some countries today but to a lesser extent), non-commissioned members were almost exclusively conscripts, whereas officers were volunteers.

In certain Commonwealth nations, commissioned officers are made commissioners of oaths by virtue of their office and can thus administer oaths or take affidavits or declarations, limited in certain cases by rank or by appointment, and generally limited to activities or personnel related to their employment.

== Warrant officers ==
In some branches of many armed forces, there exists a third grade of officer known as a warrant officer. In the armed forces of the United States, warrant officers are initially appointed by the Secretary of the service and then commissioned by the President of the United States upon promotion to chief warrant officer. In many other countries (as in the armed forces of the Commonwealth nations), warrant officers often fill the role of very senior non-commissioned officers. Their position is affirmed by warrant from the bureaucracy directing the force—for example, the position of regimental sergeant major in regiments of the British Army is held by a warrant officer appointed by the British government.

In the U.S. military, a warrant officer is a technically focused subject matter expert, such as helicopter pilot or information technology specialist. Until 2024, there were no warrant officers in the U.S. Air Force and the U.S. Space Force continues to have no warrant officers; the last of the previous cohort of USAF warrant officers retired in the 1980s and the ranks became dormant until the program was resurrected in 2024. The USSF has not established any warrant officer ranks. All other U.S. Armed Forces have warrant officers, with warrant accession programs unique to each individual service's needs. Although Warrant Officers normally have more years in service than commissioned officers, they are below commissioned officers in the rank hierarchy. In certain instances, commissioned chief warrant officers can command units.

== Non-commissioned officers ==
A non-commissioned officer (NCO) is an enlisted member of the armed forces holding a position of some degree of authority who has (usually) obtained it by advancement from within the non-commissioned ranks. Officers who are non-commissioned usually receive management and leadership training, but their function is to serve as supervisors within their area of trade specialty. Senior NCOs serve as advisers and leaders from the duty section level to the highest levels of the armed forces establishment, while lower NCO grades are not yet considered management specialists. The duties of an NCO can vary greatly in scope, so that an NCO in one country may hold almost no authority, while others such as the United States and the United Kingdom consider their NCOs to be "the backbone of the military" due to carrying out the orders of those officers appointed over them.

In most maritime forces (navies and coast guards), the NCO ranks are called petty officers and chief petty officers while enlisted ranks prior to attaining NCO/petty officer status typically known as seaman, airman, fireman, or some derivation thereof. In most traditional infantry, marine and air forces, the NCO ranks are known as corporals and sergeants, with non-NCO enlisted ranks referred to as privates and airmen.

However, some countries use the term commission to describe the promotion of enlisted soldiers, especially in countries with mandatory service in the armed forces. These countries refer to their NCOs as professional soldiers, rather than as officers.

== Officer ranks and accommodation ==
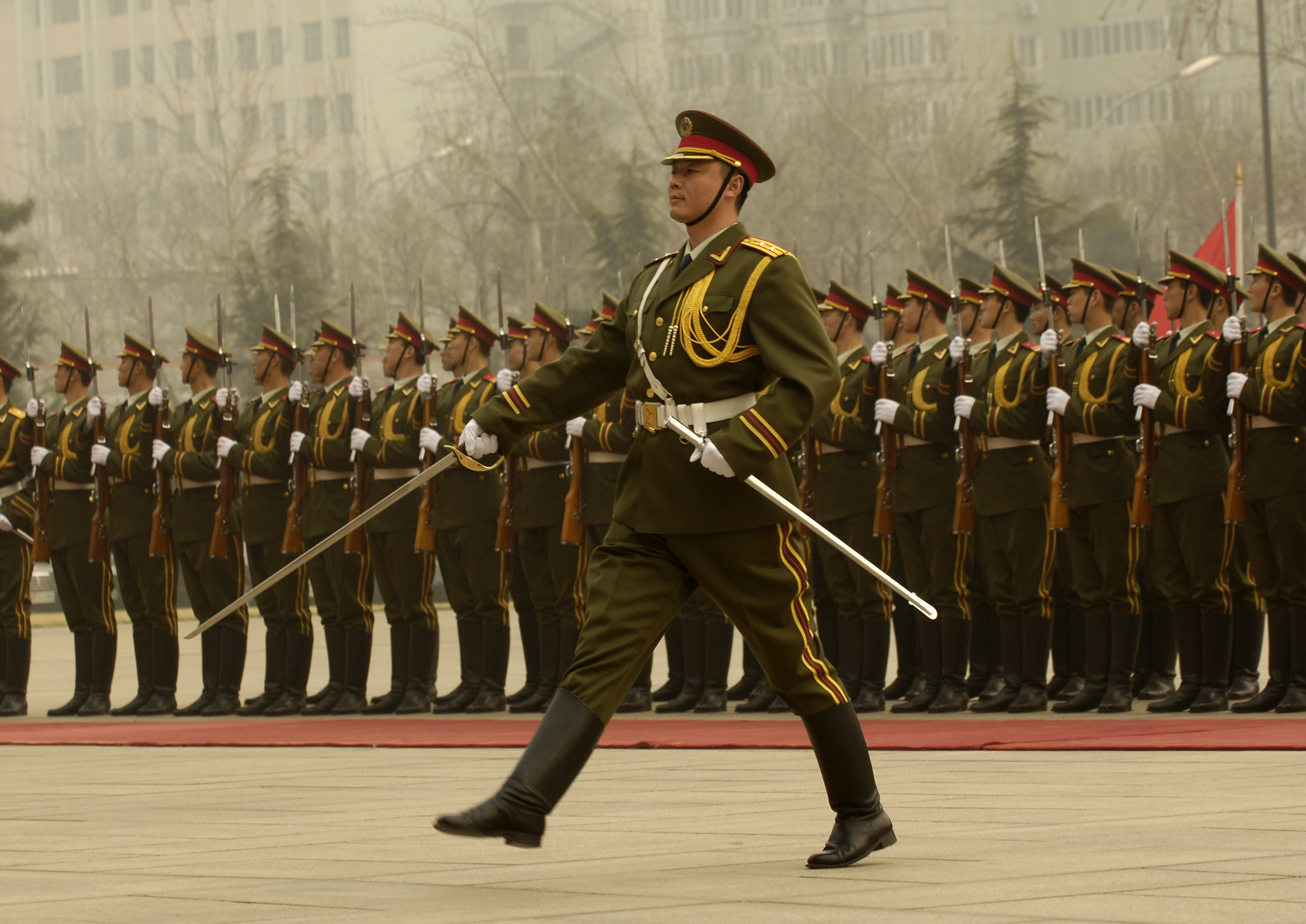
An officer of the People's Liberation Army.

Officers in nearly every country of the world are segregated from the enlisted soldiers, sailors, airmen, marines and coast guardsmen in many facets of military life. Facilities accommodating needs such as messing (i.e., mess hall or mess deck versus officers mess or wardroom), separate billeting/berthing, domiciles, and general recreation facilities are separated between officers and enlisted personnel. This system is focused on discouraging fraternization and encouraging professional and ethical relations between officers and enlisted military personnel.

Officers do not routinely perform physical labor; they typically supervise enlisted personnel doing so, either directly or via non-commissioned officers. Commissioned officers will and do perform physical labor when operationally required to do so, e.g., in combat. However, it would be very unusual for an officer to perform physical labor in garrison, at home station or in homeport. Article 49 of the Third Geneva Convention stipulates that even as prisoners of war, commissioned officers cannot be compelled to work, and NCOs can only be given supervisory work.

== See also ==
- Brevet (military)
- Exchange officer
- Foreign Service Officer
- List of comparative military ranks
- Mustang (military officer)
- Officer (disambiguation)
- Roving commission
- STA-21
- Staff officer
