= Oxyntas =

Numidian prince (fl. 104–89 BC)

Oxyntas was a son of the Numidian King Jugurtha.

He walked with his brother Iampsas in the famous Roman general Gaius Marius's triumphal parade of 104 BC after his father's defeat. His father died soon afterward, but Oxyntas was sent to the town of Venusia, in the southern Italian region of Basilicata, where he remained until 89 BC. In the Social War, the Samnite general Gaius Papius Mutilus used Oxyntas to inspire defections among the Numidian troops serving under the Roman general and uncle of Caesar, Sextus Julius Caesar (Appian, Civil Wars, 1.42). It is not known what happened to Oxyntas after the Social War (91–88 BC).

== See also ==
- Jugurtha
- Jugurthine War
- List of Kings of Numidia
