= Massiva II =

King of Numidia
- Reign: 111–110 BC
- Predecessor: Jugurtha
- Successor: Jugurtha
- Rival: Jugurtha (111–110 BC)
- Born: Numidia
- Died: c.110 BC; Rome
- Dynasty: Massylii
- Father: Gulussa

Massiva II was a pretender to the throne of Numidia during Jugurtha's reign, he was the son of King Gulussa and grandson of Massinissa.

== Biography ==
After the death of King Micipsa in 118 BC, Numidia was contested between his heirs and Jugurtha. Following the siege and massacre of Cirta and the assassination of Adherbal (112 BC), Massiva sought refuge in Rome.

At the instigation of the consul Spurius Postumius Albinus, governor of the province of Africa, he claimed the Numidian kingship before the Senate and possibly being chosen as a rival king. His favorable reception by the Romans worried Jugurtha, who tasked his loyal follower Bomilcar with orchestrating his assassination. Massiva was killed in Rome in 110 BC.

Several ancient authors recount the event:

- Florus summarizes it by writing that Jugurtha had his "rival to the throne" eliminated.
- Diodorus Siculus presents him as a “second Jugurtha,” emphasizing his popularity in Rome.
- Livy (Periochae, 64, 2) and Appian (Numidica, ed. Didot, p. 163) indicate that Jugurtha subsequently had to flee Italy.
- Sallust, in his Bellum Iugurthinum, recounts the assassination of Massiva II to highlight Jugurtha's ambition and treachery. Fearing that Massiva might enjoy Roman support, Jugurtha had him assassinated even on Roman soil, demonstrating not only his cruelty but also his skill in exploiting the weakness and corruption of the Roman elite. This episode thus illustrates, according to Sallust, the mixture of cunning, violence, and corruption that characterized Numidian politics and, by extension, reflected the moral decadence of the Roman Republic.
