= Officer (disambiguation) =

An Officer is a person of authority within an organization.

Officer or Officers may also refer to:

== Arts, entertainment, and media ==
- Officer (2001 film), an Indian Hindi-language film
- Officer (2018 film), an Indian Telugu-language film
- Officer (2026 film), a Bangladeshi film
- Officers (film), a 1971 Russian film
- Officers (video game), 2008

== Roles ==
- Officer (armed forces)
- Police officer
- Officer (Salvation Army)

== Other uses ==
- Officer, Victoria, Australia
  - Officer railway station
- Officer Creek, South Australia
