= Official (disambiguation) =

An official is, in the primary sense, someone who holds an office in an organisation, of any kind, but participating in the exercise of authority, such as in government. It may also refer to something endowed with governmental or other authoritative recognition or mandate, as in official language, official gazette, and official journal.

Official may also refer to:

== People ==
- DJ Official (1976–2016), professional name of Nelson J. Chu, an American Christian hip hop musician

== Religion ==
- Religious official (disambiguation), a person who has ecclesiastical authority within a community of faith

== Sports ==
- Referee, person who enforces the rules and maintains order in numerous sports, such as:
  - Official (basketball)
  - Official (ice hockey)
  - Gridiron football:
    - Official (American football)
    - Official (Canadian football)
  - Officials (Association football)
  - Official (tennis)
  - Official (rugby league)
- Official scorer (baseball), person who records the events on the field in the game of baseball

== Other uses ==
- OFFICIAL, a classification under the United Kingdom's Government Security Classifications Policy
- Official, an album by Lina Larissa Strahl
- "Official", a song by Charli XCX from Charli
