= Battle of Aesernia =

90 BCE battle of the Social War

The Battle of Aesernia took place in the year 90 BC during the Social War. A force under the consul Lucius Julius Caesar, an uncle of the more famous Julius Caesar, was engaged while moving to relieve the siege of Aesernia and defeated by a rebel force under Titus Vettius Scato. Orosius wrote that Caesar had to entirely rebuild his army with Gallic and African troops after the battle while Appian admits only 2,000 Roman dead. As a result of their victory the rebels had enough spare forces to reinforce the army besieging Aesernia while another army took Venafrum. It is also possible Venafrum joined the rebels.
