= Faustus Cornelius Sulla =

Faustus Cornelius Sulla may refer to:

- Faustus Cornelius Sulla (quaestor 54 BC)
- Faustus Cornelius Sulla (consul 31)
- Faustus Cornelius Sulla Felix, son of the previous, consul in 52 AD.
