= Religious official =

A religious official is a person, in a clergy or Holy Order, who has the authority over religious ceremonies or rituals (worship).

It may mean:

- Priest / Priestess
- Minister
- Rabbi
- Imam
- Pastor
- Brahmin
- Vedic priest
- Archpriest
- Hieromonk
- Vicar
- Mobad
- Shaman
- Witch doctor
- Goði
- Druid
- Oracle

== See also ==
- Priesthood (Community of Christ)
- Priesthood (Latter Day Saints)
