= Lucius Julius Caesar (consul 90 BC) =

Roman statesman and general

- Born: c. 134 BC
- Died: 87 BC; Rome
- Cause of death: Executed by Gaius Marius
- Occupations: General and politician
- Office: Governor of Macedonia (93 BC); Consul (90 BC); Censor (89 BC)
- Children: Lucius and Julia (mother of Mark Antony)

Lucius Julius Caesar (c. 134 – 87 BC), 2nd cousin of the dictator Gaius Julius Caesar, was a Roman statesman and general of the late 2nd and early 1st centuries BC. He was involved in the downfall of the plebeian tribune Lucius Appuleius Saturninus in 100 BC. He was consul of the Roman Republic in 90 BC during the Social War. During the war he commanded several Roman legions against the Italian Allies (turned rebels). He was awarded a Triumph for his victories over the Samnites at Acerrae.

== Career ==
He was elected praetor for 94 BC though no evidence exists for his previous occupation of the roles of quaestor and aedile. In 93 BC, as propraetor, he was governor of Macedonia.

=== Consulship and Social War ===
At the end of 91 BC, he ran for the consulship and was elected one of the two consuls for 90 BC. He was allotted the fight against the southern group of rebels while his consular colleague Publius Rutilius Lupus fought the northern group. Lucius Cornelius Sulla, the later dictator, acted as one of Lucius Caesar's lieutenants (probably his senior legate because at the end of the campaigning season Lucius Caesar left Sulla in command of his army).

Lucius Caesar sent a force of two legions to head off rebel reinforcements to the Italians besieging Aesernia, but they were defeated and retreated with the loss of 2,000 men. After regrouping his army and having received some reinforcements, Lucius Caesar marched against the Samnite consul Gaius Papius Mutilus who was moving towards Acerrae. Mutilus made a direct assault on Lucius Caesar's camp, but was driven back with the loss of 6,000 men. It was the first substantial defeat of the rebels during the war.

Lucius Caesar now tried to move to Aesernia again. He marched his army through the Volturnus valley, but was ambushed at a rocky defile called the Melfa Gorge. Since the Romans were expecting an ambush they were prepared and able to fight their way out of the trap to the nearby town of Teanum. Caesar lost some 8,000 of his 30,000 infantry, but the army stayed intact and continued to Acerrae. The Romans were not able to raise the siege of Acerrae but they were able to raise the defenders spirit and so they held out.

At the end of the campaigning season, Lucius Caesar left his army in winter quarters in Campania (under the command of Sulla) while he returned to Rome to propose legislation (the Lex Julia de civitate Latinis et sociis danda) which gave Roman citizenship to any Italian who had not taken up arms against the Romans. This marked the turning point of the war.

For his victory over Mutilus, Lucius Caesar was awarded a Triumph. Having finished his year as consul Lucius Caesar handed over to his successor and departed for Picenum where he served as a senior legate to Gnaeus Pompeius Strabo.

In 89 BC, Lucius or his relative Sextus (the sources are not clear) inflicted a great defeat on the rebels outside Asculum by falling on the enemy while they were shifting to new camp-grounds killing 8,000 and routing the rest. Lucius Caesar also became censor in 89 and due to the success of the Julian Law, became responsible for allocating new citizens into voting districts but was unable to do so because of continuing civil strife. His colleague in this task was a former consul, Publius Licinius Crassus (father of triumvir Marcus Licinius Crassus).

== Death ==
Lucius Caesar and his brother, Gaius Julius Caesar Strabo Vopiscus, were killed in 87 BC during the Civil War between Gaius Marius and Lucius Cornelius Sulla. After Sulla had left for the East to fight against Mithridates of Pontus, Marius returned from banishment and started executing his political opponents. Lucius and Gaius were among his first victims. According to Livy, their heads were displayed on pikes on the speaker's platform (the Rostra) in the Forum.

== Family ==
His children, by his wife Fulvia, were Lucius Julius Caesar, who was consul in 64 BC, and Julia, who would later become the mother of Mark Antony.

Political offices
| Preceded by L. Marcius Philippus; Sex. Julius Caesar | Roman consul 90 BC; With: P. Rutilius Lupus | Succeeded by Cn. Pompeius Strabo; L. Porcius Cato |
