= Dock warrant =

Marine law document

A dock warrant, in law, is a document by which the owner of a marine or river dock certifies that the holder is entitled to goods imported and warehoused in the docks.

In the Factors Act 1889 it is included in the phrase "document of title" and is defined as any document or writing, being evidence of the title of any person therein named ... to the property in any goods or merchandise lying in any warehouse or wharf and signed or certified by the person having the custody of the goods. It passes by indorsement and delivery and transfers the absolute right to the goods described in it.

In England, as of 1911, a dock warrant was liable to a stamp duty of threepence, which was denoted by an adhesive stamp, to be cancelled by the person by whom the instrument is executed or issued.
