= Warrant Officer 1 =

Warrant Officer 1 may refer to:

- Warrant officer (United States), rank grade W-1 in the United States Military
- Warrant officer (United Kingdom), rank class WO1 in the British Army
- Warrant Officer First Class, a rank in the Royal Canadian Air Cadets
