= Gaius Papius Mutilus =

1st century BC Samnite leader of an anti-Rome rebellion

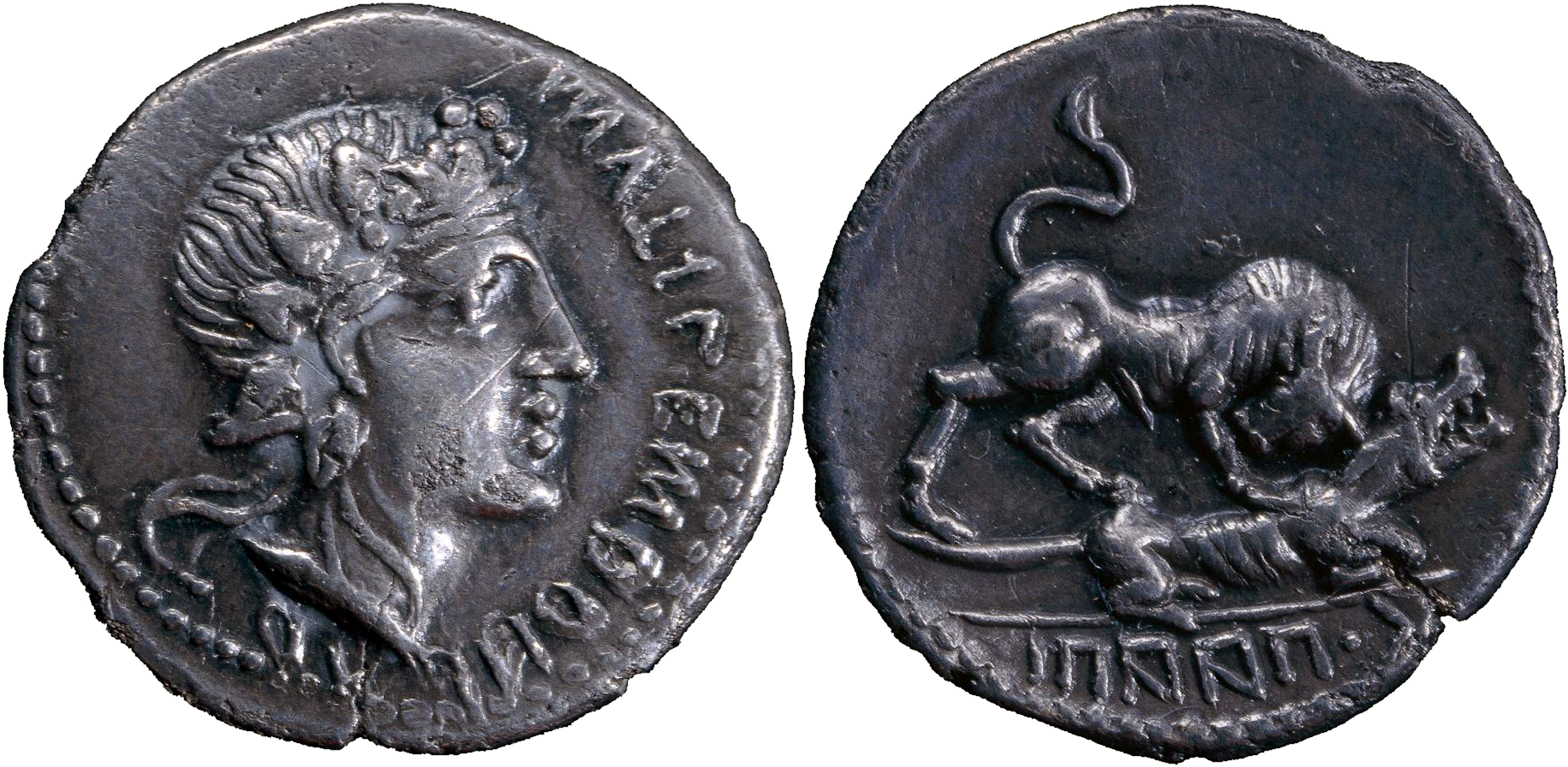
Denarius of C. Papius Mutilus, minted in 90 BC. The obverse portrays Bacchus, while the reverse displays an allegory of the Social War, with the Italian Bull goring the Roman Wolf.

Gaius Papius Mutilus was a Samnite noble who is best known for being the leader of the southern rebels who fought against the army of Rome in the Social War (also known as the Italian War); was a member of the clan Variani/Varriano. His father was Gaius Papius Mutilus, who held the highest Samnite magistracy in Bovianum a number of times in the second half of the 2nd century BC

== The southern forces under Gaius Papius ==
The Samnite army, consisting of southern rebels, was very similar to that of the Romans. Two men were elected consuls while another twelve were granted the position of praetor. The consuls were the leaders of their respective armies and are referred to as “commanders in chief". Papius became the consul for the southern rebel forces, known as the Samnites, in 90 BC. His fellow consul was Quintus Poppaedius Silo; the leader of a centrally located army, staffed mainly by members of the Italian tribe of the Marsi. Both of these men held the position of consul into the year 89 BC due to their success during the campaigning season of the following year.

== Success in battle ==
Papius achieved great success as the leader of the Samnite army during his advance into Roman territory. One of the more famous battles fought by the southern rebels occurred in the city of Nola. The Samnite army captured the city with 2,000 Roman soldiers remaining inside. The soldiers did not accept Papius' offer to serve under him and were therefore starved to death.

Following his victory at Nola, Papius took the cities of Stabiae, Minervium, and Salernum while conquering the country around Nuceria. The citizens of these cities and those surrounding them feared the wrath of Papius. He gathered the prisoners and slaves from each city while also being given infantry and cavalry out of fear (these troops amounted to over 10,000 infantry and 1,000 cavalry). Papius continued to destroy the Romans while continuing to have success in Campania. During his leadership of the Samnite army, Papius only lost two notable battles. These were to consul Lucius Julius Caesar in 90 BC and to Lucius Cornelius Sulla in 89 BC. Following his loss to Sulla, Papius is said to have been granted Roman citizenship. Papius Mutilus was not prominent during the ensuing civil wars. Shortly after, he was proscribed and committed suicide in 80 BC.

== Bibliography ==
- Alberto Campana, La Monetazione degli insorti italici durante la Guerra Sociale (91-87 a.C.), Soliera, Edizioni Apparuti, 1987.
