= List of conflicts in Tunisia =

Location of Tunisia in northern Africa.

The Phoenicians were the first known immigrant population to colonise the region of present-day Tunisia. Their city of Carthage grew to importance in the first millennium BC, when it vied with Rome for western Mediterranean dominance. Between 264 and 146 BC, Rome and Carthage waged the Punic Wars, with the ultimate victory going to Rome. The Romans occupied Tunisia for most of the next 800 years, until they were supplanted by Arab invaders during the early Islamic conquests of 647–697 AD. The expansion of the Ottoman Empire in the 15th and 16th centuries included the annexation of Tunisia in 1574. In 1881, Tunisia was occupied by France and as a French protectorate was the scene of several battles between Allied and Axis forces during World War II.

== Ancient Times ==
=== Carthaginian Empire ===
- 264 — 146 BCE Punic Wars
  - 264 — 241 BCE First Punic War

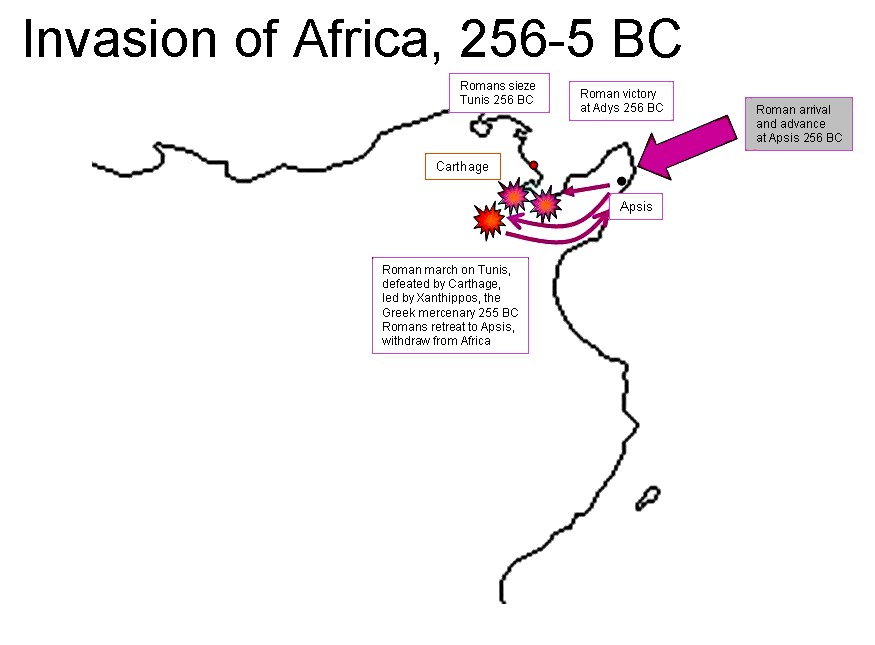
First Punic War

    - Early 255 BCE Siege of Aspis
    - Early 255 BCE Battle of Adys
    - 255 BCE Battle of Tunis
  - 240 — 238 BCE Mercenary War
    - Spring 240 BCE Battle of Utica
    - Autumn 240 BCE Battle of the Bagradas River
    - Autumn 240 BCE Hamilcar's victory with Navaras
    - 238 BCE Battle of "The Saw"
    - 238 BCE Siege of Tunis
  - 218 — 201 BCE Second Punic War

Second Punic War

    - 203 BCE Battle of Utica
    - 203 BCE Battle of the Great Plains
    - October 19, 202 BCE Battle of Zama
  - 149 — 146 BCE Third Punic War
    - 147 BCE Battle of the Port of Carthage
    - 147 BCE Battle of Nepheris
    - circa 149 BCE — Spring 146 BCE Battle of Carthage

=== Kingdom of Numidia ===
- 112 - 106 BCE Jugurthine War
  - 111 - 104 BCE Battle of Thala
  - 110 BCE Battle of Suthul
  - 108 BCE Battle of the Muthul

=== Roman Province of Africa ===
- 238 CE Battle of Carthage
- 439 CE Genseric chose to break the treaty between the Vandals and the Romans when he invaded the province of Africa Proconsularis and laid siege to Carthage.
- Germanic Wars
  - 468 CE Battle of Cap Bon

== Medieval Times ==
=== Vandal Kingdom ===
- June 533 — March 534 Vandalic War

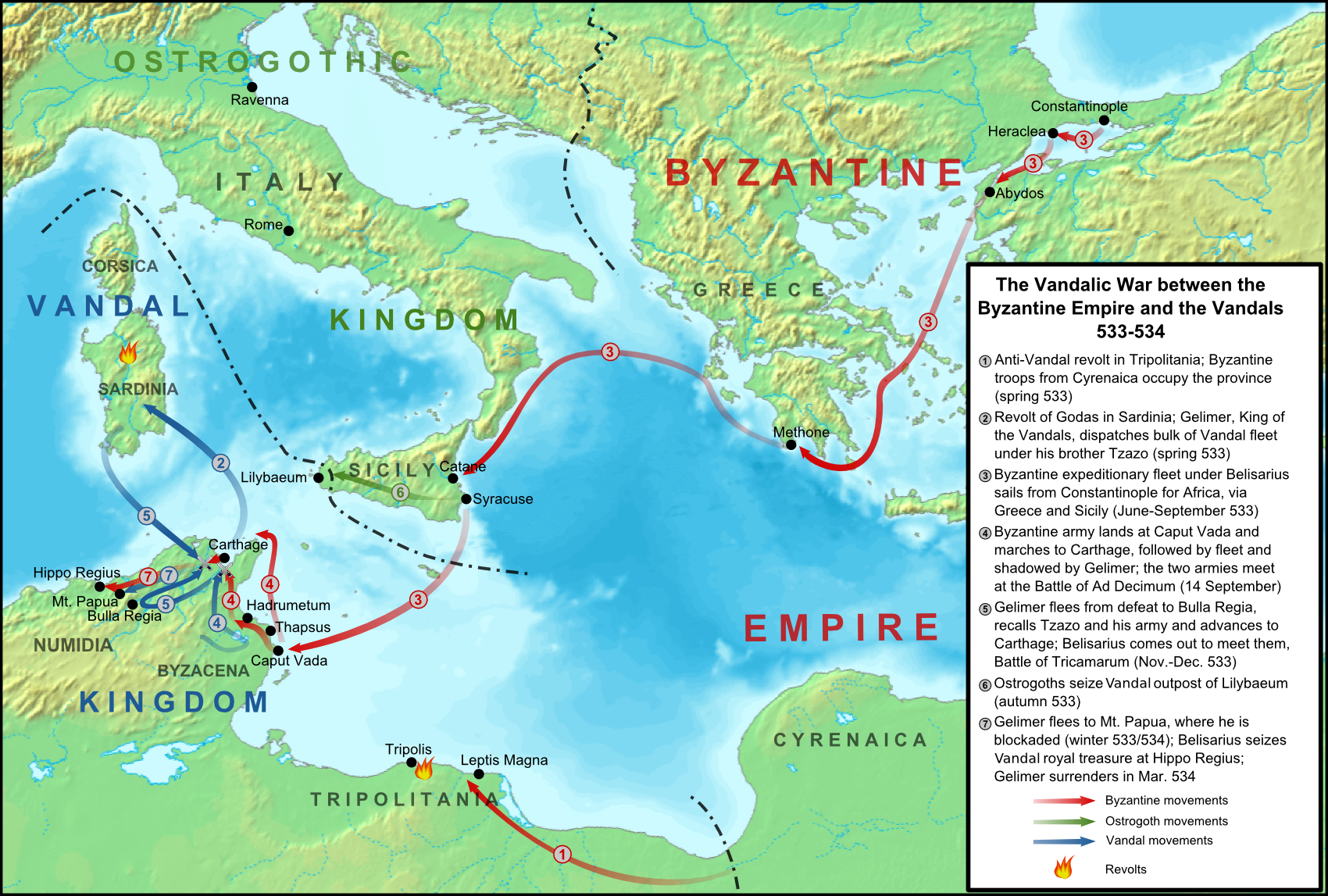
Vandalic War

  - September 13, 533 Battle of Ad Decimum
  - December 15, 533 Battle of Tricamarum

=== Byzantine Praetorian prefecture of Africa ===
- The Moorish Wars
  - 534 First Moorish uprising
  - 536 Military mutiny
  - 544 Second Moorish uprising and the revolt of Guntharic
- 577 Conflict with Moorish kingdom of Garmul

=== Byzantine Exarchate of Africa ===
- 647 — 709 Muslim conquest of the Maghreb

Expansion of Rashidun Caliphate

  - 698 Battle of Carthage

=== Aghlabids ===
- 824–836: military mutiny
- 879–880: Invasion of al-Abbas ibn Ahmad ibn Tulun

=== Fatimid Caliphate ===
- 909: Fatimd conquest of Ifriqiya from the Aghlabids
- 943–947: Rebellion of Abu Yazid

=== Almohad Caliphate ===
- 1160 All of Ifriqiya conquered and annexed by the Almohads

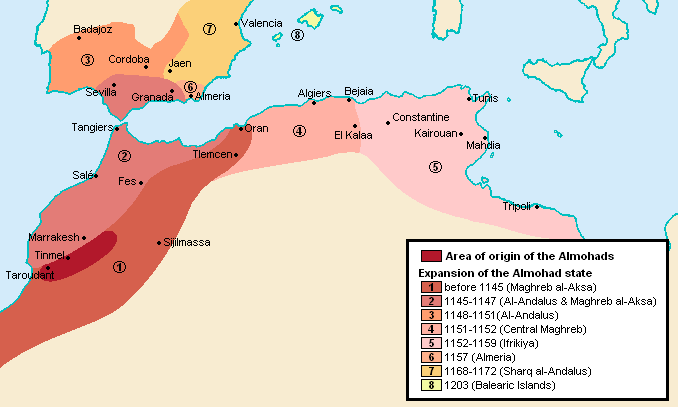
Expansion of the Almohad Caliphate

- 1171 — 1172 Conquest of North Africa and Nubia by the Ayyubid Dynasty

=== Ayyubid dynasty ===
- 1171 — 1172 Conquest of North Africa and Nubia by the Ayyubid Dynasty

=== Hafsid dynasty ===
- 1269 Eighth Crusade

== Modern Times ==
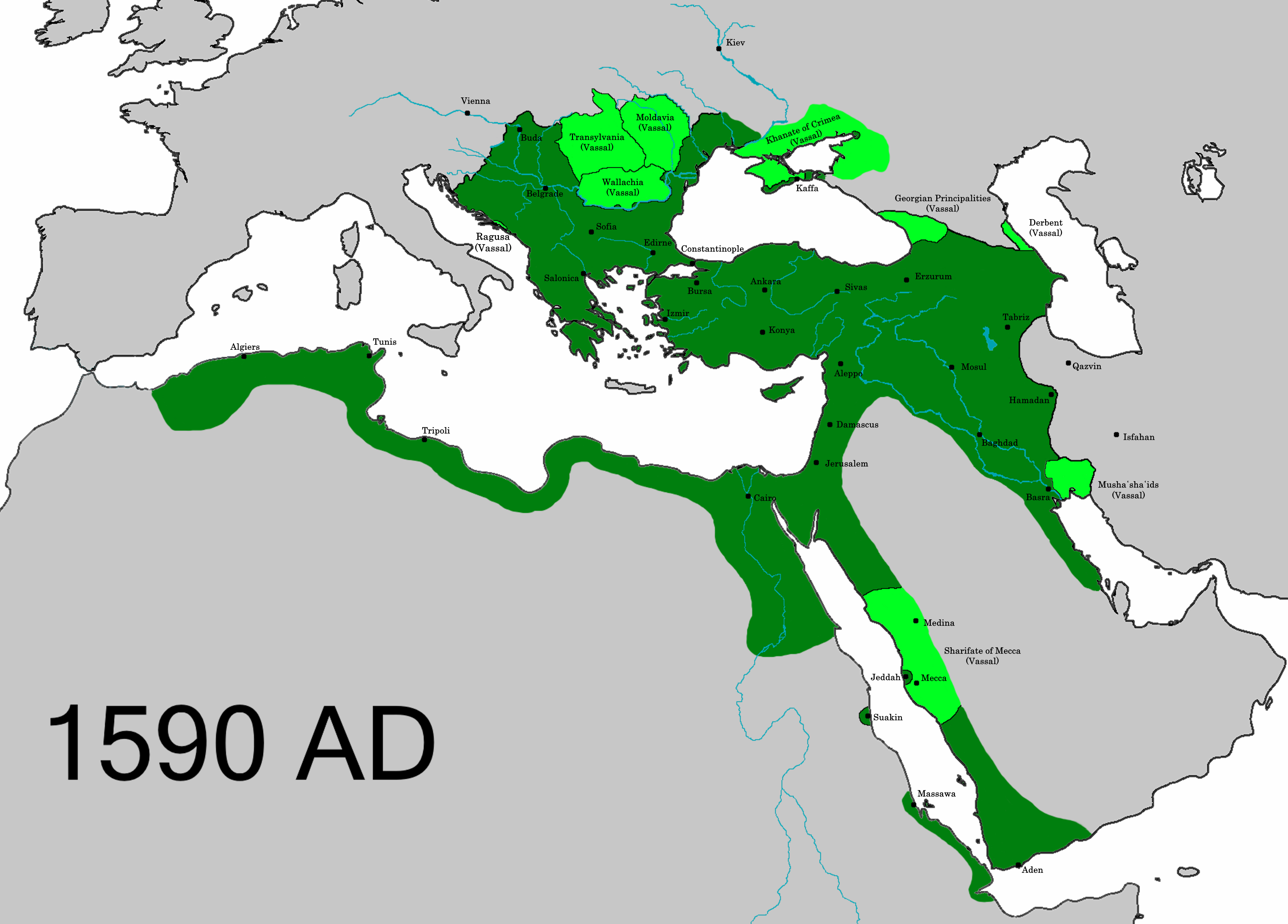
The Ottoman Empire shortly after the annexation of Tunis in 1574.

=== Ottoman Eyalet of Tunus ===
- 1526 — 1791 Ottoman–Habsburg wars
  - August 16, 1534 Conquest of Tunis
  - June 1535 Conquest of Tunis
  - July 12, 1574 — September 13, 1574 Conquest of Tunis

=== French protectorate of Tunisia ===
Expansion of the French Empire

- September 1, 1939 — September 2, 1945 World War II
  - June 10, 1940 — May 2, 1945 Mediterranean and Middle East theatre of World War II
    - June 10, 1940 — May 13, 1943 North African Campaign
      - November 17, 1942 — May 13, 1943 Tunisia Campaign
        - November 10, 1942 — December 25, 1942 Run for Tunis
        - February 1943 — May 1943 Battle of Sedjenane
        - February 14, 1943 — February 17, 1943 Battle of Sidi Bou Zid
        - February 19, 1943 — February 25, 1943 Battle of the Kasserine Pass
        - March 6, 1943 Battle of Medenine
        - March 16, 1943 — March 27, 1943 Operation Pugilist
        - March 23, 1943 — April 3, 1943 Battle of El Guettar
        - April 5, 1943 — April 27, 1943 Operation Flax
        - April 6, 1943 — April 7, 1943 Battle of Wadi Akarit
        - April 22, 1943 — May 1, 1943 Operation Vulcan
        - May 6, 1943 — May 12, 1943 Operation Strike
        - May 8, 1943 — May 13, 1943 Operation Retribution
- 1952 — 1956 Tunisian independence

=== Kingdom of Tunisia ===
- 1952 — 1956 Tunisian independence

=== Republic of Tunisia ===
- July 19, 1961 — July 23, 1961 Bizerte crisis
- December 18, 2010 — January 14, 2011 Tunisian revolution
- June 26, 2015 — 2022 ISIL insurgency in Tunisia

== Sources ==
- Collins, Roger (2000), "Vandal Africa, 429–533", The Cambridge Ancient History. Late Antiquity: Empire and Successors, A.D. 425–600, vol. XIV, Cambridge University Press, pp. 124–126

== See also ==
- Tunisia
- List of wars involving Tunisia
- Tunisian Armed Forces
- Tunisian Land Army
- Tunisian Navy
- Tunisian Air Force
- Military history of Africa
- African military systems to 1,800 C.E.
- African military systems 1,800 C.E. — 1,900 C.E.
- African military systems after 1,900 C.E.
