= Siege of Zama =

Siege in 109 BC

- Part of the Jugurthine War
| Date | 109 BC |
| Location | the city of Zama in Numidia 36°06′43″N 9°17′08″E |
| Result | Numidian victory |

Belligerents
| Roman Republic | Numidia |

Commanders and leaders
| Quintus Caecilius Metellus; Gaius Marius | Jugurtha |

Strength
| 25,000–35,000 | Unknown (probably comparable or larger) |
- Location within Tunisia

The siege of Zama, part of the Jugurthine War, was an investment of the Numidian town of Zama by a Roman army. The Romans were commanded by Quintus Caecilius Metellus, one of the consuls of 109 BC, while the Numidians were under the overall command of Jugurtha, the king of Numidia. The Romans' main objective was to lure Jugurtha into a set-piece battle; the Numidians had been wearing down the Roman legions by guerilla warfare and the Roman commander hoped the siege would pressure the Numidian king into giving battle. Jugurtha did not let himself be goaded into a pitched battle and kept up his opportune attacks while the defenders of Zama kept the Romans at bay. Failing to take the city and failing to provoke the Numidian king into entering a set-piece battle, the Romans gave up on the siege and marched back to the Roman province of Africa.

== Background ==
Numidia between 112 and 105 B.C. and main battles of the war.

King Masinissa of Numidia, who was a steadfast ally of Rome, died in 149, he was succeeded by his son Micipsa, who ruled from 149 to 118 BC. At the time of his death Micipsa had three potential heirs, his two sons, Adherbal and Hiempsal, and an illegitimate nephew, Jugurtha. Jugurtha had fought under Scipio Aemilianus at the siege of Numantia, where he had formed a friendship with Roman aristocrats and learned about Roman society and military tactics. Micipsa, worried that after his death Jugurtha would usurp the kingdom from his own somewhat less able sons, adopted him, and bequeathed the kingship jointly to his two sons and Jugurtha. After Micipsa's death the three kings fell out, and ultimately agreed between themselves to divide their inheritance into three separate kingdoms. When they were unable to agree on the terms of the division Jugurtha declared open war on his cousins. Hiempsal, the younger and braver of the brothers, was assassinated by Jugurtha's agents. Jugurtha gathered an army and marched against Adherbal, who fled to Rome. There he appealed to the Roman Senate for arbitration.

Although the Senate were securities for Micipsa's will, they now allowed themselves to be bribed by Jugurtha into overlooking his crimes, and organized a commission, led by the ex-Consul Lucius Opimius, to fairly divide Numidia between the remaining contestants in 116 BC. Jugurtha bribed the Roman officials in the commission and was allotted the more fertile and populous western half of Numidia, while Adherbal received the east. Powerless Adherbal accepted and peace was made. Shortly after, in 113 BC, Jugurtha again declared war on his brother, and defeated him, forcing him to retreat into Cirta, Adherbal's capital. Adherbal held out for some months, aided by a large number of Romans and Italians who had settled in Africa for commercial purposes. From inside his siege lines, Adherbal appealed again to Rome, and the Senate dispatched a message to Jugurtha to desist. The latter ignored the demand, and the Senate sent a second commission, this time headed by Marcus Scaurus, a respected member of the aristocracy, to threaten the Numidian king into submission. The king, pretending to be open to discussion, protracted negotiations with Scaurus long enough for Cirta to run out of provisions and hope of relief. When Scaurus left without having forced Jugurtha to a commitment, Adherbal surrendered. Jugurtha promptly had him executed, along with the Romans who had joined in the defence of Cirta. But the deaths of Roman citizens caused an immediate furore among the commoners at home, and the Senate, threatened by the popular tribune Gaius Memmius, finally declared war on Jugurtha in 111 BC.

In 111 BC the consul Lucius Calpurnius Bestia commanded a Roman army against Jugurtha, but he allowed himself to be bribed. The following year the consul Spurius Postumius Albinus succeeded the command against the Numidian king, but he let himself be bribed too. Spurius's brother, Aulus Postumius Albinus, allowed Jugurtha to lure him into the desolate wilds of the Sahara, where the cunning Numidian king, who had reportedly bribed Roman officers to facilitate his attack, was able to catch the Romans at a disadvantage. Half the Roman army were killed, and the survivors were forced to pass under the yoke in a disgraceful symbolism of surrender. The Roman Senate, however, when it heard of this capitulation, refused to honour the conditions and continued the war.

After Postumius' defeat, the Senate finally shook itself from its lethargy, appointing as commander in Africa the plebeian noble Quintus Caecilius Metellus, who had a reputation for integrity and courage. Metellus proved the soundness of his judgement by selecting as officers for the campaign men of ability rather than of rank, men like Gaius Marius and Publius Rutilius Rufus. Metellus arrived in Africa as consul in 109 BC and dedicated several months to a serious disciplinary reform of his demoralised forces.

In spring of 109 BC, Metellus led his reorganised army into Numidia; Jugurtha was alarmed and attempted negotiation, but Metellus prevaricated; and, without granting Jugurtha terms, he conspired with Jugurtha's envoys to capture Jugurtha and deliver him to the Romans. The crafty Jugurtha, guessing Metellus' intentions, broke up negotiation and retreated. Metellus followed and crossed the mountains into the desert, advancing to the river Muthul where the Numidians ambushed them. Through the capable leadership of Metellus, Marius and Rutilius Rufus, the Romans were able to escape the ambush at Muthul with a drawn battle.

Seeing that he could not defeat the Romans in a pitched battle Jugurtha changed his strategy; he began employing guerrilla tactics. Jugurtha led an elite cavalry corps to shadow the Romans and harry them whenever it was convenient and opportune. He even resorted to poisoning springs and wasting livestock where he expected the Romans to march. This eventually started to weigh heavily on the legions and their commanders who could not get to grips with their opponents.

Metellus first resorted to ravaging the Numidian countryside hoping to force Jugurtha in the open and into a pitched battle. When it became apparent that this strategy would not yield the right results, Metellus changed strategy again. He hoped he could lure Jugurtha into a set-piece battle by besieging one of Numidia's cities. Metellus gathered his army and started marching towards Zama. Jugurtha had somehow learned about the Roman plans and reinforced the city and prepared the city to withstand a siege.

== Prelude ==
When Metellus arrived at the city he began his siege, he sent one of his legates, Gaius Marius, to commandeer provisions in nearby Sicca. After requisitioning supplies Marius had to fight his way out of Sicca after Jugurtha tried to ambush him while leaving the city.

== Siege ==
While Marius was getting additional provisions, Metellus prepared to assault Zama. Upon the return of Marius, Metellus launched his first attack on the city walls. While slingers laid down covering fire the legionaries attempted to scale the walls with ladders. As the Romans were trying to get over the walls, Jugurtha attacked the Romans camp almost taking it. Metellus sent Marius and his men to reinforce the camps defenders. Eventually, Jugurtha retreated using the nightfall to get his soldiers away safely.

Metellus bolstered his camp's defences and then stormed Zama again. When the second assault was underway Jugurtha's army reappeared and attacked a group of exposed legionaries. The Numidians attacked in an unorthodox fashion by launching their cavalry directly into the Roman lines, followed by their infantry doing the same. While a part of the Roman army was holding off Jugurtha's attack, Marius and his men, seeing that the defenders of Zama were distracted, tried to get a foothold on the walls, but the Numidians reacted in time and his assault was repulsed. Meanwhile, Jugurtha, seeing the Romans were not going to break, had retreated too.

After repeatedly failing to take the city, and Jugurtha's opportune attacks, Metellus decided the siege was not going to yield the required result. The Romans marched back to Africa province, garrisoning and fortifying the Numidian towns they had taken earlier in their campaign.

== Aftermath ==
The war raged on for four more years and it would take treachery not warfare to bring it to a conclusion. Marius had become dissatisfied with his tenure as a legate serving Metellus. He returned to Rome and got himself elected consul. He then introduced a bill which transferred the command of the war against Jugurtha to himself. After returning to Africa, Marius campaigned against Jugurtha with mixed results. Eventually, Marius' subordinate Lucius Cornelius Sulla was able to get Jugurtha's son-in-law king Bocchus of Mauretania to betray the Numidian king. Sulla delivered Jugurtha to Marius and the war came to an end.
