= Siege of Cirta =

111 BCE siege

- Part of Jugurthine War
Date	113–112 BC
Location	Cirta, Numidia 36.3675°N 6.611944°E
Result	Victory for Jugurtha: Jugurtha seizes the Numidian throne

Belligerents
Adherbal loyalists and Roman citizens	Forces under Jugurtha

Commanders and leaders
Adherbal (executed)	Jugurtha

Strength
Unknown	Unknown

Casualties and losses
Garrison massacred	Light

The siege of Cirta was fought between the rival Numidian kings Adherbal and Jugurtha in 113 BC. They were contesting the throne of Numidia after the death of King Micipsa. Jugurtha invaded Adherbal's territory, defeated him and besieged him in his capital Cirta. Two Roman deputations attempted to negotiate a settlement, but Jugurtha ignored them. When the city surrendered he tortured Adherbal to death and executed all who had bourne arms against him, including numerous Romans. This last action was to spark the outbreak of the Jugurthine War between Rome and Numidia.

== Background ==
Numidia, in green, with the position of Cirta shown

Numidia was a kingdom located in North Africa (roughly corresponding to northern modern day Algeria) adjacent to what had been Rome's arch enemy, Carthage. King Masinissa, who was a steadfast ally of Rome in the Third Punic War, died in 149, and was succeeded by his son Micipsa, who ruled from 149 to 118 BC. At the time of his death Micipsa had three potential heirs, his two sons, Adherbal and Hiempsal I, and an illegitimate nephew, Jugurtha. Jugurtha had fought under Scipio Aemilianus at the siege of Numantia, where, through friendship with Roman aristocrats, he had formed an acquaintance with Roman manners and military tactics. Micipsa, worried that at his death Jugurtha would usurp the kingdom from his own somewhat less able sons, adopted him, and bequeathed the kingship jointly to his two sons and Jugurtha. After Micipsa's death the three kings fell out, and ultimately agreed between themselves to divide their inheritance into three separate kingdoms. When they were unable to agree on the terms of the division Jugurtha declared open war on his cousins. Hiempsal, the younger and braver of the brothers, was assassinated by Jugurtha's agents. Jugurtha gathered an army and marched against Adherbal, who fled to Rome. There he appealed to the Roman Senate for arbitration.

Rome dispatched a commission, led by the ex-Consul Lucius Opimius, to deal with the matter, but the senators who comprised it were bribed by Jugurtha into acquitting him of his crime, and equally dividing the disputed kingdom between him and Adherbal. Jugurtha further bribed the commission to grant him the more prosperous western half. In 116, still dissatisfied, Jugurtha attempted to provoke his rival into war by performing repeated cavalry harassments on the frontier. But Adherbal failed to respond and prudently sent a message to Rome to again protest against Jugurtha's conduct. The Senate failed to make any effectual response, and in 113 Jugurtha finally decided to invade his cousin's kingdom in force. Adherbal met him with his scanty forces near Rusicade, and was routed. He retreated with the survivors to his capital, Cirta.

== Siege ==
Cirta was strongly situated on a rising hill with the river Ampsaga looping around its base. The city had a sizable Roman minority, mostly merchants of some standing and their families; these joined the rest of the population in manning the walls and defending the city. Cirta was able to hold out for a long time against the besieging army. Adherbal, before falling back to the town, had sent messengers to Rome to notify the Senate of Jugurtha's invasion. A commission of ten inexperienced Romans was despatched to negotiate with Jugurtha. Jugurtha dismissed them, claiming that Adherbal had attempted to poison him, and they returned to Rome without result. The Senate sent a more senior deputation headed by Marcus Scaurus, one of the most prestigious and influential Roman politicians, to threaten Jugurtha into submission. After a furious but unsuccessful attempt to carry the walls of Cirta before this group's arrival, Jugurtha went to receive the deputation at Utica. A lengthy but inconclusive negotiation ensued, in which Jugurtha went to great lengths to protract the discussions by vague protestations, without actually making any concessions. Scaurus' commission returned to Rome without achieving anything. At this Adherbal, who had run out of provisions, decided to capitulate. The Romans within the walls acquiesced, counting on their immunity as Roman citizens. Adherbal was put to death by slow torture, and every man who had joined in the city's defense, Roman or African, was executed.

== Aftermath ==
The abandonment of a loyal and valuable ally, and the deaths of Roman citizens, led to outrage among the Roman population. This was compounded by the general belief that Scaurus and his retinue, as well as the previous Roman commissions to Jugurtha, had accepted bribes from him. The Senate attempted to suppress the uproar; but Gaius Memmius, tribune-elect for the following year, declared his intention of impeaching the Senators suspected of corruption. The Senate subsequently declared war, starting the Jugurthine War, 111–106 BC. In spite of initial Roman setbacks, Jugurtha was eventually defeated by the capable generals Quintus Metellus Numidicus and Gaius Marius, the last of whom captured Jugurtha and brought him to Rome to die in chains in the Tullianum.
