= Mellègue River =

River in Algeria

Mellègue
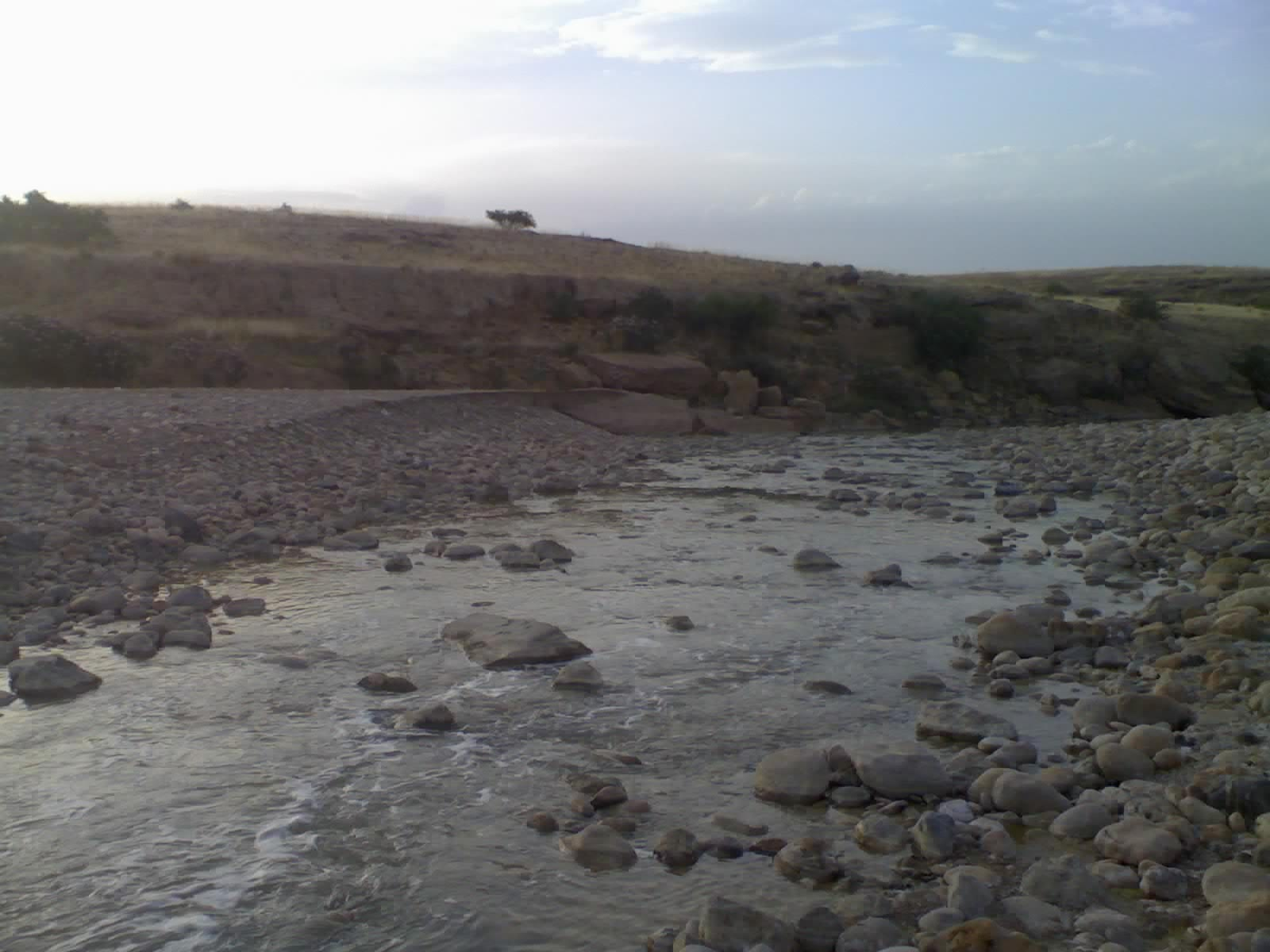
- A view of the Mèllegue River stream

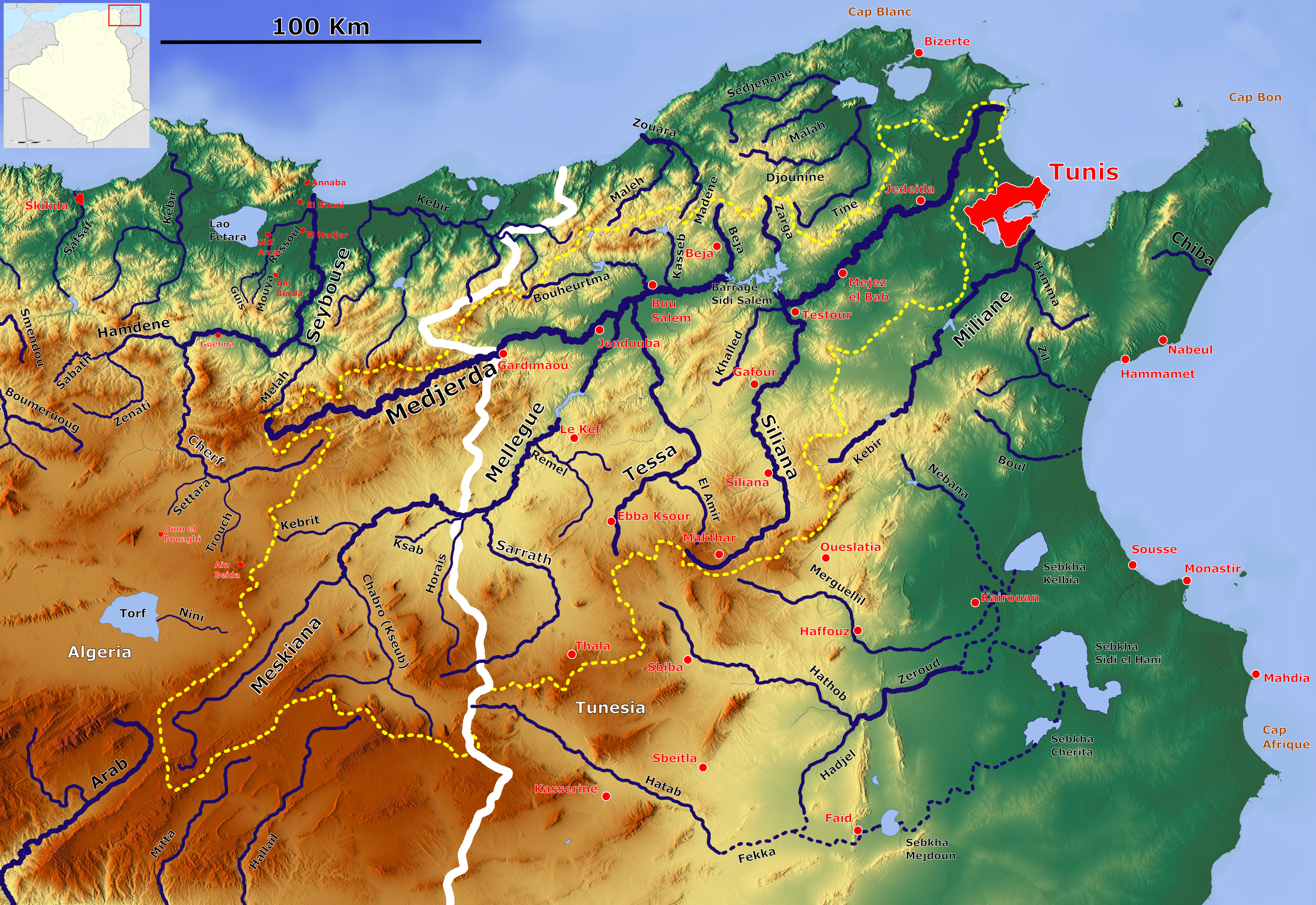
- The Medjerda drainage basin with the Mellègue River (center-left)

Location
- Countries: Algeria and Tunisia

Physical characteristics
- Source
  - location: Chabro River, Algeria
- Mouth
  - location: Medjerda River, Tunisia
  - coordinates: 36°32′05″N 8°50′45″E
- Length: 317 km (197 mi)
- Basin size: 10.790 km^{2} (4.166 mi^{2})

The Mellègue River probably the ancient Muthul, is a river linking Algeria and Tunisia. Its drainage basin originates in the highlands of North-eastern Algeria (within the vicinity of Souk Ahras), with Chabro River in Tébessa serving as one of its most prominent headwater tributaries. The river flows through western Tunisia in the region of El Kef, constituting the primary tributary of the Medjerda River.

== History ==
Mellègue river, known in ancient times as the Muthul River, is a significant historical site deeply associated with ancient warfare. It was the battleground for the Battle of the Muthul during the Jugurthine War, which was fought between the Numidian Kingdom, led by King Jugurtha, and the Roman Republic, led by Consul Metellus and Gaius Marius. The Roman historian Sallust described the region where the battle took place as:

There was in that part of Numidia. a river arising from the South by the name of Muthul, almost twenty miles from which there was a mountain range running parallel to it, desolate of natural growth and human habitation. But as it were out of its midst there arose a hill, extending a great distance and covered with oleaster and myrtle and other sorts of trees And so Jugurtha made camp on that hill,...

— Sallust,

The site played a pivotal role in the outcome of the battle; the Numidians skillfully exploited their precise knowledge of the terrain against the rigid Roman tactics, surrounding the Roman army through long-range skirmishes, sudden engagements, and strategic withdrawals.

During the ancient era, the hydrological system of the Mellègue River basin and its tributaries in eastern Algeria played a vital strategic role, serving as the natural corridor for the ancient road network linking the major Numidian cities. Archaeological surveys indicate that the Roman highway connecting Theveste, Madauros, Tubursicum Numidarum, and Calama strictly followed the geographical axis of the upper Mellègue basin. Originating from Tébessa, the route aligned with the eastern heights of Chabro river a key Algerian tributary of the Mellègue River passing through several ancient stations including Morsott and mount Mukhiriga. The road then crossed to the left bank of the Mellègue River, ascending the arid slopes toward the high plateau of Madauros, which overlooks the Medjerda basin.

== See also ==
- Medjerda River
- Seybouse River
- Battle of the Muthul
