= Battle of Suthul =

Battle of the Jugurthine War

- Part of the Jugurthine War
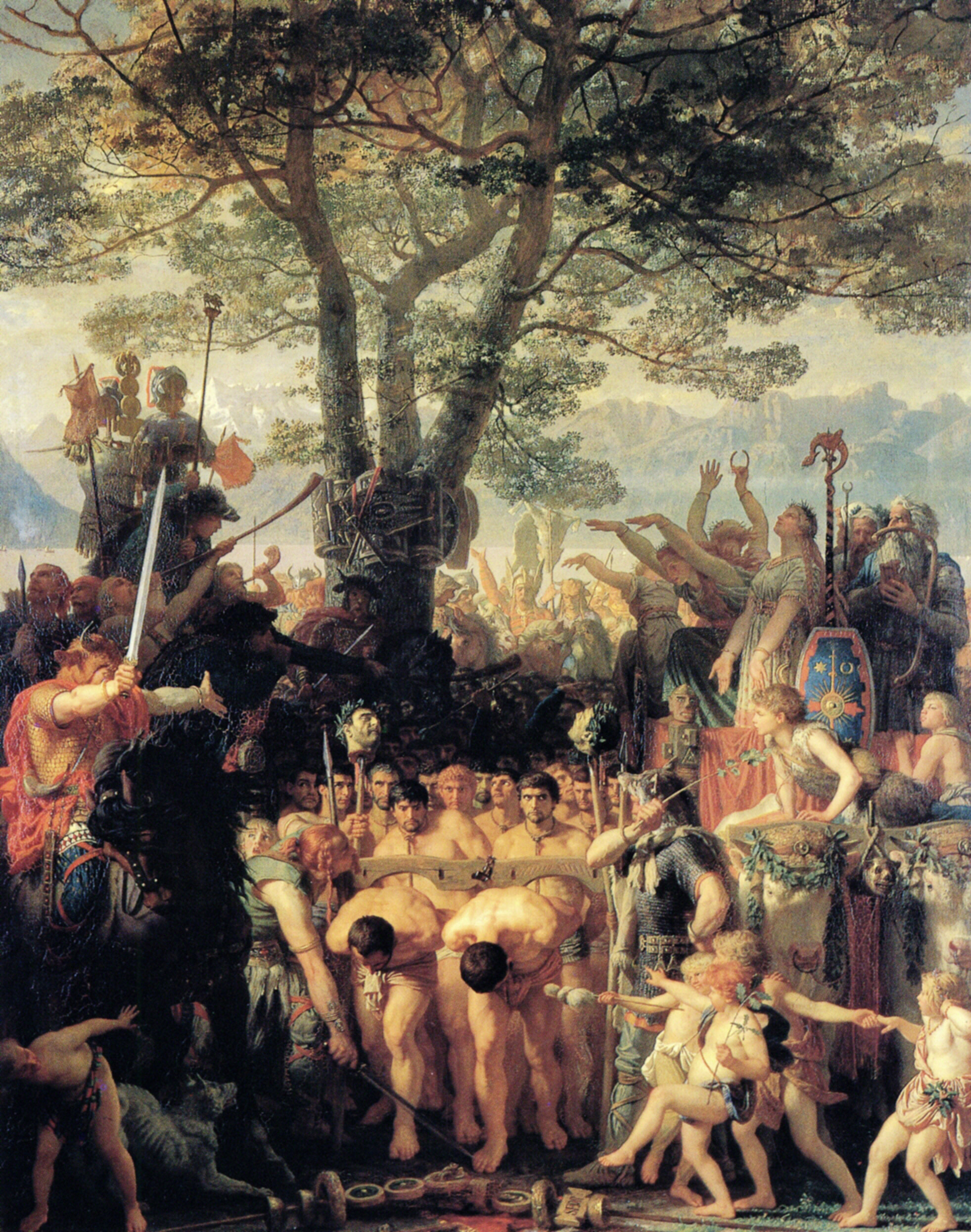
- Romans Under the Yoke, by Gleyre Charles
| Date | 110 BC |
| Location | Suthul, near Calma (present-day Guelma, Algeria) 36.467313°N 7.430052°E |
| Result | Numidian victory; Romans were forced to withdraw from Numidia |

Belligerents
| Kingdom of Numidia | Roman Republic |

Commanders and leaders
| Jugurtha | Aulus Postumius Albinus (surrendered) |

Strength
| Unknown but massive army according to Sallust | 40,000 probably three legions |

Casualties and losses
| Unknown | c. 38,600 captured Defection of a cohort, two squadrons, and a number of soldiers |
- Location within Algeria Battle of Suthul (Mediterranean)

The Battle of Suthul was one of the confrontations of the Jugurthine War. The battle was fought in 110 BC between the Numidian army, led by King Jugurtha, and the Roman forces, led by Aulus Postumius Albinus. The consul Spurius Postumius Albinus invaded Numidia, but left to prepare for the elections in Rome. His brother, Aulus Postumius Albinus, took command of the army, but Jugurtha lured the Romans into a trap siege near the town of Suthul, inflicting a humiliating defeat upon them.

== Background ==
Upon the death of Micipsa, king of Numidia, a war broke out between his successors over the Numidian throne. The policies of Jugurtha were not in the interest of the Romans. Jugurtha led a conflict against his brothers and killed Adherbal and all his followers in a mass massacre, in addition to the Roman community in the city during the siege of Cirta in 112 BC.The Roman reaction came when the Senate declared war against Jugurtha.

In 110 BC, as the elections drew near, the consul Spurius Postumius Albinus returned to Rome, leaving behind his brother Aulus to take command of the camp as praetor. Meanwhile, the Republic was experiencing severe turmoil and sharp disturbances due to the disputes stirred up by the tribunes of the plebs; two of them, P. Lucullus and L. Annius, sought to extend their term in office despite the opposition of all their colleagues, which caused the elections to be postponed for an entire year.

== Location ==
Sallust describes Suthul as a strongly defended settlement built on a steep mountainside, though he does not clearly indicate whether its fortifications stood on the summit or along the slope itself. He further notes that the city was protected by a marshy depression which, during the rainy season, filled with water and formed a natural barrier around the site. Such geographical features can be found at numerous locations in the mountainous regions of northeastern Algeria.

On the other hand, Encyclopédie berbère and Orosius argue that this battle took place in the city of Calama (present-day Guelma in northeastern Algeria), noting that the Numidian treasury was based there. Guelma is located in a mountainous area on the southern bank of the Seybouse River, The surrounding landscape of Calama includes low lying areas that may correspond to the wet terrain described by Sallust. Nevertheless, archaeological remains, including the theater, are situated on the valley floor rather than on an elevated position. This discrepancy has led some scholars to consider whether Calama could be identified with Suthul, although the available evidence remains inconclusive.

== Battle ==
Aulus summoned the soldiers from their winter quarters for a campaign in January, and arrived by forced marches in highly tempestuous weather at the town of Suthul, where the king’s treasures were deposited. The severity of the season, and the natural advantages of the place, rendered its storming or blockade impossible. Nevertheless, either as a pretext to increase the king's panic, or blinded by his zeal to capture the town for the treasures, Aulus brought up mantelts, constructed a rampart, and hastened other measures that would support his enterprise.

Aware of the legate’s lack of skill, Jugurtha craftily fueled his madness, sending a succession of supplicating embassies; and, as if to avoid him, continued to lead his army through forests and bypasses. He lured Aulus with the hope of a secret agreement to leave Suthul and pursue him in his pretended retreat into remote regions. Meanwhile, he employed skillful agents to tamper with the praetor’s army day and night, bribing centurions and squadron commanders, some to desert, and others, at a given signal, to abandon their posts.

When everything was arranged according to his wish, in the dead of night, he suddenly surrounded Aulus’s camp with a multitude of Numidians. The Roman soldiers were panicked by the unusual uproar; some seized their weapons, others sought to hide, and others again tried to encourage their frightened comrades. Confusion was everywhere: the Numidian army was massive, the sky was darkened by night and clouds, and their danger was imminent, making it doubtful whether flight or remaining was the safer option.

Among those having been recently bribed, a cohort of Ligurians, along with two squadrons of Thracians and a few privates, defected to the king. Furthermore, the chief centurion of the Third Legion allowed the Roman force's rampart which he was charged with defending to be breached, and through this route, all the Numidians stormed the camp. Jugurtha captured the Roman army on a neighboring hill in a defeat Sallust described as shameful, after many of them had thrown down their weapons. The night and the plundering of the camp prevented the Numidians from fully exploiting their victory.

The next day, Jugurtha, in a meeting with Aulus, expressed his view that although he held the army in the horrors of famine and the sword, he was still mindful of human vicissitudes. If Aulus agreed to a treaty, his forces would be released entirely unharmed, Jugurtha forced the Romans to pass under the yoke as a sign of submission, with the additional condition that they must evacuate Numidia within ten days. The terms were harsh and ignominious; nevertheless, with the fear of death before their eyes, treaty was concluded according to the king's wishes.

== Aftermath ==
When the news of the defeat reached Rome, fear and grief overwhelmed the state. Some mourned the glory of their empire, while others, ignorant of military affairs, feared for their freedom. Everyone, especially those who had frequently earned distinction in war, felt bitter toward Aulus because, despite possessing weapons, he had sought safety in disgrace rather than by the sword. The consul Albinus, fearing both the public animosity and the subsequent danger arising from his brother's misconduct, consulted the Senate regarding the peace.

Meanwhile, he mobilized reinforcements for the Roman army, summoned units from the allies and Latin citizens, and indeed displayed activity in every possible way. The Senate, as had been its duty from the beginning, decreed that without its consent and that of the people, no agreement could have the binding force of a treaty. Although the consul was forbidden by the tribunes of the people from taking the troops he had raised with him, he nevertheless set out for Africa a few days later.
