= Lucius Appuleius Saturninus =

Roman populist and tribune (died 100 BC)

Lucius Appuleius Saturninus (133 or 132 BC – September or October 100 BC) was a Roman Republican politician. He is best known for his violent populist rhetoric and tactics as plebeian tribune in 103 and 100 BC. Alienated from the ruling aristocracy by his replacement as curator of grain supplies, he attempted in his first tribunate to pass legislation to reduce the price of subsidised grain at the capital. Unable to secure passage due to a competing proposal to buy grain to ease a current shortage, he brought legislation to establish a permanent court to try treason charges and establish colonies for Gaius Marius' Jugurthine War veterans.

After his tribunate he was prosecuted in court and almost expelled from the senate. Escaping conviction and expulsion, he then joined a political alliance with Gaius Servilius Glaucia. At the tribunician elections of 101 BC, he and Glaucia murdered one of the tribunes-designate so to secure Saturninus' election to the tribunician college of 100 BC. In this second tribunate, he allied with the sitting consul Marius to secure land grants for Marius' Cimbrian War veterans and the banishment of Marius' political enemy Quintus Caecilius Metellus Numidicus.

At the consular elections in December 100 BC, he arranged for the murder of one of the consular candidates for the benefit of his political ally Glaucia. In the turmoil that followed, he attempted an occupation of the Capitoline Hill. But Marius, tasked by a senatus consultum ultimum to quiet the disorder, raised troops near the city and invested Saturninus' position on the Capitoline. After a short siege, Saturninus was arrested and imprisoned in the curia Hostilia. A hostile mob surrounded and stormed the curia, killing Saturninus and the other men imprisoned there.

== Career ==
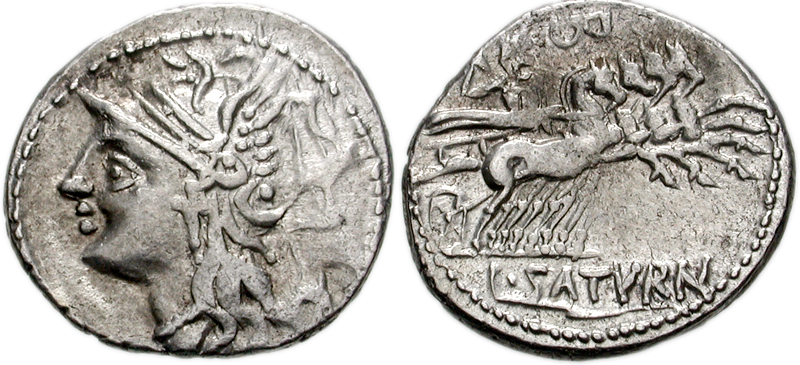
Coin of Lucius Appuleius Saturninus, depicting Roma

His first known magistracy was the quaestorship, in 105 or 104 BC, with most scholars now settling on 104 based on historical context (contemporaneous reports of a grain shortage) and numismatic evidence. The argument that he held the quaestorship in 105 BC is largely based on the constitutional argument that he could not have announced his candidacy as a serving quaestor. However, if elections for the tribunate occurred between 5–9 December 104 BC, his quaestorship would have by that point expired and he would have then assumed the tribunate within days of his election.

During his quaestorship he was assigned the task of arranging the transport of grain from Ostia up the River Tiber to Rome. But amid a rise in grain prices caused by a slave revolt in Sicily, the senate reassigned the task from him to the aged and influential princeps senatus Marcus Aemilius Scaurus. While some sources such as Diodorus Siculus report that he was removed for incompetence or negligence, the gravity of the grain shortage itself could have caused his duties to be transferred to a more senior man. He may also have been dismissed for insubordination, as he is recorded as having minted coins to defray expenses without senatorial authorisation. The exact cause aside, Saturninus felt that he had been rebuked and repositioned himself in an anti-senatorial political position.

=== First tribunate ===
Elected to the plebeian tribunate of 103 BC, he likely sought to build support among the urban poor (the plebs urbana) by bringing a grain bill early in his term. The bill sought an unprecedentedly large subsidy for grain purchases at Rome, set at an eighth of the Gracchan-era subsidised price. The costs of the proposal immediately raised attention and one of the serving urban quaestors reported, whether falsely or otherwise is not known, that the treasury would not be able to bear such expenses; the senate then voted that bringing the proposal before the people would be against the interests of the republic. Although Saturninus moved for a vote on his proposal anyway, his legislative assembly was disrupted by violence. The senate instead, based on numismatic evidence, ordered coining of money to pay for the purchase of grain from abroad, which likely won the senatorial leaders around Scaurus support among the urban poor.

Seeking instead to find support among the rural plebs, he then proposed two laws: one to distribute lands to Gaius Marius' veterans from the Jugurthine war (though this law may instead date to 100 BC) and another to establish a permanent tribunal for treason charges. He also likely brought successful legislation to exile the ex-consul Gnaeus Mallius Maximus. The Jugurthine land bill, if passed this year, won him considerable popularity among Marius' veterans, who were likely still encamped around Italy pending possible remobilisation to fight the Cimbri. Archaeological evidence of colonies in Africa for Marian veterans have been dated with some dispute to shortly after 103 BC. He also found a man called Equitius to pose as the biological son of Tiberius Gracchus in an effort to associate himself with the Gracchi. Definitely of low status and possibly a freedman, when this Equitius was presented before the censor Quintus Caecilius Metellus Numidicus for registration, Numidicus refused to enrol him and pronounced him a fraud, triggering violent protests.

After his tribunate, he was prosecuted for having mistreated ambassadors from the Pontic kingdom of Mithridates. His popularity at this point was likely at an ebb, leaving him open to prosecution. Painting himself as a victim of a powerful corrupt clique in the senate, was able to build up enough support to secure an acquittal. Numidicus, as censor, also attempted to expel him and his buddying political ally Gaius Servilius Glaucia from the senate but was stopped by his censorial colleague. Glaucia was elected in 101 BC to the plebeian tribunate and arranged the assassination of one of the tribunes-designate so that Saturninus could be elected in the now vacated place. Appian's report that Saturninus would have lost but for the assassination of the tribune-designate, one Aulus Nonius, may suggest that Saturninus' popularity among the electorate was weak.

=== Second tribunate ===
Upon his entrance to the tribunate of 100 BC, he formed a political alliance with Gaius Marius, then returning from victory in the Cimbrian War. In support of Marius, Saturninus proposed legislation to establish new colonies to reward Marius' veterans in Cisalpine Gaul and also outside of Italy. It also gave Marius the power to extend the citizenship to recipients so to allow them to settle on the Roman lands they received. The provisions allowing for the extension of the citizenship further inflamed the plebs urbana, always jealous of their citizen privileges, against Saturninus; to secure the passage of the law, Saturninus had to send messengers into the countryside to organise Marian veterans to come to the city. Ignoring contrary omens and rallying a mob to defeat the urban crowd's attempt to disrupt his voting assembly, his rural plebs and veterans forced the urban plebs out and passed the law, probably in January or March.

One of the clauses of the law required all senators to swear an oath to uphold the law. Numidicus, who refused to swear the oath, possibly on grounds that it was passed by violence or procedurally deficient, left for exile. Numidicus, a friend of the urban plebs, may have withdrawn from the city to spare it further fighting between rural and urban factions. Regardless, Saturninus moved legislation to send Numidicus into exile by denying him fire and water (Latin: aquae et ignis interdictio). He did not engage in any other legislative activities for the year, possibly due to his mass of supporters among the rural plebs having returned to their farms, but was able to secure a third term as tribune at the tribunician elections.

=== Death ===
The date of Saturninus' death is disputed. If Appian is to be believed, it occurred on 10 December, the day on which he was to enter a third plebeian tribunate and a day after the consular comitia for that year. The dating of the death to December is unlikely: Appian is ignorant of the delay between election and inauguration; consular elections in December are too late; the afternoon when the riot was suppressed was hot, unlikely in December; Equitius, who had also won election as tribune for 99 BC, according to other sources had not yet come into office; and one Saufeius was still quaestor, meaning that 5 December had not yet passed. A date in September or October 100 BC is more likely.

==== Reconstructions ====
The inciting incident of the riot was Saturninus' occupation of the Capitoline Hill after the killing of one of the candidates in the consulship of that year, the former rabble-rousing tribune of 111 BC, Gaius Memmius. There are two major reconstructions of the events. The first is based on the narrative from Appian and the Livian tradition (represented by Florus, the Periochae, and Orosius). The second is a deduced reconstruction of events by the classicist Ernst Badian.

In Appianic and Livian traditions, after Marcus Antonius is elected as consul-designate, Saturninus and Glaucia summon their supporters to disrupt the electoral assembly. In Appian, this is because it appears that Memmius is to win and therefore preclude Glaucia from becoming consul. They therefore murder him to prevent him from securing that slot. Afterwards, with the urban plebs gathering to kill Saturninus in retribution, they flee to and fortify themselves upon the Capitoline. It is claimed that he was then there proclaimed rex and imperator by his followers, both of which are almost certainly inventions from a hostile tradition.

The narrative from Appian and Livy is problematic and has been challenged as contradictory with Cicero's descriptions, generally of higher quality, of the same events. In Badian's reconstruction, Saturinius' ally Glaucia, one of the sitting praetors, had sought to offer himself as a candidate for the consulship. Gaius Marius, who was to be president of the consular comitia, refused on the grounds of illegality; moreover, a constellation of Glaucia as consul with Saturninus and Equitius as tribunes would be politically unacceptable for Marius and the aristocracy whose approval he was courting. The occupation of the hill was meant to secure the voting location so to induce an assembly to pass a plebiscitum directing Marius to accept Glaucia's candidature. However, since the day for the elections had already been set, no legislation could be moved. Saturninus and Glaucia therefore conspired to incite a riot: it would disrupt the elections, allowing them to pass their bill; and also it would create an opportunity to kill Memmius, who was a political rival. Believing that Marius would do nothing due to their status as sitting magistrates and his unwillingness to intervene after they killed Aulus Nonius at the tribunician elections the previous year, they did not believe there would be a serious response to their tactics.

==== Surrender and death ====
Whatever motives Saturninus and Glaucia had, after a battle in the forum and their occupation of the Capitoline, their actions had clearly gone too far. Appian describes the urban plebs, enemies of Saturninus and friends of Memmius, as already gathering to storm the hill and lynch Saturninus and Glaucia. The senate also resolved decisively in favour of police action against the murderers. Marcus Aemilius Scaurus, still princeps senatus, played a central role in corralling opinion at a senate meeting towards a senatus consultum ultimum. Marius, hesitating likely due to the unprecedented actions he was to perform, conducted a short levy of the urban citizenry, likely including his own veterans, and gave a speech which was successful in dispersing many of Saturninus' rural supporters. They then surrounded the Capitoline and cut the water supply to the hill.

With shortage of water and surrounded by armed troops, Saturninus and his supporters surrendered. Faced with demands to execute the seditiosi, Marius instead promised safety pending trial and moved them to the senate house in the forum, the curia Hostilia. However, an urban mob – while some senators participated it is not clear that the ruling oligarchy organised the mob – stormed the senate house and with tiles killed Saturninus and his allies.

== Family ==
His grandfather was probably the Lucius Appuleius Saturninus who was praetor in 166 BC. Saturninus also had a brother, one Gnaeus Cornelius Dolabella, who was killed amid the disturbances of 100 BC as well. Klaus Zmeskal's Adfinitas (2009) does not list any other family members. The Appuleia who was the wife of Marcus Lepidus, the consul of 78 BC, was a relative.

== Legacy ==
In the immediate aftermath of the uprising, Saturninus' reputation was in tatters. His ally Publius Furius, a man from a obscure background likely elected due to his support of Saturninus' programme, defected and in the immediate aftermath of the uprising enacted the confiscation of Saturninus and his political allies' property. Saturninus' colonial laws may have been annulled due to their passage by violence. However, there is strong evidence of colonial settlement in Gaul after 100 BC along with settlement of Marian veterans in Africa. If the senate decreed the implementation of the lex Appuleia's colonial scheme, it was not fully implemented.

Public opinion continued to be negative in the aftermath of Saturninus' death, with politicians who expressed their sympathies for Saturninus' activities suffering politically. Only in the decades after his death was his reputation rehabilitated as a victim of repression, with the divisive nature of his politics splitting urban and rural plebs from each other glossed over by time.

== Bibliography ==
=== Modern sources ===
- Badian, Ernst (1984). "The death of Saturninus" (PDF). Chiron. 14: 101–47.
- Badian, Ernst (2012). "Appuleius Saturninus, Lucius". Oxford Classical Dictionary (4th ed.). Oxford University Press. doi:10.1093/acrefore/9780199381135.013.624.
- Beness, J L (1991). "The urban unpopularity of Lucius Appuleius Saturninus". Antichthon. 25: 33–62. doi:10.1017/S0066477400000617. ISSN 0066-4774.
- Broughton, Thomas Robert Shannon (1951). The magistrates of the Roman republic. Vol. 1. New York: American Philological Association.
- Broughton, Thomas Robert Shannon (1952). The magistrates of the Roman republic. Vol. 2. New York: American Philological Association.
- Broughton, Thomas Robert Shannon (1986). The magistrates of the Roman republic. Vol. 3. Atlanta, GA: Scholars Press.
- Golden, Gregory K (2013). Crisis management during the Roman republic. Cambridge University Press. ISBN 978-1-107-05590-2. OCLC 842919750.
- Hands, A R (1972). "The date of Saturninus' corn bill". Classical Review. 22 (1): 12–13. doi:10.1017/S0009840X00231727. ISSN 1464-3561.
- Roselaar, Saskia T (2010). Public land in the Roman republic: a social and economic history of ager publicus in Italy, 396-89 BC. Oxford: Oxford University Press. ISBN 978-0-19-957723-1. OCLC 520714519.
- Seager, Robin (1967). "The date of Saturninus' murder". Classical Review. 17 (1): 9–10. doi:10.1017/S0009840X00322958. ISSN 1464-3561.
- Sumner, G V (1973). The orators in Cicero's Brutus: prosopography and chronology. Heritage. University of Toronto Press. JSTOR 10.3138/j.ctvcj2j22.
- Zmeskal, Klaus (2009). Adfinitas (in German). Vol. 1. Passau: Verlag Karl Stutz. ISBN 978-3-88849-304-1.

=== Ancient sources ===
- Appian. Bella civilia.
- Cicero. De haruspicum responso.
- Cicero. Pro Balbo.
- Cicero. Pro Sestio.
- Cicero. Pro Rabirio perduellionis reo.
- Diodorus Siculus. Bibliotheca historica.
- Florus. Epitome.
- Frontinus. Strategemata.
- Granius Licinianus. Reliquiae.
- Livy. Periochae.
- Plutarch. Marius.
- Sallust. Historiae.
- Valerius Maximus. Facta et dicta memorabilia.
