= La Seybouse =

Defunct Algerian newspaper

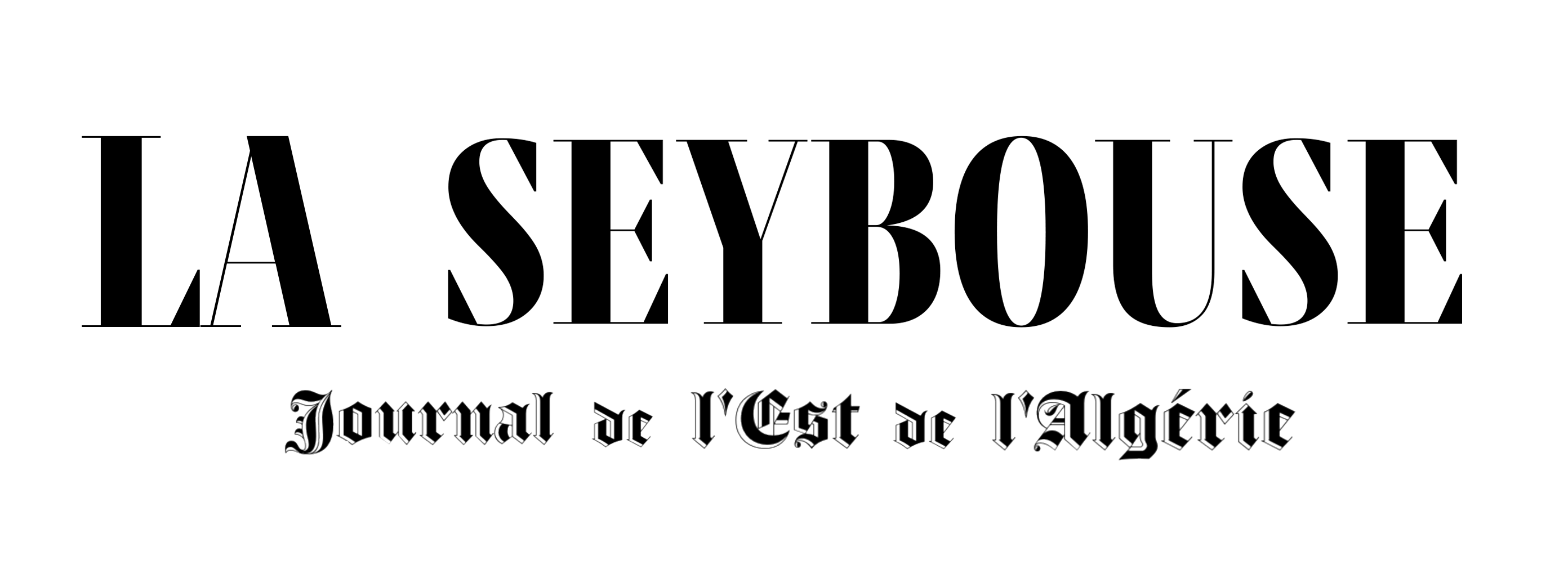
- Owner: Imprimerie de Dagand
- Founder: Jean-François Dagand
- Founded: July 4, 1843
- Ceased publication: 1887
- Language: French
- City: Bône (Annaba)
- Country: Algeria

La Seybouse is a former biweekly newspaper created by Jean-François Dagand on 4 July 1843, in Bône, which is now known as Annaba in Algeria. Published by Dagand's Printing Press, it is considered one of the first newspapers to have been published in Algeria. The newspaper ceased publication in 1887.

== History ==
=== Creation ===
The newspaper La Seybouse is a former biweekly newspaper created by Jean-François Dagand, born in Chambéry on June 12, 1805. At the age of 37, in 1842, he settled in Bône (now Annaba) in Algeria, where he established a printing press named "Imprimerie de Dagand" in 1842, which later published the newspaper.

The following year, on July 4, 1843, he published the first issue of La Seybouse, a title chosen in reference to the river that flows through the city of Bône. The newspaper covered news from eastern Algeria, particularly the city where it was published. According to historian David Prochaska, the newspaper was one of the first to be established in Algeria, notably being the second to be founded.

=== Content and Format ===
The newspaper is printed on four pages in M. 32 format (32 cm x 24 cm), with each page divided into three columns.

The newspaper is published twice a month, with variable dates, including the 4th, 14th, and 24th of each month. The annual subscription cost was 14 francs.

The fourth page of the newspaper is exclusively dedicated to legal, judicial, administrative, and commercial advertisements, as well as civil status bulletins. It also publishes lists of arrivals and departures of passengers, market prices, and ship movements.

=== Newspaper Closure ===
Dagand, the owner and printer of the newspaper, led it until his death on March 14, 1877. After his passing, his nephew, Emile Thomas, succeeded him as the head of the printing press and the newspaper.

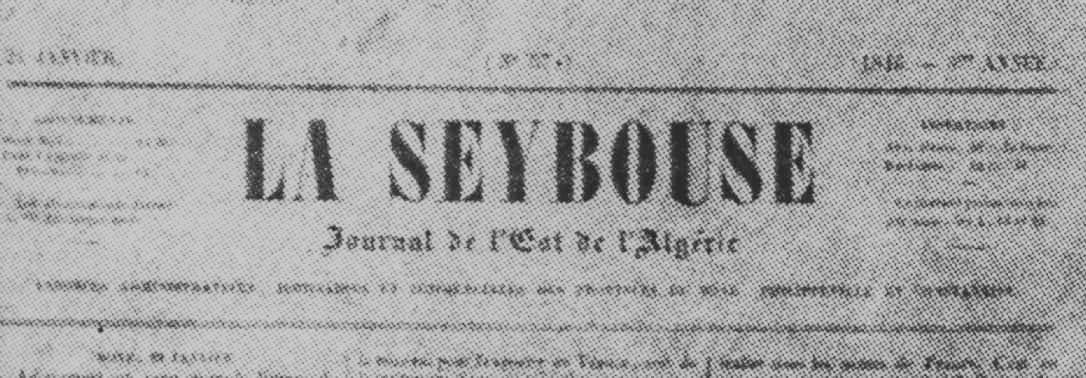
La Seybouse newspaper.

The newspaper La Seybouse saw the collaboration of Albert Fournier, cousin of Eugène Spuller, from 1872 to 1886. After this period, in 1886, he was appointed editor-in-chief of the newspaper La Démocratie Algérie

nne before his death in 1890.

Nevertheless, Emile Thomas who continue to lead "Imprimerie de Dagand", religiously submitted an occasional issue to the Bône court every year for a long time to maintain ownership rights to the title, before the newspaper definitively disappeared in 1887.
