= Jean-François Dagand =

- Born: June 12, 1805; Chambéry
- Died: March 14, 1877 (aged 71); Bône (Annaba)
- Occupation: Printer
- Spouse: Begaud Marie Marguerite

Jean-François Dagand was a French publisher and printer born on June 12, 1805, in Chambéry, France. He died on March 14, 1877, in Bône, which is now known as Annaba in Algeria. He was the creator of the newspaper La Seybouse in 1843.

== Biography ==
Jean-François Dagand was born on June 12, 1805, in Chambéry, France. He worked as a laborer in various workshops in Savoie. At the age of 37, in 1842, he settled in Bône, now known as Annaba, Algeria, where he became a printer and established a printing press called "Imprimerie de Dagand." He also published his newspaper, La Seybouse, which he founded in 1843. He was also a member of several beneficial societies in Bône.

In 1848, Jean-François Dagand obtained all the rights of a French citizen through a decree signed on April 13, 1848, by the Minister of Justice.

Jean-François Dagand married Begaud Marie Marguerite, but she died in 1872. He continued to manage the newspaper and printing press until his death on March 14, 1877. After his passing, his nephew, Emile Thomas, succeeded him as the head of the printing press and newspaper.
