= Battle of the Muthul =

Battle of the Jugurthine War

- Part of the Jugurthine War
Date	109 BC
Location	Muthul river, probably (present-day Mellègue River, Algeria and Tunisia)
Result	Strategic victory for Numidia; Roman retreat

Belligerents
Kingdom of Numidia	Roman Republic

Commanders and leaders
Jugurtha; Bomilcar	Quintus Caecilius Metellus; Gaius Marius; Publius Rutilius Rufus

Strength
20,000 (light infantry, Numidian cavalry); 44 War elephants	65,000—70,000 (heavy infantry, heavy and light cavalry, archers, slingers) five legions

Casualties and losses
Low	High

The Battle of the Muthul took place in 109 BC at the Muthul River in Numidia, as part of the Jugurthine War. The Numidian army, led by King Jugurtha, confronted a Roman army commanded by Consul Quintus Caecilius Metellus, who was assisted by Gaius Marius and Publius Rutilius Rufus. The battle was not decisive in the course of the war; however, it was characterized by its extreme complexity due to the differing military strategies and tactics employed by the Numidians and the Romans.

The Muthul River ran through Adherbal's old kingdom in eastern Numidia. It has been identified as the Wäd Mellag, and in this case Metellus would have started his campaign in south-east Numidia, with the aim of strengthening his communication links. Other views (Mannert and Forbiger) identify the Muthul with the river Ubus, with Metellus starting his campaign in western Numidia, and later returning to Zama.

== Location ==
The Romans assembled the largest possible number of forces of every kind, and through unknown routes, Metellus's army entered that part of Numidia which Adherbal had received at the time of the partition. There was a river named Muthul, flowing from the south. About twenty miles from this river, and in the same direction, stretched a range of mountains, barren and uncultivated. Almost in its center, a hill rose, extending to a vast distance, covered with wild olive, myrtle, and other kinds of trees that grow in dry and sandy soil. Between the hills and the river Muthul, there was a plain, arid due to the lack of water, except in the vicinity of the river, which was planted with trees and crowded with cattle and inhabitants.

== Preparations ==
On the hill, which lay at a right angle to the road, Jugurtha took his position in a highly extended line. He gave Bomilcar the command of the elephants and a part of his infantry, instructing him on what to do, while he himself remained at a point closer to the mountain with the entire force of the cavalry and the elite infantry, stationing his men there. Then, he visited the various squadrons and cohorts, urging them to remember their ancient valor and victory. He said that the men they had to fight against were those whom they had previously defeated and forced under the yoke in the Battle of Suthul, and although they had changed their commander, they had not changed their spirit. He ordered them to maintain the high ground, stating that their knowledge of the terrain would balance out the Roman's inexperience, and they would not join the conflict as a weaker force against a stronger one, or as raw recruits against men more seasoned in war. Therefore, he said, they must be alert and ready to spring upon the Romans at the given signal.

While Jugurtha was occupied with these preparations, Metellus was seen descending the mountain with his army, unaware of the presence of the Numidian forces. At first, he was puzzled by the strange appearance of the area; the cavalry and the Numidians had taken their positions among the bushes, and due to the low height of the trees, they were not entirely hidden, yet it was difficult to distinguish them, as both their bodies and military standards were camouflaged, whether by design or by the nature of their position. However, he soon discovered the ambush and ordered a brief halt. He then changed his formation on the right flank, which was closest to the enemy, and drew up his line with a triple reserve, distributed accordingly.

Metellus distributed the slingers and archers among the cohorts, and placed all his cavalry on the flanks. After a few words of encouragement appropriate for his soldiers, he led his forces in their new formation, with the front ranks at a right angle to the line of march, descending to the level ground. Observing that the Numidians remained stationary and did not come down the hill, and fearing that in that season, given the scarcity of water, his army would be exhausted by thirst, he sent ahead his lieutenant, Publius Rutilius Rufus, with some light cohorts and a detachment of the cavalry toward the river, to secure a position for establishing a camp. He anticipated that the enemy would impede his advance with frequent attacks and flank maneuvers, attempting to see if the fatigue and thirst of his soldiers would work to their advantage. He then made a gradual advance, as far as his means and circumstances permitted, in the same order in which he had descended the hill. Marius was in the rear, commanding the troops facing the enemy, while he himself was with the cavalry on the left flank, which, in the new order of march, had become the vanguard.

== Battle ==
As soon as the king Jugurtha noticed that the rear of Metellus’s army had passed his front ranks, he moved quickly to occupy the hill from which the Romans had descended, deploying a force of about 2,000 soldiers to cut off their line of retreat and prevent the adversaries from later using the site as a stronghold. Following this, Jugurtha gave the signal for a surprise attack, and the Numidian forces surged toward the Roman army; some Numidian detachments severed the Roman rear lines, while others launched assaults from both flanks, effectively surrounding the Roman army and pressuring it from all sides.

The Roman ranks were shattered at various points, and those soldiers who resisted faced extreme difficulty due to the unconventional nature of the battle, as they were bombarded from a distance without any ability to strike back or close in on their attackers. Furthermore, the Numidian cavalry followed strict instructions not to retreat as a single block when pursued by Roman squadrons; instead, they dispersed as widely as possible, leveraging their numerical superiority to re-encircle the pursuers from behind and from the flanks the moment the Roman military organization broke. When retreating toward the hill, the Numidian horses accustomed to such terrain navigated smoothly through the brushwood, whereas the Roman horses stumbled due to the ruggedness of the ground.

Chaos and confusion dominated the course of the battle due to its shifting and indecisive nature; soldiers became separated from their units, and the lines of retreat and pursuit became entangled without any adherence to military standards, as every soldier stood his ground to face the immediate danger. Swords, spears, cavalry, and infantry clashed in a complete absence of organized plans and military orders, and this situation persisted for a quarter of the day without resolution.

As exhaustion and heat intensified, Metellus noticed a decline in the intensity of the Numidian attacks. He moved to gradually rally his forces and reorganize the ranks, dispatching four legionary cohorts to confront the exhausted Numidian infantry stationed on the high ground. Metellus urged his soldiers to stand firm, reminding them that there was no fortified camp to retreat to and that their hopes rested entirely on their weapons. On the other side, Jugurtha continued his movements to encourage his men and renew the assaults of the battle with the support of his elite, utilizing long range skirmishing tactics against those holding their ground and pressing hard against those retreating.

Sallust views both Jugurtha and Metellus as highly capable in managing the confrontation, yet their resources were unequal; Metellus relied on the efficiency of his forces despite the topographical obstacles, while Jugurtha capitalized on the suitability of the terrain despite the disparity in the quality of his fighters. Ultimately, the Romans realized that a decisive blow was inevitable given the Numidians' avoidance of regular warfare. Thus, they stormed the hill toward evening, scattering the Numidian forces stationed there, whose speed and familiarity with the area contributed to their survival.

On another front, Bomilcar appointed by Jugurtha as commander of the elephants and infantry led his forces toward the plain as soon as the Roman officer Publius Rutilius Rufus passed by. He advanced toward the river where Rutilius had been dispatched, forming his lines tightly to monitor the movements of the Roman army. Upon learning that Rutilius’s forces had encamped and let their guard down, and as the rising din of Jugurtha’s battle reached his ears, Bomilcar feared that the Roman lieutenant might notice and move to reinforce Metellus's beleaguered forces. Consequently, Bomilcar extended his military lines to block the Romans' path and advanced toward their camp.

The Roman forces noticed a thick cloud of dust, initially concealed by the trees, which they first mistook for a sandstorm before realizing its steady advance resembled an army deployed for battle. The Romans rushed to arm themselves and took up positions in front of the camp. When the distance closed, the two armies collided amidst deafening shouts.

The Numidians held their ground as long as they could rely on the support of the elephants. However, once those elephants became entangled in tree branches and surrounded, the Numidian forces retreated toward the hill, taking advantage of the falling night, and most of them survived. Despite being exhausted from marching and fighting, the Roman forces moved to link up with Metellus, remaining on high alert for fear of Numidian ambushes. Due to the darkness of the night, the mutual approach of the two armies caused a panic, as each mistook the other for the enemy. A catastrophic friendly fire clash was narrowly averted only when the reconnaissance cavalry discovered the truth.

== Aftermath ==
Jugurtha disbanded most of his troops and skilfully and successfully reverted to guerilla warfare. Hearing of the Battle of the Muthul and Metellus' subsequent manoeuvres against Numidian cities, Romans back home applauded Metellus' performance:

great joy was manifested at Rome when intelligence was received of the success of Metellus; how he had conducted himself and his army according to the ancient discipline; and had, by his bravery, come off victorious, though under the disadvantage of situation [...]. The senate, therefore, appointed public thanksgivings and oblations to the immortal gods for the success of their arms. The city, before full of anxiety for the event of the war, was now filled with joy, and nothing was to be heard but the praises of Metellus.

Metellus and Marius drove two columns against the Numidian cities, but Metellus' defeat at Zama forced the Romans to return to Carthage.

Marius returned to Rome, where he was elected consul with the support of the people and over the objections of the Senate. Since the Senate did not give him an army, he called for volunteers. He allowed citizen classes that were usually not used for military service, the capite censi (Romans without property), into the army. Marius thus reformed the Roman army, and went on to defeat and capture Jugurtha (106 BC).

The Senate disliked Marius (because he was a novus homo ("new man") and not part of the elite) and gave the title of Numidicus to Metellus, and recognized Marius' lieutenant Lucius Cornelius Sulla as the conqueror of Numidia. However, Marius retained the support of the people of Rome, and became consul six more times in the following years.
