= Nabdalsa =

2nd century BC Numidian chieftain

Nabdalsa (2nd century BC) was a Numidian chieftain.

Conspicuous both from his birth and wealth, he enjoyed a high place in the favour of the Numidian king Jugurtha, by whom he was frequently employed in services of the most important nature. Because of this trust, Bomilcar selected Nabdalsa as his agent in his plans to kill Jugurtha. But the plot was discovered by the negligence of Nabdalsa. Bomilcar was seized and put to death, but we do not know whether Nabdalsa shared the same fate.
