= Gaius Servilius Glaucia =

Roman politician and praetor (died 100 BC)

Gaius Servilius Glaucia (died late 100 BC) was a Roman politician who served as praetor in 100 BC. He is most well known for being an illegal candidate for the consulship of 99 BC. He was killed during riots and political violence in the year 100 BC while pursuing consular candidacy.

== Career ==
Glaucia was descended from consular ancestors, making him one of the nobiles. His public career started with his holding the quaestorship some time before 109 BC.

In the year 104 or 101 BC (T. R. S. Broughton, in Magistrates of the Roman Republic, expresses both years as possibilities but prefers 101 BC; Ernst Badian asserts 101 BC), Glaucia served as plebeian tribune. His tribunate regardless, was held one year before that of Lucius Appuleius Saturninus, though the specifics cannot be easily pinned down due to a lack of clarity in Appian's account. During his tribunate, he passed legislation transferring the jury pool in the permanent court on extortion (the quaestio de repetundis) from the senatorial class to the equites. In the law, he also provided for recovering extorted funds from the ultimate recipients rather than just those who had been convicted; the law also barred convicts from addressing public assemblies. More scandalously, when presiding over the elections of successors, a successful candidate named Nunnius or Nonius was murdered and Saturninus was elected as replacement.

The censor of 102 BC, Quintus Caecilius Metellus Numidicus, attempted to expel Glaucia from the senate but was unsuccessful. The next year, Glaucia was elected praetor for 100 BC. In this year, he was allied with the consul Gaius Marius and Saturninus. Saturninus started a legislative programme which sought to expand grain subsidies, establish veteran colonies in the provinces, give Marius powers to grant Roman citizenship, and redistribute land seized from the Cimbri (a Germanic tribe the Romans had defeated the previous year). The legislation carried largely by violence and in violation of religious law, was further scandalised by Saturninus winning re-election to the tribunate also through violence.

== Death ==
The date of Glaucia's death is disputed. Appian claims that both he and Saturninus died on 10 December 100 BC. Some modern historians, including Ernst Badian and Emilio Gabba, believe this to be erroneous and that Appian's claims are incompatible with Roman electoral procedure. That Appian's narrative is flawed here is now generally accepted.

Regardless, the narrative of Glaucia's death provided in Appian is largely incompatible with Cicero's more reliable description of the events of 100 BC. Glaucia attempted that year to stand for the consulship and, if his candidacy had been accepted, would have won due to his immense popularity. But his candidacy was rejected by the presiding officer, almost certainly Marius in this case. Appian instead reports that Glaucia was in the process of losing that election to a competitor, Gaius Memmius; Appian claims that, to secure election, Glaucia had Memmius murdered during the comitia in full view of the people.

Badian believes it more likely that, given Cicero's claims of Glaucia's popularity, Saturninus and Glaucia sought instead to pass a plebiscite to overturn Marius' decision and order acceptance of Glaucia's candidacy. After Saturninus had Memmius murdered, probably while fleeing a sudden riot disrupting the comitia, he took the Capitoline Hill and convened a popular assembly there to enact such legislation. At the instigation of Marcus Aemilius Scaurus, then princeps senatus, the senate passed the senatus consultum ultimum; Marius raised a levy and then marched on the hill. Saturninus surrendered but was lynched by a mob after being confined in the senate house. Around the same time, Glaucia was possibly killed after being dragged from a certain Claudius' house. Alternatively, he may have been with Saturninus on the Capitoline where he was lynched shortly after Marius' forces took the hill.

== See also ==
- Servilia gens
