= Siege of Thala =

Battle of the Jugurthine War

Coordinates: 35°34′N 8°40′E

- Part of the Jugurthine War
Date	108 BC
Location	Thala
Result	Roman victory

Belligerents
Roman Republic	Numidia

Commanders and leaders
Quintus Caecilius Metellus	Unknown Numidian commander

Strength
25,000–35,000	Unknown

Casualties and losses
Unknown	Entire town committed suicide or was killed or enslaved

The siege of Thala, part of the Jugurthine War, was an invasion of the Numidian town of Thala by a Roman army. The Romans were commanded by the proconsul Quintus Caecilius Metellus, the Thalans by an unknown Numidian commander. The Romans' main objective was to capture the Numidian king Jugurtha who was reported to be in Thala, but he escaped before the legions reached the fortress town. Metellus then besieged the town to get hold of one of Jugurtha's treasuries which was stored in Thala. The fortress town was besieged for forty days after which most of its inhabitants committed suicide by setting fire to the town.

== Background ==
Numidia between 112 and 105 B.C. and main battles of the war.

King Masinissa of Numidia who was a staunch ally of Rome, died in 148 and was succeeded by his son Micipsa, who ruled from 149 to 118 BC. After Micipsa's death in 118 BC, his two sons, Hiempsal and Adherbal, shared rule of Numidia with his adopted son Jugurtha, the illegitimate grandson of Masinissa. At the siege of Numantia in 134 BC, Jugurtha served under Scipio Aemilianus, where he befriended Roman nobles, learned Latin, and became acquainted with Roman military tactics. Recognizing Jugurtha's growing popularity as a threat to his two sons' claim to the throne, Micipsa officially adopted him and named him joint heir alongside Adherbal and Hiempsal. After Micipsa's death the three kings fell out, and ultimately agreed between themselves to divide their inheritance into three separate kingdoms. When they were unable to agree on the terms of the division Jugurtha declared open war on his cousins. Hiempsal, the younger and braver of the brothers, was assassinated by Jugurtha's agents. Jugurtha gathered an army and marched against Adherbal, who fled to Rome. There he appealed to the Roman Senate for arbitration.

Although the Senate was the executor of Micipsa's will, they now allowed themselves to be bribed by Jugurtha into overlooking his crimes, and organized a commission, led by the ex-Consul Lucius Opimius, to fairly divide Numidia between the remaining contestants in 116 BC. Jugurtha bribed the Roman officials in the commission and was allotted the more fertile and populous western half of Numidia, while Adherbal received the east. Powerless Adherbal accepted and peace was made. Shortly after, in 113 BC, Jugurtha again declared war on his brother, and defeated him, forcing him to retreat into Cirta, Adherbal's capital. Adherbal held out for some months, aided by a large number of Romans and Italians who had settled in Africa for commercial purposes. From inside his siege lines, Adherbal appealed again to Rome, and the Senate dispatched a message to Jugurtha to desist. The latter ignored the demand, and the Senate sent a second commission, this time headed by Marcus Scaurus, a respected member of the aristocracy, to threaten the Numidian king into submission. The king, pretending to be open to discussion, protracted negotiations with Scaurus long enough for Cirta to run out of provisions and hope of relief. When Scaurus left without having forced Jugurtha to a commitment, Adherbal surrendered. Jugurtha promptly had him executed, along with the Romans who had joined in the defence of Cirta. But the deaths of Roman citizens caused an immediate furor among the commoners at home, and the Senate, threatened by the popular tribune Gaius Memmius, finally declared war on Jugurtha in 111 BC.

In 111 BC the consul Lucius Calpurnius Bestia commanded a Roman army against Jugurtha, but he allowed himself to be bribed. The following year the consul Spurius Postumius Albinus succeeded the command against the Numidian king, but he let himself be bribed too. Spurius's brother, Aulus Postumius Albinus, allowed Jugurtha to lure him into the desolate wilds of the Sahara, where the cunning Numidian king, who had reportedly bribed Roman officers to facilitate his attack, was able to catch the Romans at a disadvantage. Half the Roman army were killed, and the survivors were forced to pass under the yoke in a disgraceful symbolism of surrender. The Roman Senate, however, when it heard of this capitulation, refused to honour the conditions and continued the war.

After Postumius' defeat, the Senate finally shook itself from its lethargy, appointing as commander in Africa the plebeian noble Quintus Caecilius Metellus, who had a reputation for integrity and courage. Metellus proved the soundness of his judgement by selecting as officers for the campaign men of ability rather than of rank, men like Gaius Marius and Publius Rutilius Rufus. Metellus arrived in Africa as consul in 109 BC and dedicated several months to a serious disciplinary reform of his demoralised forces.

In spring of 109 BC, Metellus led his reorganised army into Numidia; Jugurtha was alarmed and attempted negotiation, but Metellus prevaricated; and, without granting Jugurtha terms, he conspired with Jugurtha's envoys to capture Jugurtha and deliver him to the Romans. The crafty Jugurtha, guessing Metellus' intentions, broke up negotiation and retreated. Metellus followed and crossed the mountains into the desert, advancing to the river Muthul where the Numidians ambushed them. Through the capable leadership of Metellus, Marius and Rutilius Rufus the Romans won an indecisive victory at the Battle of the Muthul.

== Prelude ==
Some time after the Battle of the Muthul, Metellus' agents and scouts located Jugurtha's army again and the Romans were able to catch up with the Numidians – who were not anticipating their arrival – and forced a battle. The legions won an easy victory, routing the entire Numidian army. Jugurtha managed to escape and with a small force of cavalry and foot soldiers, he travelled to Thala, one of his treasury fortresses.

Metellus learned that Jugurtha and his family, and not unimportantly a vast treasury, were located at Thala. The fortress town was situated in a waterless wasteland, but Metellus was not deterred by this, he commandeered pack animals, saddled them with water sacks and marched his army through the desert to Thala. Along the way a storm unleashed a torrent of rain, greatly benefitting his soldiers, who believed the gods favoured them. Unfortunately for Metellus, Jugurtha got advance warning and fled with his family.

== Siege ==
Metellus' army besieged Thala for forty days; assaulting the walls with ladders, battering the gates and constructing great mounds to provide covering fire for his troops. When the Thalans saw that their town was going to fall they hid the gold, imbibed wine and burned themselves along with much of Thala.

== Aftermath ==
Metellus had conquered Thala, but Jugurtha had escaped him once again. The Numidian king now travelled into the territories of the Gaetulians and started to raise another army from among these Berber people. The war would rage on for another four years and only end when Lucius Cornelius Sulla succeeded in capturing the king himself.
