= Bomilcar (2nd century BC) =

Numidian nobleman of the 2nd century BC

Bomilcar (Punic: 𐤁𐤃𐤌𐤋𐤒𐤓𐤕, BDMLQRT) was a Numidian nobleman of the 2nd century BC and a follower of the Numidian king Jugurtha, whom he later betrayed.

Deep in the confidence of Jugurtha, Bomilcar was employed on many secret services. In particular, when Jugurtha was at Rome, Bomilcar undertook and effected for him the assassination of Massiva II, who happened to be at Rome at the same time, and who, as well as Jugurtha himself, was a grandson of Masinissa, and a rival claimant to the throne of Numidia. The murder was discovered and traced to Bomilcar, who was obliged to enter into large recognizances to appear and stand his trial; but, before the trial came on, his master privately sent him back to Africa.

He also commanded a portion of Jugurtha's army, with which he was defeated in a skirmish at the river Muthul in 109 BC by Publius Rutilius Rufus, lieutenant of Quintus Caecilius Metellus Numidicus. In the winter of the same year Metellus, after his unsuccessful attempt on Zama, engaged Bomilcar by promises of Roman favour to deliver Jugurtha to him alive or dead; and it was accordingly at his instigation that the king sent ambassadors to make offers of unconditional submission to Metellus.

In consequence of this advice Bomilcar seems to have become an object of suspicion to his master, which urged him the more towards the execution of his treachery. Accordingly, he formed a plot with Nabdalsa, a Numidian nobleman, for the seizure or assassination of the king; but the design was discovered to Jugurtha by Nabdalsa's agent or secretary, and Bomilcar was put to death.
