= Jugurthine War =

2nd-century BC war between the Kingdom of Numidia and the Roman Republic

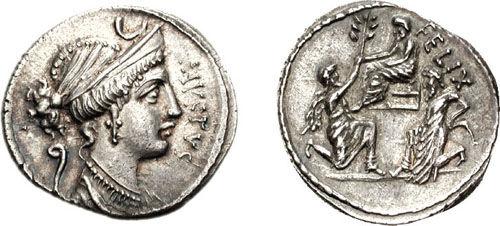
- Coin commemorating Sulla's capture of Jugurtha
Date	111–105 BC
Location	Numidia
Result	Roman victory
Territorial changes	Mauretania given some Numidian territory

Belligerents
Roman Republic; Mauretania (105 BC)	Numidia; Mauretania (107-105 BC)

Commanders and leaders
Lucius Calpurnius; Spurius Postumius; Aulus Postumius; Quintus Numidicus; Gaius Marius; Sulla Felix; Bocchus I (105 BC)	Jugurtha; Bomilcar; Bocchus I (107-105 BC)

The Jugurthine War (Latin: Bellum Iugurthinum; 111–105 BC) was an armed conflict between the Roman Republic and King Jugurtha of Numidia, a kingdom on the north African coast roughly corresponding to modern-day Algeria. Jugurtha was the nephew and adopted son of Micipsa, king of Numidia, whom he succeeded to the throne; he had done so by overcoming his rivals through assassination, war, and bribery.

Following Jugurtha's usurpation of the throne of Numidia, a loyal ally of Rome since the Punic Wars, Rome felt compelled to intervene. The war constituted an important phase in the Roman subjugation of Northern Africa and the rise of the empire, but Numidia did not become a Roman province until 46 BC.

== Jugurtha and Numidia ==
Numidia was a kingdom located in North Africa (roughly corresponding to northern modern day Algeria) adjacent to what had been Rome's arch enemy, Carthage. King Masinissa, who was a steadfast ally of Rome in the Third Punic War, died in 149 BC, and was succeeded by his son Micipsa, who ruled 149–118 BC. At the time of his death, Micipsa had three potential heirs: his two sons, Adherbal and Hiempsal I, and an illegitimate nephew, Jugurtha. Jugurtha had fought under Scipio Aemilianus at the siege of Numantia, where, through friendship with Roman aristocrats, he had formed an acquaintance with Roman manners and military tactics. Micipsa, worried that at his death Jugurtha would usurp the kingdom from his own somewhat less able sons, adopted him, and bequeathed the kingship jointly to his two sons and Jugurtha, with the realm to be divided into three. After King Micipsa's death the three kings fell out, and ultimately agreed among themselves to divide their inheritance into three separate kingdoms; however, they were unable to agree on the terms of division, and Jugurtha declared open war on the other two kings. Hiempsal, who, though the younger, was the braver of the brothers, was assassinated by Jugurtha's agents, and Adherbal, unable to defend himself, was defeated and forced to flee to Rome, where he appealed for arbitration to the Roman Senate.

Although the Senate was given authority by Micipsa to arbitrate his will, they now allowed themselves to be bribed by Jugurtha into overlooking his crimes. The Roman Senate organized a commission, led by the ex-Consul Lucius Opimius, to fairly divide Numidia between the remaining two contestants, starting in 116 BC. However, Jugurtha bribed the Roman officials in the commission into allotting him the better, more fertile and populous western half of Numidia, while Adherbal received the east. Powerless against Roman corruption, Adherbal accepted and peace was made. Shortly thereafter, in 113 BC, Jugurtha again declared war on his cousin anyway, and defeated him, forcing him to retreat into Cirta, Adherbal's capital. Jugurtha's goal was now to conquer, and thus unite, Numidia under his rule.

Rome, seeing this as a threat to stability in the region, sided with Adherbal. With Roman help, Adherbal held out for some months, aided by a large number of Roman Equites who had settled in Africa for commercial purposes. From inside his siege lines, Adherbal appealed again to Rome, and the Senate granted his request. The Roman Senate dispatched a message to Jugurtha to end the war and recognize Abherbal's right to his kingdom. Jugurtha ignored the demand, and the Senate sent a second delegation, this time headed by Consul Marcus Scaurus, a respected member of the aristocracy, to threaten Jugurtha into submission. King Jugurtha, pretending to be open to discussion, protracted negotiations with Scaurus and Adherbal long enough for Cirta to run out of provisions and hope of relief. When Scaurus left without having forced Jugurtha to a commitment, Adherbal surrendered. Jugurtha promptly had him executed, along with all Romans who had joined in the defence of Cirta. The deaths of Roman citizens caused an immediate furor among the commoners at home, and the Senate, threatened by the popular tribune Gaius Memmius, finally declared war on Jugurtha in 111 BC and joined the late Adherbal's side in the war, though with reluctance.

Numidia between 112 and 105 BC and main battles of the war

== Bestia ==
Lucius Calpurnius Bestia, consul for the year, was appointed to command the Roman army in Africa against Jugurtha. He was accompanied by Scaurus and other experienced officers, and received an offer of alliance from Bocchus I, king of Mauretania. The defection of Bocchus, his own father-in-law, filled Jugurtha with alarm, and he sent to the Roman consul to surrender. Ceasing to regard him as a threat, the Roman senators granted him a treaty on extremely lenient terms: Numidia was restored to Jugurtha intact, in exchange for bribes to the Senate, a small additional fine, and the remittal of his war-elephants (which he later bought back at reduced price from corrupt officers). In fact, the treaty of Jugurtha's terms of surrender was so favorable that it led to a renewal of the popular outcry at Rome; at the demand of the tribune Memmius, an investigation was launched into the proceedings of the treaty. Jugurtha was summoned to Rome– with the promise of a safe conduct transit –and appeared as a witness. Rather than complying with the inquisition, he bribed two Roman Tribunes to veto the proceedings and prevent him from testifying. In the ensuing outrage, Jugurtha's cousin Massiva, who had fled to Rome in fear of his cousin, seized the opportunity to press his own claim to the Numidian throne. Jugurtha assassinated him, and the Senate, though initially inclined to accept bribery again to allow him to escape retribution, was ultimately compelled by his insolence and by the fury of the mob to expel him from the city and revoke the recent peace. The armies of Rome were to return to Jugurtha's Numidia.

== Spurius and Aulus Postumius ==
The consul Spurius Postumius Albinus took command of the Roman army in Africa (110 BC), but failed to carry out energetic action, due to incompetence, indiscipline in his army, and – it was alleged – bribery by Jugurtha. Later in the year Albinus returned to Italy, leaving the command to his brother, Aulus Postumius Albinus. The latter, more active though no more able than his brother, decided on a bold strike, marching in mid-winter to besiege the town of Suthul, where the Numidian treasury was kept; however, the town was strongly garrisoned and excellently fortified and could not be captured. Postumius, anxious not to have retreated without striking the enemy a blow, allowed Jugurtha to lure him into the desolate wilds of the Sahara, where the cunning Numidian king, who had reportedly bribed Roman officers to facilitate his attack, was able to catch the Romans at a disadvantage. Half the Roman army was killed, and the survivors were forced to pass under a yoke in a disgraceful symbolism of surrender. The beaten Postumius signed a treaty permanently naming Jugurtha the king of all of Numidia and returning to the peace concluded with Bestia and Scaurus. The Senate, however, when it heard of this capitulation, refused to honour the conditions and continued the war.

== Metellus ==
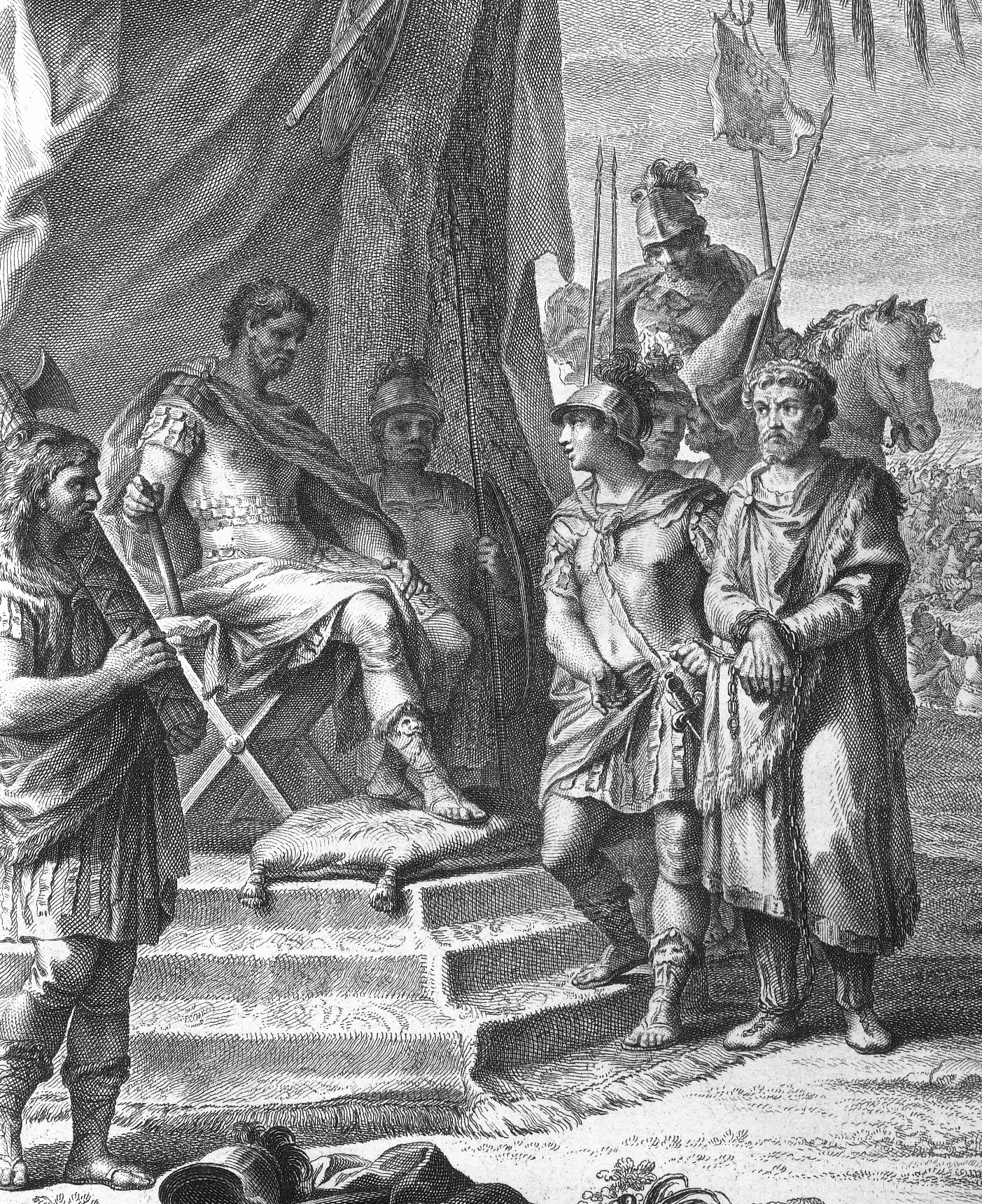
Jugurtha's capture

After Postumius' defeat, the Senate finally shook itself from its lethargy, appointing as commander in Africa the plebeian Quintus Metellus, who had a reputation for integrity and courage. Metellus proved the soundness of his judgement by selecting men as officers for the campaign based on ability rather than of rank. Both Gaius Marius (a plebeian from Arpinum) and the noted disciplinarian and military theorist Publius Rutilius Rufus documented Metellus' commitment to merit and expertise in his officer corps.

When Metellus arrived in Africa in 109 BC, he first had to retrain the army and institute some form of military discipline. In the spring he led his reorganised army into Numidia. Jugurtha was alarmed and opened negotiations, where Metellus attempted to persuade the royal envoys to capture Jugurtha and deliver him to the Romans. The crafty Jugurtha, guessing Metellus' intentions, broke off the talks and withdrew south beyond the Numidian mountains, taking up position on the plains behind them. Metellus followed and crossed the mountains into the desert, advancing to the Muthul River. Jugurtha had divided his army into two detachments, one of which (composed of cavalry and the best of his infantry) lay south of the mountain on the right flank of the Romans, who were marching to the river Muthul, which lay parallel to the mountains, 18 miles to the south; the second detachment (formed of war-elephants and the rest of the infantry) lay further south, closer to the river. Metellus handled the situation by sending one force directly south to the river under Rufus while the rest under Metellus and Marius marched obliquely south-west to dislodge Jugurtha from his position, preventing him from hindering the march of the first body to the river. Jugurtha, however, displaying excellent generalship, dispatched an infantry column formation to hold the mountain passes as soon as the Romans had descended into the plain, thus cutting off their line of retreat; meanwhile, his cavalry harried Metellus' detachment of infantry in swarms along the plain. The Romans were unable to respond effectively since they only had heavy cavalry; on the other hand, the Numidian's light cavalry horses were well-adjusted to the rough terrain and could attack and then flee back with ease. Meanwhile, Rufus had advanced to the river but was attacked by Jugurtha's southern force; thus, the two Roman armies were incapable of coming to each other's relief. However, although Metellus' army was now entrapped in the desert with fewer troops and inferior generalship, the Romans still prevailed simultaneously on both fronts. Rufus overpowered the southern detachment by a forward charge which scattered the war elephants and infantry of the enemy, while Metellus and Marius, rallying a group of legionaries, occupied the single hill on the plain, which commanded the situation. The Roman infantry drove back Jugurtha's inferior Numidian soldiers, who retreated into the desert with severe losses. Metellus had won the Battle of the Muthul, but it was not a definitive victory since the Numidian king had escaped.

A fresh round of negotiations came to nothing, with Metellus rejecting Jugurtha's heavy concessions and demanding that the king surrender himself into Roman custody. To resist the Romans more effectually, Jugurtha dismissed most of his low-quality recruits, keeping only the most active troops of infantry and light cavalry, in order to maintain the war by guerrilla tactics. Metellus advanced once again, capturing town after town, but was unable to capture his enemy. He tried to provoke Jugurtha into a pitched battle by besieging the Numidian city of Zama, but the king refused to let himself be goaded and kept up his irregular warfare. In 108 BC, when Metellus found out the location of Jugurtha's army, he caught up with the Numidians and inflicted a serious defeat on the king. Jugurtha, with his family and treasure boxes, fled to the desert fortress of Thala, which was inaccessible except by an excruciating march of three days through the desert without water. Metellus furnished his army with skins for water transport and followed to besiege the fortress, which fell after forty days. However, Jugurtha managed to escape from the flaming wreckage, undoing all of Metellus' efforts.

At this point Jugurtha retired to the court of his father-in-law, king Bocchus I of Mauretania, who though previously professing friendship for the Romans, now received Jugurtha hospitably, and, without positively declaring war (on Rome), advanced with his troops into Numidia as far as Cirta, the capital. Metellus, who had taken up winter quarters in the area after the conclusion of the campaign, began negotiation with Bocchus to hand over Jugurtha. Before an agreement could be reached, Metellus was deposed from his command by the Roman Tribal Assembly and replaced by his lieutenant, Gaius Marius. An internal struggle in the Roman camp between Metellus and Marius led to this change of command. Metellus looked unfavourably on Marius' known ambitions in Roman politics and refused for days to allow him to sail to Rome and stand for the consulship. Eventually, Metellus permitted Marius to return to Rome and Marius was elected consul in 107. Metellus was, however, unaware that Marius still wanted to command the troops in Numidia, removing him entirely. Numidia was not an area designated to be assigned to a consul by the Roman Senate. However, the populares passed a law in its Tribal Assembly which gave the command against Jugurtha to Marius in 107. This was significant because the Assembly usurped the Senate's rights and powers in this matter and the Senate yielded, failing to contest it.

Metellus was furious at all these developments and decided to make Marius' command a lot more difficult by refusing to let his legions serve under Marius. Metellus sent them back to Italy to join the army of the other consul, Lucius Cassius Longinus, solely to prevent them from being used in Numidia. (Lucius was about to march north to confront a Germanic invasion of Gaul.)

== Marius ==
Marius found Rome's traditional manpower reserves depleted. As inequality increased, fewer men of military age met the property requirements to serve in the legions. Yet, thousands of poor Romans, the Capite Censi or lit. 'Head Count', sat idly in Rome, ineligible to serve. Seeking to use them, and with precedent for waiving the property requirements during the existential crisis that was the Second Punic War, Marius was exempted from the requirements. These events would inspire Marius to try to reform the Roman army.

When Gaius Marius arrived in Numidia as consul in 107 BC, he immediately ceased negotiation and resumed the war. Marius marched west plundering the Numidian countryside, seizing minor Numidian towns and fortresses trying to provoke Jugurtha into a set piece battle, but the Numidian king refused to engage. Marius' strategy was similar to Metellus' and yielded no better results; he continued the occupation of Numidian towns and he fortified several strategic positions. At the end of 107 BC Marius made a dangerous desert march to Capsa in the far south where, after the town surrendered, he executed all survivors. Next he advanced far to the west, capturing a fortress near the river Muluccha where Jugurtha had moved a large part of his treasure. Meanwhile, Jugurtha's loyalists had recaptured Cirta. By marching so far to the west Marius had brought the Roman army very near to the dominions of king Bocchus, finally provoking the Mauretanian into direct war, joining the side of Jugurtha. In the deserts just west of Serif, Marius was taken by surprise by a massive army of Numidians and Mauretanians under command of the two enemy kings. For once, Marius was unprepared for action and in the melee all he could do was form defensive circles. The attack was pressed by Gaetulian and Mauretanian cavalries and for a time Marius and his main force found themselves besieged on a hill, while Marius's quaestor Lucius Cornelius Sulla and his men were on the defensive on another hill nearby. However, the Romans managed to hold off the enemy until evening and the Africans retired, confident of finishing the job the next morning. The Romans surprised the Africans' insufficiently guarded camp the next morning at dawn and completely routed the African army. They then marched east to take Cirta again and go into winter quarters there. The African kings harried the march east with light cavalry, but were beaten back by Sulla whom Marius had put in command of the rearguard and the cavalry. The combined African army then tried to finish off Marius, but when Sulla returned from his pursuit the Romans routed both Jugurtha's and Bocchus's army. Marius had won the Second Battle of Cirta and could now put his army into winter quarters. Marius's army thus finished the year's campaigns in safety at Cirta, but it was by now evident that Rome could not defeat Jugurtha's guerrilla tactics through war. Over the winter, therefore, Marius resumed negotiations with Bocchus, who, though he had joined in the Second Battle of Cirta, had not yet declared war on Rome itself. Ultimately, Marius reached a deal with Bocchus whereby Sulla, who was friendly with members of Bocchus' court, would enter Bocchus' camp to receive Jugurtha as a political hostage. In spite of the possibility of treachery on the Mauritanian's part, Sulla agreed. Siding with their Roman allies, Jugurtha's remaining followers were then treacherously massacred by the Mauritanians, and King Jugurtha was handed over in chains to Sulla by Bocchus. In the aftermath, Bocchus annexed the western part of Jugurtha's kingdom, and was made a friend of the Roman people (a term used to describe a foreign king in good standing with Rome). Jugurtha was thrown into an underground prison (the Tullianum) in Rome, and was ultimately executed after gracing Marius's Roman triumph in 104 BC.

== Revelations ==
The Jugurthine War clearly revealed the issues with political corruption at that time and to come. The fact that a man such as Jugurtha could have his treachery, conquests, and defiances ignored simply by buying Roman military and civil officials reflected Rome's moral and ethical decline. Romans now sought individual power often at the expense of the state. This was illustrated by Marius's rise to power by ignoring Roman traditions. These events were also observed by Marius's quaestor, Lucius Cornelius Sulla, who later came to rival Marius in the first of the great civil wars of the Late Republican Period. The beginning of that rivalry, according to Plutarch, was purportedly Sulla's crucial role in the negotiations for and eventual capture of Jugurtha, which led to Sulla wearing a ring portraying the capture despite Marius being awarded the victory for it.

The Roman historian Sallust wrote a monograph, Bellum Jugurthinum, on the Jugurthine War emphasising this decline of Roman ethics. He placed it, along with his work on the Catilinarian Conspiracy, in the timeline of the degeneration of Rome that began with the Fall of Carthage and ended with the Fall of the Roman Republic itself, believing this was the first of the events that set that collapse in motion. Sallust is one of the most valuable primary sources on the war, along with Plutarch's biographies of Sulla and Marius.
