= Hiempsal I =

Berber King of Numidia

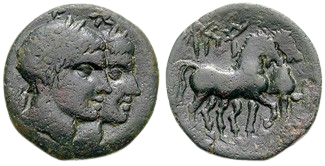
- Coin minted in Cirta dated from 150-100 BC, perhaps depicting Hiempsal and a co-ruler.

King of Numidia
- Reign: c. 118 – c. 117 BCE
- Predecessor: Micipsa
- Successor: Adherbal; Jugurtha
- Died: 117 BCE; Thirmida
- Father: Micipsa

Hiempsal I (died c. 117 BC), son of Micipsa and grandson of Masinissa, was a king of Numidia in the late 2nd century BC.

Micipsa, on his deathbed, left his two sons, Adherbal and Hiempsal, together with his cousin, Jugurtha, joint heirs of his kingdom. Sallust claims the arrangement fell apart almost immediately due to the unprincipled ambition of Jugurtha and the longtime jealousy of his two half-brothers. At the very first meeting of the three princes, their animosity broke into the open. Hiempsal, the younger and more impetuous of the two brothers, gave mortal offence to Jugurtha. After this interview, it being agreed to divide the kingdom of Numidia, as well as the treasures of the late king, among the three princes, they took up their quarters in different towns in the neighborhood of Cirta. But as Hiempsal had imprudently established himself at Thirmida, in a house belonging to a dependant of Jugurtha, the latter took advantage of this circumstance to introduce a body of armed men into the house during the night, who put to death the unhappy prince, together with many of his followers.

Livy, on the other hand, appears, so far as we can judge from the words of his Epitomist, to represent the death of Hiempsal as the result of open hostilities. Orosius, who probably followed Livy, says only Hiempsalem occidit (lit. "He killed the winter").
