= Seybouse River =

River in Algeria

Seybouse
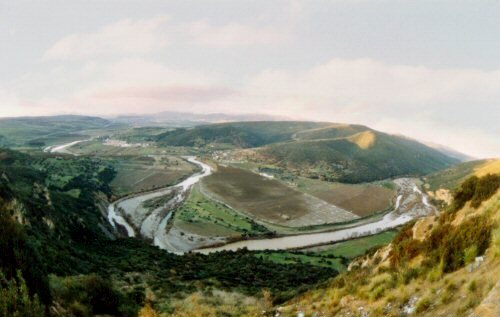
- The Seybouse in Guelma Province, Algeria

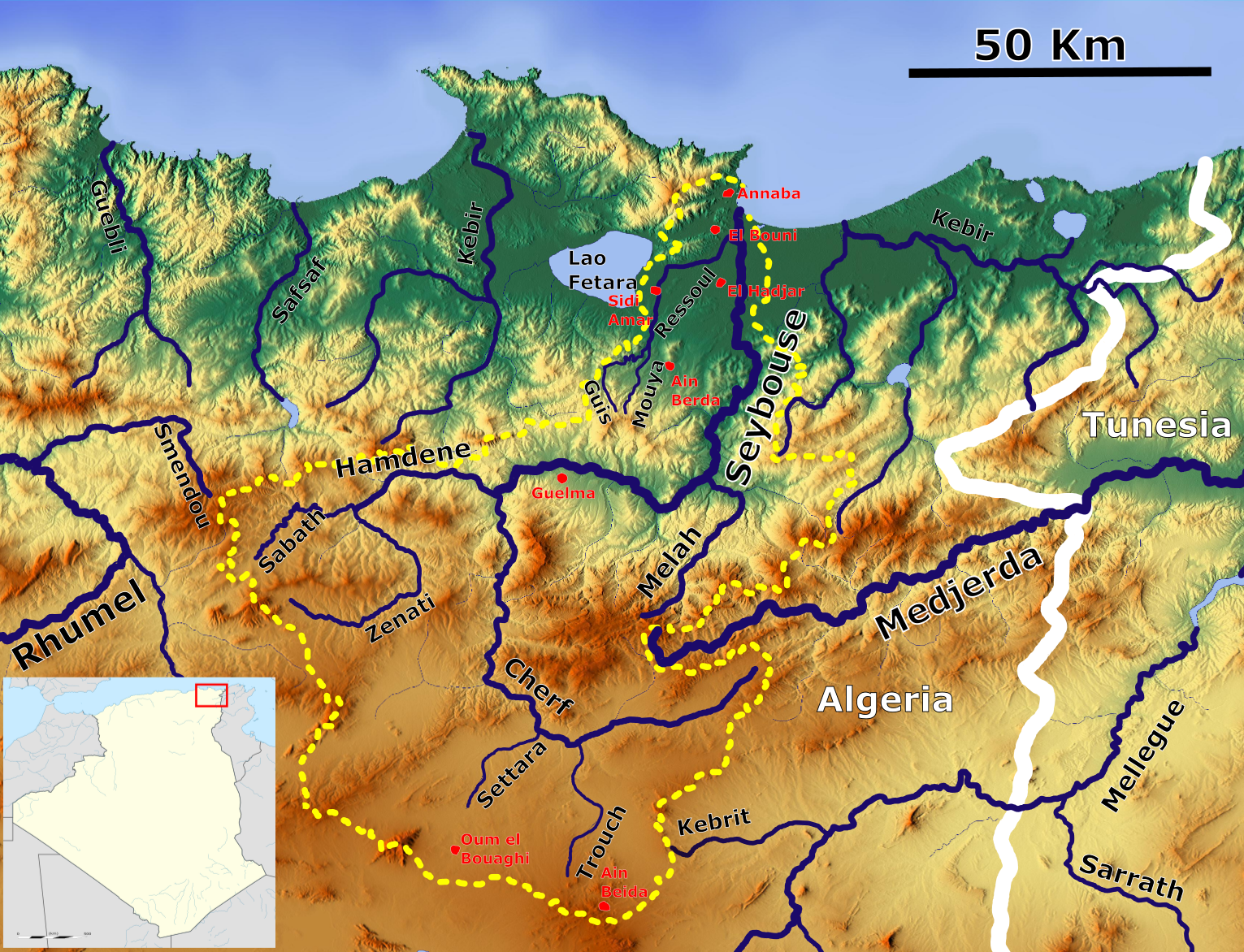
- The Seybouse catchment area
- Native name: وادي سيبوس (Arabic)

Location
- Country: Algeria

Physical characteristics
- Source
  - location: Medjez Amar, Tell Atlas Algeria
- Mouth
  - location: Mediterranean Sea, near Annaba, Algeria
  - coordinates: 36°52′05″N 7°46′27″E
  - elevation: 0 m (0 ft)
- Length: 225 km (140 mi)
- Basin size: 6,471 km^{2} (2,498 sq mi)
- Discharge
  - average: 11.5 m^{3}/s (410 cu ft/s) at Guelma and Annaba

Seybouse (in Algerian Arabic: وادي سيبوس, romanized: Oued Seybouse) is a river in northeastern Algeria, near the border with Tunisia. In Roman times, it was called the Ubus.

== Course ==
The river runs for about 225 kilometres (140 mi), flowing through Guelma and Annaba Provinces. It starts in Medjez Amar, in the Tell Atlas north-west of Guelma Province. Its flows into the Mediterranean Sea at Seybouse (called Joannonville under French rule) to the south-east of the city of Annaba. Its mouth is just north of Sidi Salem, the site of Hippo Regius where Saint Augustine lived in AD 391–430.

The Seybouse is used for irrigation of agricultural areas, but it is becoming polluted because of industrial activities.

== Characteristics ==
(As of 1998; source: ANRH)
Element	Amount
Flow	11.5 m^{3}/s
Temperature	21.41 °C
pH	8.21
Oxygen saturation	36.61%
DBO^{1}	18.33
DCO^{2}	124.3
Nitrates (NO_{3})	5.58
PO_{4}^{−3}	2.29
Ammonium	9.18
