= Adherbal (king of Numidia) =

2nd-century BC King of Numidia

- Agellid of Numidia
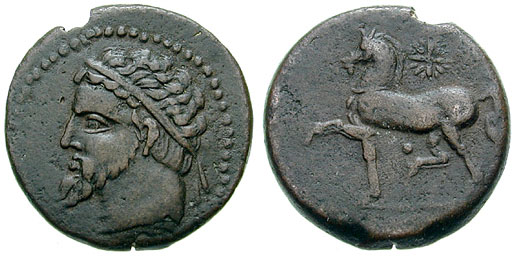
- On the obverse diademed and bearded bust of Adherbal facing left on the revers, horse prancing left with a star above (Note: The star is often interpreted as a sort of coat of arm for the Numidian rulers and can be found on coinage of Masinissa, Micipsa but also Juba I and Juba II)

King of Numidia
- Reign: 118–112 BC
- Predecessor: Micipsa
- Successor: Jugurtha as sole king
- Co-ruler: Hiempsal I; Jugurtha
- Died: 112 BC; Cirta, Numidia
- Punic: 𐤀𐤃𐤓𐤁𐤏𐤋 (ʾdrbʿl) (Note: Meaning "Baal is glorious.")
- Dynasty: Massylii
- Father: Micipsa

Adherbal (Punic: 𐤀𐤃𐤓𐤁𐤏𐤋, ʾdrbʿl) was the son of Micipsa and grandson of Masinissa, was a king of Numidia between 118 till his murder in 112 BC. His reign was marked by a civil war with Jugurtha, his cousin and rival for the throne. An event that would eventually lead to the Jugurthine war, which ended up weakening severely the kingdom.

== Etymology ==
The name is seemingly of Punic origin as it has been mostly been seen among Carthaginian noblemen. The name in itself latinized version of the Punic name 𐤀𐤃𐤓𐤁𐤏𐤋, (ʾdrbʿl) “Baal is great”.

Gabriel Camps notes that the name doesn't appear to be as popular across Numidia as other Punic names; for instance, out of 447 individuals named on the stelae of El Hofra, in Constantine, only two bear this name, whereas there are 37 instances of ‘Abdmelqart, 32 of ‘Abdešmun, 31 of Hannon or Ba’lhannon, and 25 of Ariš.

== Biography ==
The eldest son of Micipsa, he did not inherit the entire Numidian kingdom after his father's death, since primogeniture did not confer any particular right to direct succession. So, upon Micipsa's death in 118 BC, several princes had claims to the crown: Adherbal and his brother Hiempsal , legitimate sons of the deceased king; Gauda, legitimate son of Mastanabal; and Jugurtha, son of Mastanabal by a concubine, who would end up getting adopted by Micipsa. A decision that possibly came from a Roman recommendation, according to Sallust (Bell. Iug. VIII, 2).

Subsequently, Micipsa designated him along with his brother Hiempsal and his adopted brother Jugurtha as heirs to his kingdom, Gauda was listed only as a secondary heir (*Bell. Iug.*, LXV, 1). Plagued by illness and somewhat diminished in mental capacity, Gauda was effectively sidelined from the throne; yet, this did not prevent him during the campaigns of Metellus—from laying claim to the title of king, entering into a secret alliance with Marius, and ultimately securing, upon the death of Jugurtha, possession of what remained of the kingdom of Numidia. His character, therefore, was not nearly as feeble as has been repeatedly claimed ever since the time of Sallust.

Thus, upon the death of Micipsa, Adherbal found himself obliged to share power with his two brothers a setup likely modeled, in Micipsa’s mind, on the power-sharing arrangement imposed by Scipio Aemilianus in 148 BC following the death of Masinissa. However, the three co-heirs could not reach an agreement. Hiempsal, the youngest and most impetuous of the three, made no secret of his hostility toward Jugurtha (Bell. Iug. XI, 3, 7). Unable to find any common ground, the three princes parted ways, each establishing themselves in a different location (essentially sharing the kingdom). Sallust records that Hiempsal occupied Thirmida a site some have sought to identify with Thimida Bure, near Uchi Majus while Adherbal, as the eldest, presumably remained in Cirta, the kingdom’s capital (showing that he was the first heir). It is not known where Jugurtha took up residence.

After the unforeseen murder of his brother by Jugurtha, Adherbal fled to Rome, this was not to get back his share of the kingdom but reportedly to condemn Jugurtha. Sallust attributes a curious speech to Adherbal, one that lends credence to the argument that Numidia was a Roman possession a territory in which Massinissa, Micipsa, and Adherbal himself held only usufructuary rights:

"The kingdom from which I have been driven is the very one that the Roman people bestowed upon my ancestors" (*Bell. Iug.* XIV, 8).

Jugurtha, however, had powerful allies in the Senate and knew how to secure the support of those who were wavering or so claims Sallust, whose anti-aristocratic views are well known. In reality, the Senate’s decision to dispatch a commission to Numidia tasked with partitioning the kingdom between the two princes was, above all, a measure that served Roman interests: it prevented the restoration of the "Greater Numidia" of Massinissa’s time and, under the guise of fairness, maintained an even balance between the two surviving heirs and rivals who were each vying to secure the alliance and friendship of the Roman people.

In 117 BC, the arbitration led by L. Opimius divided the Numidian kingdom: Adherbal received the eastern portion the land of the Massylii, with Cirta remaining its capital while Jugurtha was granted the former territories of the Masaesyli in the west (formely Hiempsal's territory's). This western region, which bordered Mauretania, was, according to Sallust, more populous and wealthier, whereas Adherbal’s territory was more urbanized and possessed a greater number of ports (*portuosior*; *Bell. Iug.* XXVI, 5).

But no sooner had this division been announced than Jugurtha invaded Adherbal’s territory; the latter, defeated once again, took refuge in Cirta. There he would be besieged in Cirta, and killed by Jugurtha in 112 BC, although he had placed himself under the protection of the Romans.

This led to growing tensions between the Roman Republic and the kingdom which eventually led with the murder of Massiva II to the Jugurthine War which would end up severely weakening the power of the numidian royalty.

== Character ==
According to Gabriel Camps, it is difficult to pin down Adherbal’s personality, despite the detailed though not always reliable account provided by Sallust. The fragments of Book XXXIV of Diodorus and the epitome of Book LXIV of Livy offer no further insight into the prince. While he possessed few military talents unlike his adversary, who was man of war he apparently had inherited the peaceable nature of his father, Micipsa, and proved himself to be a rather skillful diplomat. On at least one occasion, he demonstrated moderation and good will: during the famous altercation between Jugurtha and Hiempsal, which arose when the latter attempted to occupy the central seat a position reserved, in principle, for the most esteemed individual, and one that ought to have gone to Jugurtha, as he was the eldest of the three kings. Adherbal tried to end the dispute through the help of the roman senate who owed him as a friend and ally of the Roman people, a decision that ended up being fatal to the young king.

== Speech to the Roman Senate ==
Here, the full translated speech that Adherbal reportedly made to the roman senate according to Sallust:

"Fathers of the Senate, my sire Micipsa admonished me on his death-bed to consider that I was only a steward of the kingdom of Numidia, but that the right and authority were in your hands; at the same time he bade me strive to be as helpful as possible to the Roman people in peace and in war and to regard you as my kindred and relatives. He declared that if I did this, I should find in your friendship an army, and wealth, and bulwarks for my kingdom. As I was following these injunctions of my father, Jugurtha, wickedest of all men on the face of the earth, in despite of your power robbed me, the grandson of Masinissa and hereditary friend and ally of the Roman people, of my throne and all my fortunes. And for myself, Fathers of the Senate, since I was doomed to such a depth of wretchedness, I could wish that I might ask your help rather because of my own services than those of my ancestors; I could wish above all that favours were due to me from the Roman people which I did not need; and failing this, that if they were needed I might accept them as my due. But since virtue alone is not its own protection, and since it was not in my power to mould the character of Jugurtha, I have had recourse to you, Fathers of the Senate, to whom (and this is the greatest part of my wretchedness) I am compelled to be a burden before I have been an aid. All other kings have been admitted to your friendship when they were vanquished in war, or have sought your alliance in their time of peril; our family established friendly relations with Rome during the war with Carthage, at a time when the plighted word of Rome was a greater inducement to us than her fortune. Therefore do not allow me, their descendant and the grandson of Masinissa, to implore your aid in vain. If I had no other reason for asking the favour than my pitiable lot of late a king, mighty in family, fame and fortune; now broken by woes, destitute and appealing to others for help—it would nevertheless be becoming to the majesty of the Roman people to defend me against wrong and not to allow any man’s power to grow great through crime. 8 But in fact I am driven from the lands which the people of Rome gave to my forefathers and from which my father and grandfather helped you to drive Syphax and the Carthaginians. It is your gift, Fathers of the Senate, which has been wrested from me, and in the wrong done to me you have been scorned. Woe’s me! O my father Micipsa, has this been the effect of your kindness, that the man whom you put on an equality with your own children, whom you made a partner in your kingdom, should of all men be the destroyer of your house? Shall my family then never find rest? Shall we always dwell amid blood, arms and exile? While the Carthaginians were unconquered, we naturally suffered all kinds of hardship; the enemy were upon our flank, you, our friends, were far away; all our hope was in our arms. After Africa had been freed from that pestilence, we enjoyed the delights of peace, since we had no enemy, unless haply at your command. But lo! on a sudden, Jugurtha, carried away by intolerable audacity, wickedness and arrogance, after killing my brother, who was also his kinsman, first made Hiempsal’s realm the spoil of his crime; then, when he had failed to outwit me by the same wiles, and when under your sovereignty I was looking for anything rather than violence or war, he has made me, as you see, an exile from home and country, a prey to want and wretchedness, and safer anywhere than in my own kingdom. I always used to think, Fathers of the Senate, as I had heard my father maintain, that those who diligently cultivated your friendship undertook an arduous duty, indeed, but were safe beyond all others. Our family has done its best to aid you in all your wars; that we may enjoy peace and safety, Fathers of the Senate, is in your power. Our father left two of us brothers; a third, Jugurtha, he hoped to add to our number by his favours. One of the three has been slain; I myself have barely escaped the sacrilegious hands of the other. What shall I do, or to what special protection shall I appeal in my troubles? All the defences of my house are destroyed. My father, as was inevitable, has paid the debt of nature. My brother has lost his life through the crime of a kinsman, the last man who ought to have raised a hand against him. Relatives, friends, and others who were near to me have fallen by one blow or another. Of those taken by Jugurtha some have been crucified, others thrown to wild beasts; a few, whose lives were spared, in gloomy dungeons amid sorrow and lamentation drag out an existence worse than death. But if all that I have lost, or all that has turned from affection to hostility, remained untouched, even then, if any unexpected misfortune had befallen me, I should appeal to you, Fathers of the Senate, whom it befits, because of the extent of your dominion, to take under your care all matters of right and wrong everywhere. As it is, however, an exile from home and country, alone, and stripped of all that becomes my station, where shall I take refuge or to whom shall I appeal? To nations or kings, all of whom are hostile to our family because of our friendship for you? To what land can I turn and not find there many a record of my ancestors’ acts of hostility? Can anyone feel compassion for us who was ever your enemy? Finally, Fathers of the Senate, Masinissa instructed us to attach ourselves to none save the Roman people and to contract no new leagues and alliances; he declared that in your friendship there would be for us all an ample protection, and that, if the fortune of your empire should change, we must fall with it. Through valour and the favour of the gods you are mighty and powerful, all things are favourable and yield obedience to you; hence you may the more readily have regard to the wrongs of your allies. My only fear is lest private friendship for Jugurtha, the true character of which is not evident, may lead some of your number astray; for I hear that his partisans are using every effort, and are soliciting and entreating each of you separately not to pass any judgment upon him in his absence without a hearing. They declare that I am speaking falsely and feigning the necessity for flight, when I might have remained in my own kingdom. As to that, I hope that I may yet see the man through whose impious crime I have been subjected to these woes making the same pretence, and that at last either you or the immortal gods may begin to take thought for human affairs! Then of a truth that wretch, who now exults and glories in his crimes, will be tortured by ills of every kind and pay a heavy penalty for his treachery to our father, for the murder of my brother, and for my unhappiness. At last, brother dearest to my heart, although life has been taken from you untimely by the last hand that should have been raised against you, yet your fate seems to me a cause for joy rather than for sorrow. For when you lost your life it was not your throne you lost, but it was flight, exile, want and all these woes which weigh me down. While I, poor wretch, hurled from my father’s throne into this sea of troubles, present a tragedy of human vicissitude, being at a loss what course to take, whether to try to avenge your wrongs when I myself am in need of aid, or to take thought for my throne when the very question of my life or death hangs upon the help of others. Would that death were an honourable means of escape for one of my estate! Would that, worn out by affliction, I could succumb to oppression without appearing justly contemptible! As it is, life has no charms for me, but death is impossible without shame. Fathers of the Senate, I beseech you in your own name, by your children and parents, and by the majesty of the Roman people, aid me in my distress, set your faces against injustice, do not permit the kingdom of Numidia, which belongs to you, to be ruined by villainy and the blood-guiltiness of our family."

From JC Rolfe's translation of Sallust's Jugurthine war.

== Coinage ==
Rare Numidian coins, featuring a galloping horse on the reverse, bear the two-letter legend A L (Mazard nos. 22 and 40). These coins which are otherwise indistinguishable from those of Massinissa and Micipsa, which bear the legend "M N" are generally attributed to Adherbal. At the beginning of the 1st century BC, another Numidian prince bore the name Adherbal; he is described as filius regis Numidarum ("son of the king of the Numidians") (Vir. illustr. 66), from which it is inferred that he was the son of Gauda. But this Adherbal is a way too shadowy figure for the coins to be attributed to him.

== Depiction in arts ==
François Joseph Lagrange-Chancel's 1694 French play Adherbal, King of Numidia is based on his story.

== See also ==
- List of Kings of Numidia
- Hiempsal I
- Jugurtha
- Siege of Cirta
- Jugurthine War
