= Gaius Memmius (governor of Macedonia) =

Roman politician

Gaius Memmius (c. 140s BC – December 100 BC) was a Roman politician. He was murdered by Gaius Servilius Glaucia during the disturbances that rocked Rome during the violent uprising and suppression of Lucius Appuleius Saturninus.

== Career ==
Gaius Memmius was elected tribune of the plebs in 111 BC, and was instrumental in relaunching the Jugurthine War after Jugurtha’s surrender in 111 BC. During his tribunate, he accused the consul Lucius Calpurnius Bestia, the senator Marcus Aemilius Scaurus and other aristocrats of accepting bribes from King Jugurtha. He summoned Jugurtha to appear in Rome, and promised him safe conduct in order that he may be questioned, but when Jugurtha arrived, Memmius was prevented from questioning the king by his colleague Gaius Baebius, whom Jugurtha bribed to impose his veto.

Memmius served as praetor sometime between in 107 and 102 BC, and this was followed by the proconsular governorship of Macedonia. Then, Marcus Aemilius Scaurus prosecuted Memmius with the charge of extortion. Memmius was found not guilty of all charges.

In 100 BC, Memmius was a candidate for the consulship of the following year (99 BC), but was slain in a riot on the election day, stirred up by his rival the praetor Gaius Servilius Glaucia. It has been speculated that, primarily due to Cicero describing him as consul designatus, Memmius was actually elected Consul in the disrupted elections of 99 BC, and was killed after his successful candidature was announced in the Roman Forum.

== Character ==
Sallust refers to Memmius as "a man fiercely hostile to the power of the nobles" and states that he gave speeches whipping up the plebs, urging them not to accept the behaviour of the nobles. Sallust describes him as an orator, but Cicero had a poor opinion of him.

== Sources ==
- Broughton, T. Robert S., The Magistrates of the Roman Republic, Vol I (1952)
- Broughton, T. Robert S., The Magistrates of the Roman Republic, Vol III (1986)
- Sumner, G.V. (1973). The Orators in Cicero's Brutus: Prosopography and Chronology. University of Toronto Press. ISBN 0-8020-5281-9.
