= 151 =

151 may refer to:

- AD 151, a year
- 151 BC, a year
- 151 (number), the natural number following 150 and preceding 152
- Bacardi 151
- Psalm 151
- ZIS-151
- 151 Abundantia, a main-belt asteroid
- U.S. Route 151, a road
- 151 Regiment RLC

== See also ==
- NH 151 (disambiguation)
- 151 Wing (disambiguation)
