= Hamilcar the Samnite =

2nd-century BC Carthaginian pro-democracy politician

Hamilcar (Punic: 𐤇𐤌𐤋𐤊, ḥmlk, or 𐤇𐤌𐤋𐤒𐤓𐤕, ḥmlqrt) Hamilcar the Samnite was a Carthaginian politician and one of the leaders of a democratic faction in the first half of the 2nd century BCE. He is recorded in historical sources as leading the democratic political party in Carthage, alongside another leader named Carthalo.

== Participation in the Numidian–Carthaginian War ==
Other factions in Carthage included a pro-Roman party led by Hanno the Great and a party favoring alliance with the Numidian king Massinissa, founded by Hannibal the Starling.

In 151 BCE, Hamilcar orchestrated the expulsion of forty members of the pro-Numidian party. These exiles fled to King Massinissa’s residence in Cirta, prompting him to send his sons, Micipsa and Gulussa, to Carthage to negotiate the return of the exiles. The princes were turned away, and Hamilcar even attacked Gulussa, killing several of his attendants. This escalated tensions, ultimately leading to open Numidian–Carthaginian War.

Because Rome had prohibited Carthage from waging war, these events directly contributed to the outbreak of the Third Punic War. In 149 BCE, Carthage sent five envoys to Rome to prevent the impending Roman attack. One of these envoys was named Hamiicar, though it remains uncertain whether this was Hamilcar the Samnite or another individual of the same name.

== Sources ==
- Geus, Klaus (1994), Prosopographie der Literarisch Bezeugten Karthager, Orientalia Lovaniensia Analecta, Vol. 59, Studia Phoenica, No. 13, Leuven: Peeters, ISBN 9789068316438. (in German)
