= Numidia =

Kingdom in North Africa, 202 to 25 BC

Kingdom of Numidia Regnum Numidiae (Latin)
- 202 BC–25 BC
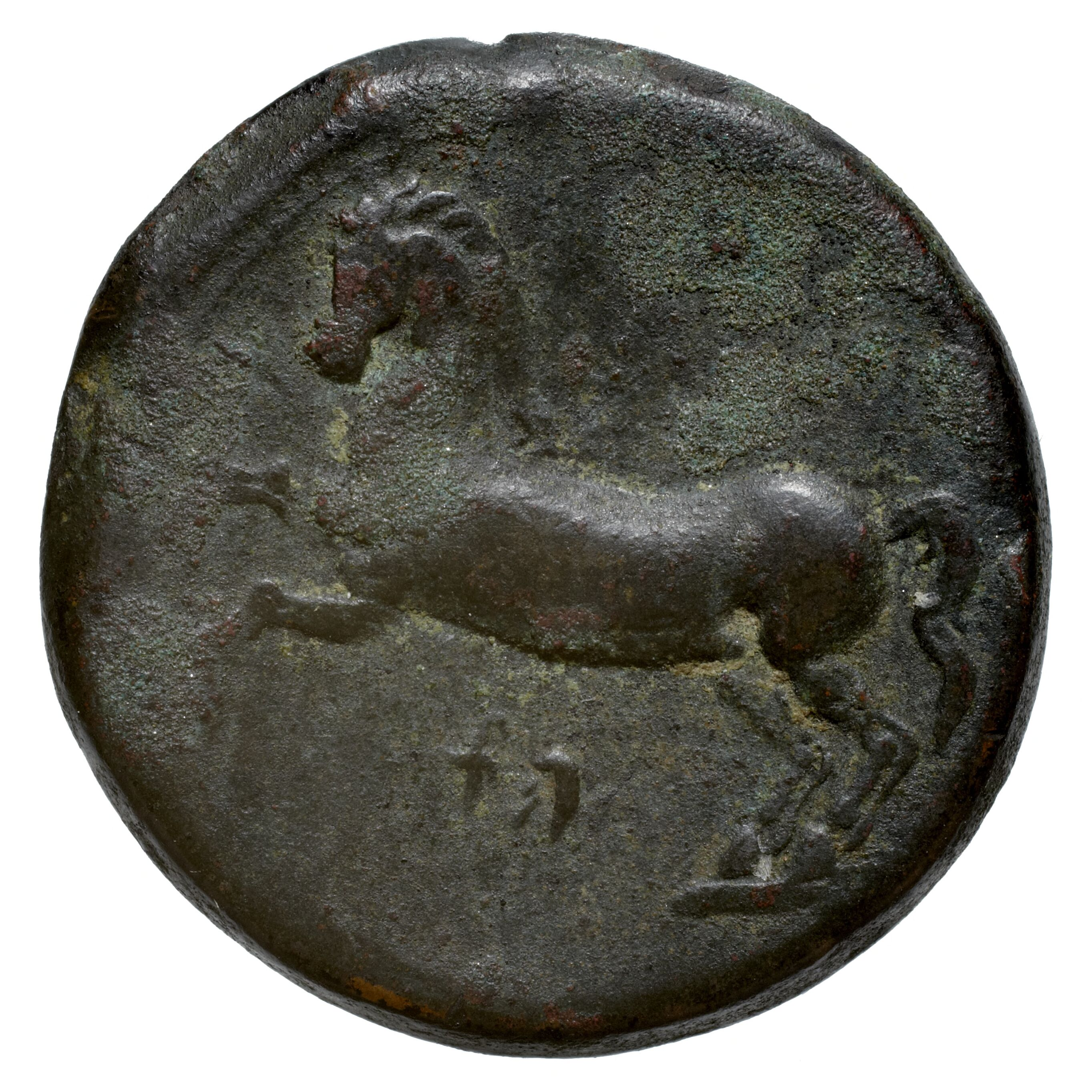
- Numidian coin under Massinissa

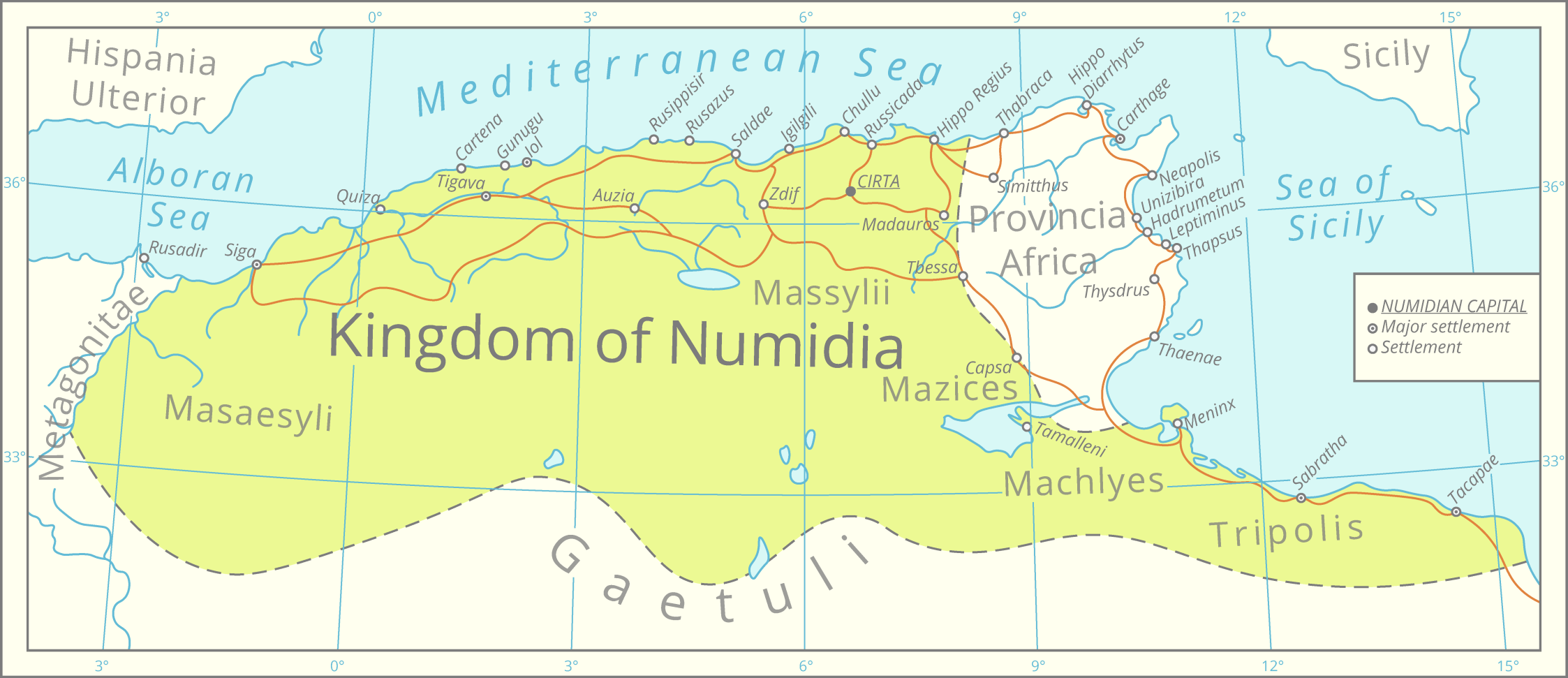
- Map of Numidia after the Punic Wars
- Capital: Cirta (today Constantine, Algeria)
- Official languages: Punic (Note: Punic and Neo-Punic was especially dominant during the early era of the Numidian kingdom. Several official Punic inscriptions survive, and Numidian coins were minted in Punic at first, likely because it was the most influential language when it came to trade in the area. Some historians even consider it the official language of Numidia during its early/mid eras.) (Note: The Punic language and religion survived the cataclysm too. Many if not most Libyan communities used Punic for official purposes, as did the Numidian kingdom.)
- Common languages: Numidian (Note: Used especially in funerary and votive steles, with a few surviving "official" royal inscriptions.); Latin (Note: During the later eras of Numidia, Latin started replacing Punic as the dominant secondary language inside Numidia. Coins were minted in Latin, and inscriptions in Latin began appearing, however, many of those Latin inscriptions may have been from the Roman era itself); Greek (Note: Greek first appeared in the region through trade routes opened up by Massinissa, and gained traction and influence by the end of the kingdom when the Numidian dynasty intermarried and mixed with the Ptolemaic dynasty.)
- Religion: Numitheism, Punic Religion
- Government: Monarchy
- King
  - 202–148 BC: Masinissa
  - 148 – 118 BC: Micipsa
  - 148 – 145 BC: Gulussa
  - 148–140 BC: Mastanabal
  - 118–117 BC: Hiempsal I
  - 118–112 BC: Adherbal
  - 118–105 BC: Jugurtha
  - 105–88 BC: Gauda
  - 88–84 BC: Masteabar
  - 88–60 BC: Hiempsal II
  - 84–82 BC: Hiarbas
  - 82–46 BC: Massinissa II
  - 60–46 BC: Juba I
  - 44–40 BC: Arabion
- Historical era: Antiquity
  - Established: 202 BC
  - Annexed by the Roman Empire: 25 BC
- Currency: Numidian coin, Carthaginian coinage
Preceded by
Ancient Carthage
Massylii
Masaesyli
Succeeded by
Numidia (Roman province)
Mauretania
- Today part of: Algeria; Tunisia; Libya; Morocco

Numidia (Latin: Regnum Numidiae) was the ancient Libyan kingdom of the indigenous Numidian Berbers in Northwest Africa during the Hellenistic period. Initially comprising the northern part of what is now Algeria, Numidia expanded into western modern Tunisia and Libya. The polity was originally divided between the Massylii state in the east, with its capital at Cirta, and the Masaesyli state in the west, with its capital at Siga. During the Second Punic War (218–201 BC), Masinissa, king of the Massylii, defeated Syphax of the Masaesyli to unify Numidia into the first unified Berber state in North Africa. Initially an independent state and an ally of Rome, the kingdom later alternated between being a Roman province and a Roman client state.

At its foundation, Numidia was bordered by the Moulouya River to the west. It extends toward Cyrenaica to the east except where lay the Carthaginian hinterlands of eastern Tunisia. The Mediterranean Sea formed its northern boundary, while the southern frontier reached the Saharan regions inhabited by the Gaetulians.

== Etymology ==
The Numidians were people who inhabited North Africa, specifically the regions that now form northern Algeria and western Tunisia, during the final three centuries of the first millennium BC. The Greek historians referred to these peoples as Νομάδες (i.e. Nomads), which by Latin interpretation became Numidae (but cf. also the correct use of Nomades). Historian Gabriel Camps, however, disputes this claim, favoring instead a local African origin for the term.

Numidians famously appear in works by Greek historians and travellers such as Herodotus and Pausanias and later Roman historians such as Pliny the Elder, Livy and Sallust, in the First Punic War (264–241 BC), when the Greek historian Polybius first noted the strength and versatility of the Numidian cavalry. He also indicated the peoples and territory west of Carthage including the entire north of Algeria as far as the river Mulucha (Muluya), about 160 kilometres (100 mi) west of Oran.

== History ==
=== Background ===
The emergence of Libyan monarchical states was probably stimulated, at least partly, from a combination of internal developments and external political pressure from Carthage. Internally, population growth and the widespread adoption of iron technology significantly increased the agricultural carrying capacity of the land. This allowed for more complex social organization and ultimately led to institutionalized inequality. In addition, a key internal factor was the military shift in the early third century BC from war chariots to cavalry. This change greatly increased mobility and allowed chiefs to extend their authority over much larger areas.

Externally, sustained contact with Phoenician settlers and Carthage also played a significant role. Phoenician coastal settlements traded with the interior for goods such as ivory, hides, and precious stones. Numidians and Mauri also served as mercenaries or allied troops in Carthaginian armies. A notable example is Zelalsan, ancestor of the Massylian royal dynasty around 250 BC, who bore the Phoenician title sufet, suggesting that some Numidian communities were organized along Phoenician civic lines. Carthage may have encouraged the rise of local kings to facilitate control over dependent territories. Consequently, Carthage's militaristic expansionism from the late sixth century BC may also have caused the formation of larger and stronger competing Libyan polities as a response to this pressure.

By the time of the Second Punic War in 218 BC, the previously scattered Numidian tribes had consolidated into two great and rival tribal groups: the Massylii in eastern Numidia, and the Masaesyli in the west. During the first part of the Second Punic War, the eastern Massylii, under their king Gala, were allied with Carthage, while the western Masaesyli, under king Syphax, were allied with Rome. The Kingdom of Masaesyli under Syphax extended from the Moulouya river to Oued Rhumel.

The Romans worked hard to cultivate Syphax's friendship, and helped to train his troops in the techniques of infantry warfare. Syphax initially revolted against Carthage, but Gala's son Masinissa, raised in Carthage, rallied forces and helped Carthage defeat Syphax twice by 213 BC, forcing him to flee. Masinissa then joined the Carthaginian general Hasdrubal Barca in Spain, where he played a key role in Carthaginian campaigns against Rome. After Gala's death, Carthage stripped Masinissa's family of their lands, prompting him to ally with Rome. Returning to Africa, he initially partnered with Syphax against Carthage. However, Hasdrubal married his daughter Sophonisba to Syphax, securing his loyalty to Carthage. Syphax defeated Masinissa twice in 205 BC, forcing him to retreat into the mountains, where he waged a guerrilla campaign, eluding capture and eventually joining forces with Scipio's Roman army.

=== Establishment ===
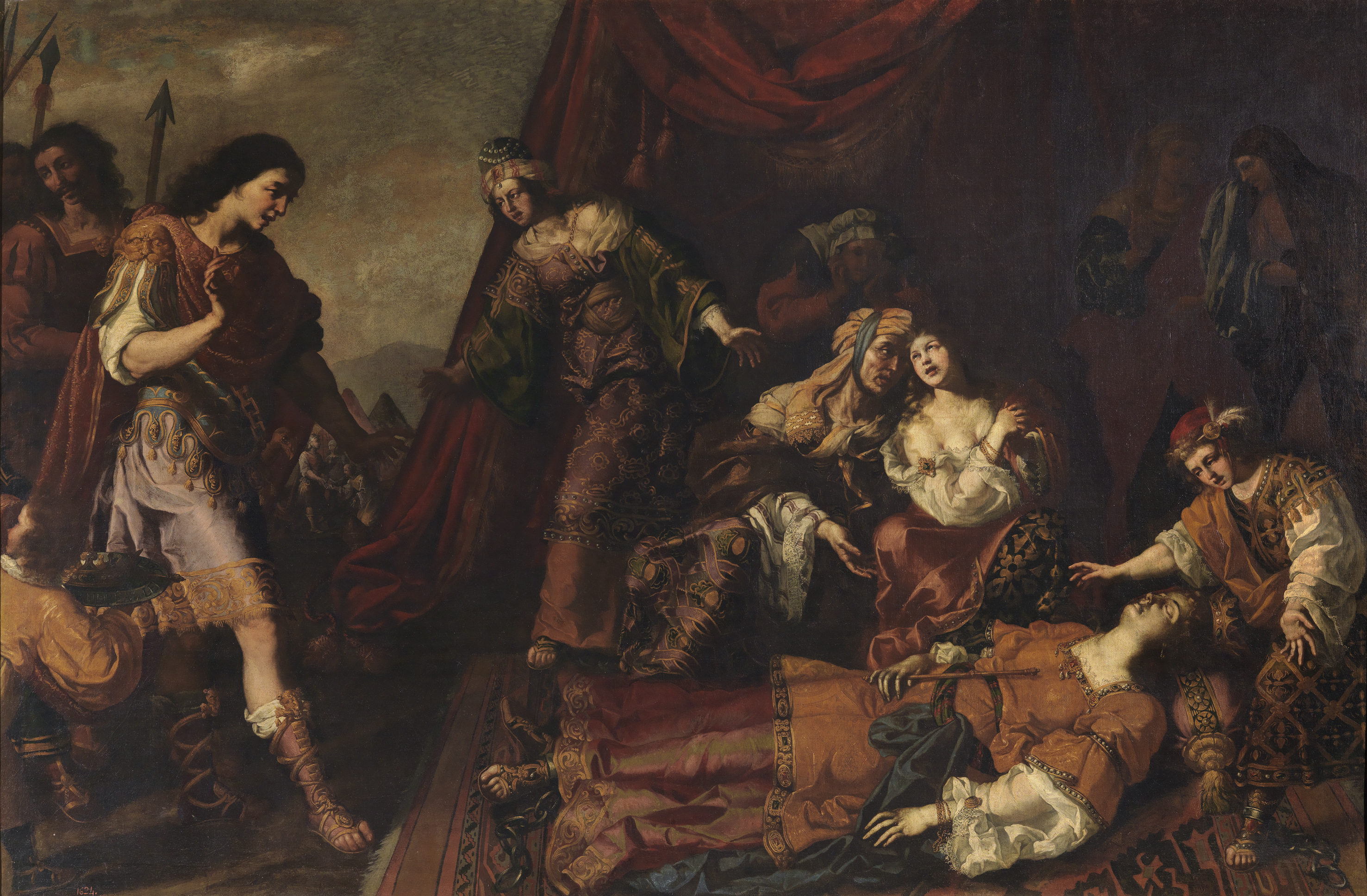
Masinissa crying Sophonisba's Death, by Paolo Domenico Finoglia (1590–1645)

In 204 BC, the Roman general Scipio Africanus landed in Africa with Roman forces, joined by Masinissa, whose tactical brilliance became evident when he helped destroy a combined Carthaginian-Numidian camp and later defeated Syphax and Hasdrubal at the Battle of Cirta in 203 BC. Masinissa captured Syphax and married Sophonisba, but Scipio, wary of her Carthaginian loyalty, demanded her surrender. To avoid enslavement, Sophonisba took poison, dying in 203 BC. In return, Scipio proclaimed Masinissa king of all Numidia.

Scipio Africanus honored Masinissa with a gold crown, a gold patera, a curule chair, an ivory sceptre, a toga picta, and a tunica palmata—the traditional symbols of a Roman triumphator. Scipio declared that nothing was more magnificent among the Romans than these honors, implying that Masinissa was the only foreigner worthy of such distinction. These rewards recognized Masinissa's crucial role in securing Rome's victory in the war.

Masinissa regained his father's kingdom, and also took control of much of Syphax's territory. The Second Punic War ended with a Roman victory at the battle of Zama in 202 BC, and Masinissa of the Massylii consolidated his position as the first king of a united Numidia with enthusiastic Roman patronage. The Romans were determined to keep a powerful ally in Africa to prevent the Carthaginians from threatening their hard-won hegemony in the western Mediterranean.

Having been educated in Carthage, Masinissa felt no hostility toward the Carthaginians. Several of his relatives bore Carthaginian names and his brother and uncle had family connections with Hannibal through marriage, and his grandson would later serve as a general there. However, to expand Numidia's wealth, he sought to enlarge its lands — and the only valuable ones available belonged to Carthage.

Massinissa, constantly encroaching on the territory left to the Carthaginians, had, by 158 BC, conquered Lepcis Magna and the Tripolitanian coast, bringing under his authority all the Berber tribes established between Cyrenaica and the Ampsaga River. Masinissa's territory extended from the Mulucha river to the boundary of the Carthaginian territory, and also southeast as far as Cyrenaica to the gulf of Sirte, so that Numidia entirely surrounded Carthage (Appian, Punica, 106) except towards the sea. Furthermore, after the capture of Syphax the king of the Masaesyli (West Algeria) with his capital based in Siga and after losing Siga had relocated to a temporary capital in Tinga, Bokkar, had become a vassal of Massinissa. Massinissa had also penetrated as far south beyond the Atlas to the Gaetuli and Fezzan was part of his domain.

=== War with Carthage ===
In red Rome, in grey Carthage and in purple Numidia.

Carthage, complaining about Massinissa's encroachments as he had taken control of most of the emporia or African ports, thereby ruining its trade, appealed to Rome, which sent commissioners to investigate the grievances on-site. Among these envoys was Marcus Cato, who, upon observing the rapid recovery of Carthage, whose fleet and army had been rebuilt, advocated for the destruction of the Punic metropolis. He concluded all his reports and speeches with the words: "Moreover, I think Carthage must be destroyed."

According to Appian's sometimes unreliable account, three main factions dominated Carthage's internal politics in the mid-2nd century BC: a pro-Roman group supposedly led by Hanno III the Great, a pro-Numidian faction under a "Hannibal the Starling," and a "democratic" faction led by Hamilcar "the Samnite" and Carthalo. In practice, the first two groups likely shared similar goals, since Rome and Numidia were closely aligned. The "democrats," by contrast, appear to have favored wider political participation for ordinary citizens and opposed the entrenched aristocracy—continuing the reformist tradition of Hannibal Barca's era.

When Masinissa seized more Carthaginian territory in 152 BC, political tensions within the city intensified. The democratic, now nationalist, faction gained control and exiled around forty of their rivals, including the "Starling." They even forced citizens to swear never to recall them. The exiles fled to Numidia, giving Masinissa the perfect excuse to intervene. After his son Gulussa was ambushed by Hamilcar's men, the elderly but still energetic king invaded Carthaginian lands in 151 BC with an army of 52,000 men, besieging a town called "Oroscopa." Hasdrubal, leading a force of 30,000 men to relieve the city, was decisively defeated by Gulussa, Massinissa's son, in 150 BC. By preparing to fight back, Carthage effectively broke the peace treaty of 201 BC—an act that would soon trigger Rome's wrath and lead directly to the Third Punic War.

Learning that Carthage had waged war against a prince allied with Rome, the Romans dispatched an army of 80,000 men to Africa. In 146 BC Carthage was obliterated by the armies of Consul Scipio Aemilianus after a 3 years long siege and 8 days of urban fighting in the city. The victors reduced Carthage's territory to a Roman province, which they named the "Province of Africa."

=== Numidian Apogee ===
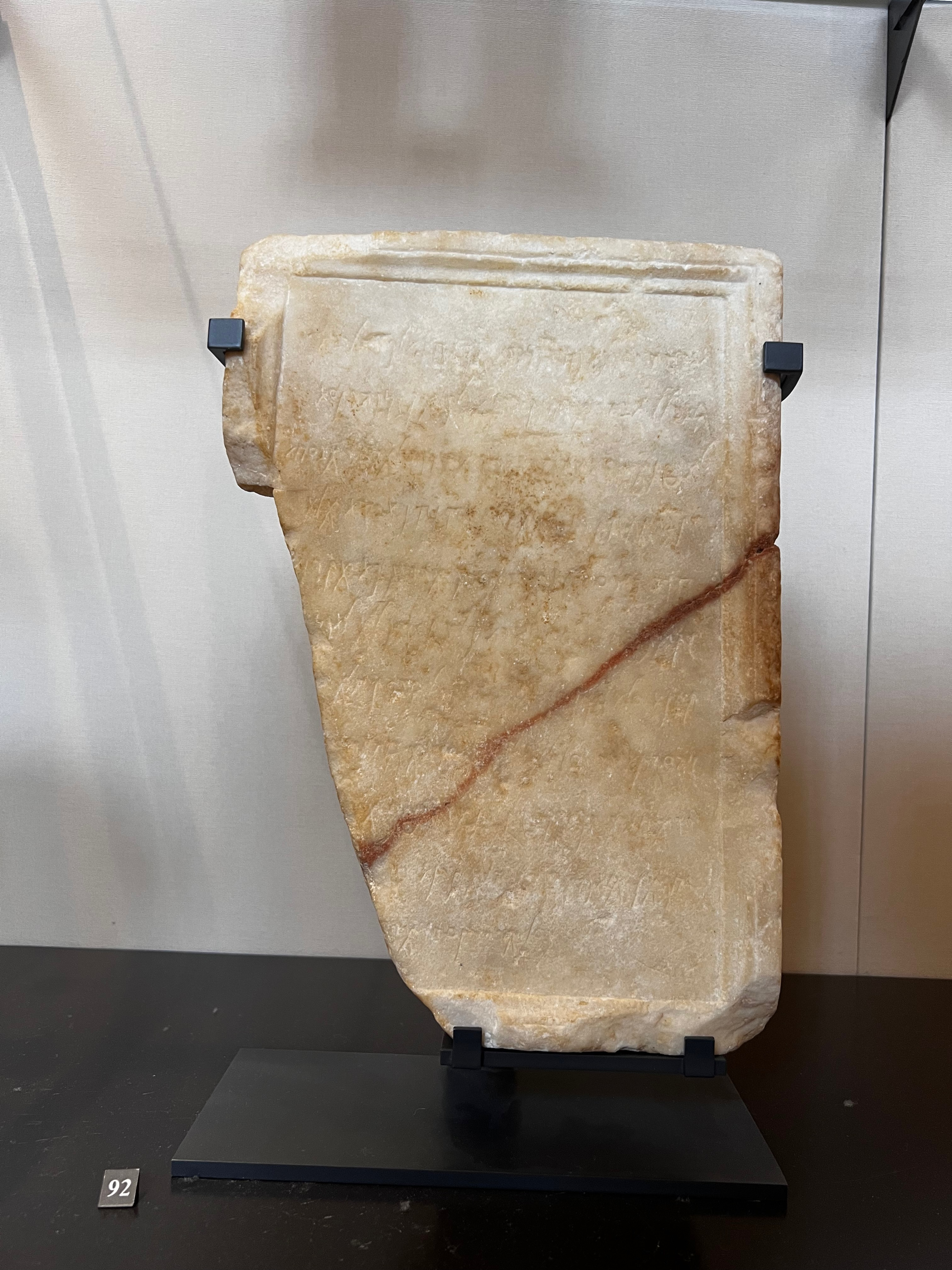
Marble with Punic inscription mentioning king Micipsa found in Caesarea.

Under Masinissa and his son Micipsa, Numidia flourished. During this era of stability, Numidia advanced significantly. Settled agriculture expanded alongside traditional pastoralism, towns grew more urbanized, and trade flourished through access to former Carthaginian ports. The kingdom maintained Roman favor by supplying grain and military auxiliaries, including cavalry, infantry, and elephants. The Numidian kings tried to involve themselves in the Greek-dominated Hellenistic culture of the eastern Mediterranean. In their coin portraits, Masinissa and Micipsa often wore a diadem, a white ribbon tied around the head and recognized as a Hellenistic symbol of monarchy. They financed the construction of Greek-style buildings in their cities, and one of Masinissa's sons even competed in the Panathenaic Games.

Politically, he engaged in the eastern Mediterranean, aiding Rome in the Macedonian Wars, sending troops to Greece, and supplying grain to Delos (which honored him). Dubious of his intentions in the aftermath of the Macedonian wars, Rome rejected his request to visit the Senate and make a sacrifice in the Capitol. Masinissa also maintained ties with Hellenistic monarchs such as Nicomedes II of Bithynia, while his sons received their education in Greece, probably Athens.

Masinissa ruled for 55 years until his death in 148 BC, shortly before Rome's destruction of Carthage in 146 BC. Micipsa succeeded him, reigning for another 30 years. The three sons of Massinissa jointly ruled Numidia, under Roman oversight. At the request of Masinissa, Scipio Aemilianus arranged a division of Masinissa's kingdom and inheritance. Micipsa managed the palace and the treasury in Cira, Gulussa was given command of the Numidian army and Mastanabal was appointed chief Judicial authority in the kingdom. On the death of his two brothers in 145 BC, Micipsa, finding himself sole heir to the kingdom of Massinissa, reigned in Cirta, with the help of his two sons Adherbal and Hiempsal I, and his nephew Jugurtha, son of his brother Manastabal. An ambitious Jugurtha proved to be a capable warrior in the Roman siege of Numantia in 134 BC.

=== War with Rome ===
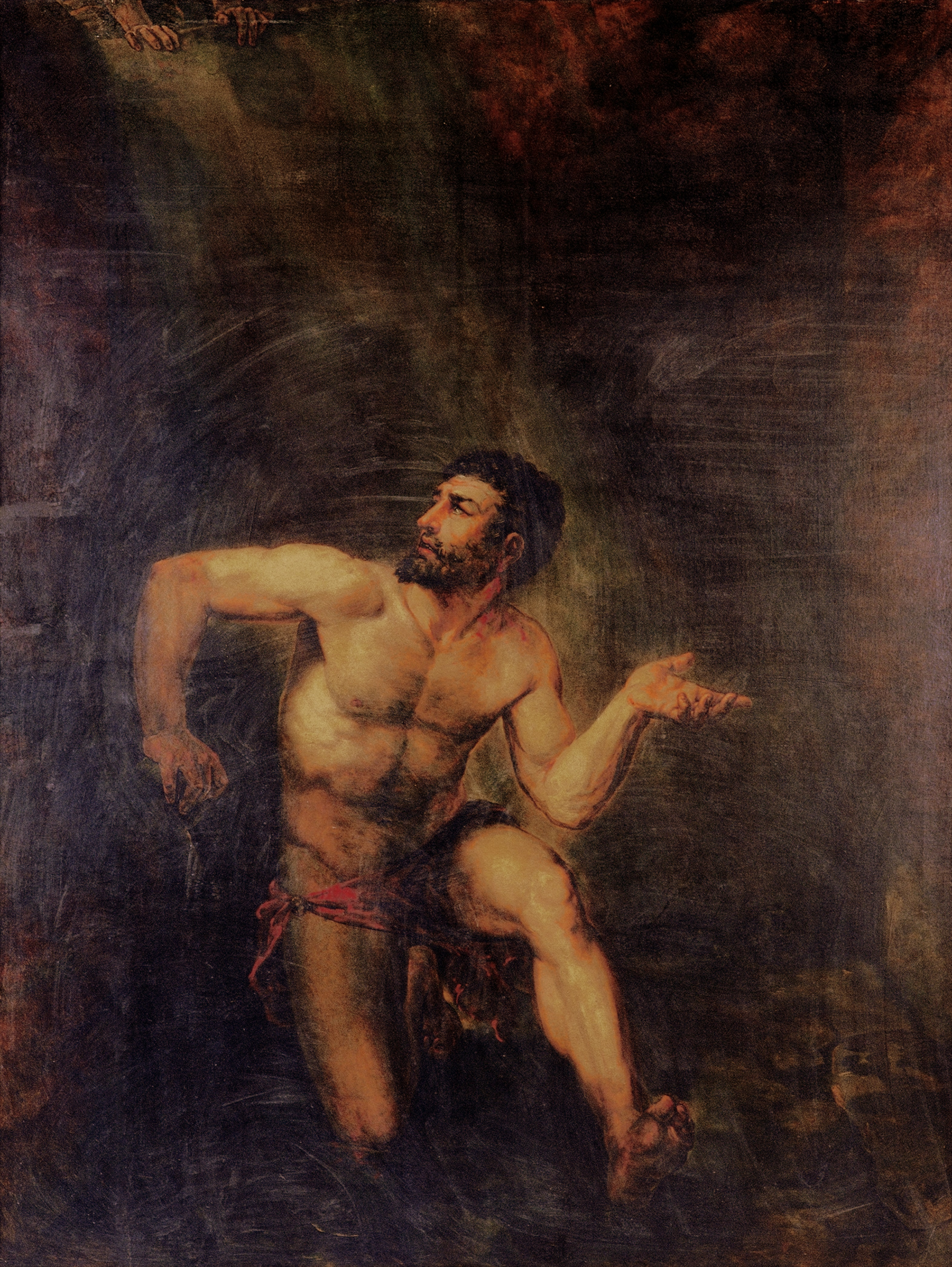
Jugurtha, by Augusto Müller (1815–1883). Museu Nacional de Belas Artes.

When Micipsa died in 118 BC, he was succeeded jointly by his two sons Hiempsal I and Adherbal and Jugurtha, who was very popular among the Numidians. Hiempsal and Jugurtha quarrelled immediately after the death of Micipsa. Jugurtha orchestrated the assassination of his cousin Hiempsal and expelled his other cousin, Adherbal, from Cirta. Adherbal fled to Rome to seek the Senate's protection. However, Jugurtha had already bribed influential Romans, prompting the Senate to divide Numidia in 114 BC: western Numidia was given to Jugurtha, while Adherbal retained the eastern portion. Jugurtha, having married the daughter of Bocchus, king of the western Mauri, amassed a large army and invaded Adherbal's territory in 112 BC. Adherbal retreated to Cirta, where he endured a two-year siege. Starving, he surrendered, but Jugurtha executed him along with many Italians living in the city. Summoned before the Senate for this act, Jugurtha escaped punishment by bribing senators. Before leaving Rome, he assassinated Massiva, the son of Gulussa, who had lodged complaints against him. As he departed, Jugurtha famously declared, "O venal city, doomed to perish if it finds a buyer!"

Determined to end Jugurtha's defiance, Rome sent the propraetor Aulus against him in 109 BC. However, Aulus was ambushed near Suthul and forced to pass under the yoke with his soldiers. Consul Metellus then took command, leading a victorious battle against Jugurtha's forces near Theveste (Tebessa) . Jugurtha resorted to guerrilla warfare against Metellus whose troops were constantly harassed across Numidia. Later, Metellus was compelled to retreat near Zama in 109 BC.

In 108 BC, after regrouping, Metellus invaded Numidia, pushing Jugurtha's Berber forces into retreat and capturing Thala. Jugurtha fled to the Gaetulians and sought aid from Bocchus. Metellus was recalled and replaced by Consul Marius, who led an army of 50,000 men. Marius defeated the combined forces of Jugurtha and Bocchus near Sitifis after a three-day battle and returned to Cirta. Bocchus sought peace and, at the urging of Marius's lieutenant Sulla, betrayed Jugurtha. Luring his son-in-law into his camp, Bocchus handed Jugurtha over to the Romans in 106 BC. On January 1, 104 BC, Marius celebrated a triumph in Rome, with the captured Jugurtha paraded in chains. That same evening, Jugurtha was thrown into the Tullianum prison, where he soon died from cold and starvation.

=== Divided kingdom ===
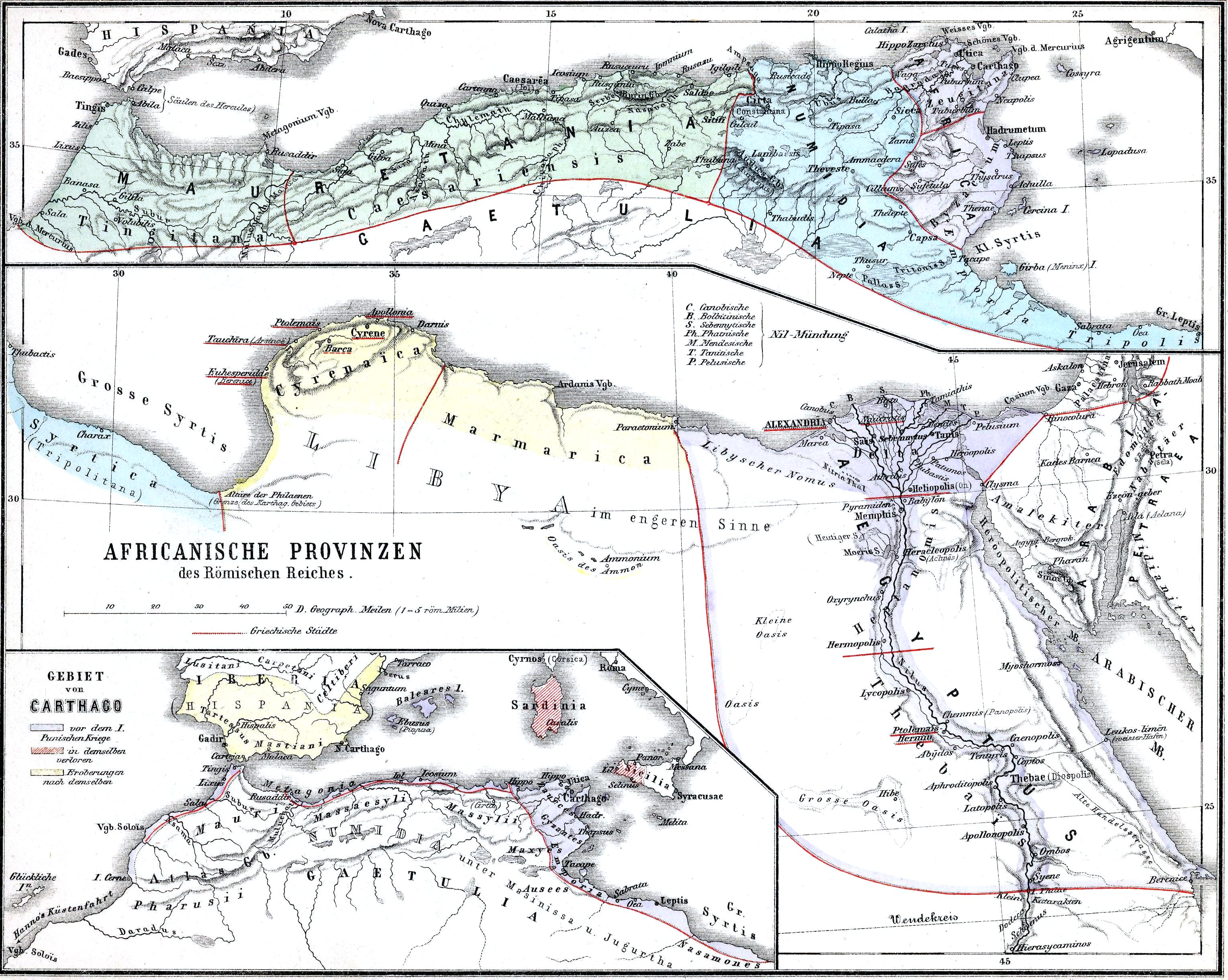
Northern Africa under Roman rule: Africa (purple), Numidia (blue), Mauretania (green)

After the death of Jugurtha, western Numidia, which was now called Mauretania, was added to the lands of Bocchus I. Meanwhile, Gauda, another son of Manastabal who had remained loyal to Rome, was granted central Numidia. After Gauda's death shortly thereafter, his sons Hiempsal II and Hiarbas divided their father's kingdom, ruling under Roman supervision. These Numidian and Mauretanian kings, as Roman protégés, frequently traveled to Rome, where their children were often educated and held as hostages to ensure their loyalty. Fluent in Latin and living according to Roman customs, they supported the arts, beautified their cities in Roman style, and developed their lands, which supplied Italy with a variety of agricultural products. Italians were also settled in fertile regions of Berber lands, often on lands confiscated from the indigenous population. This contributed to the increasing Romanization of North Africa.

The kings of Numidia and Mauretania often took advantage of Roman internal conflicts to settle their own disputes. During the civil war between Marius and Sulla, Marius, exiled by Sulla, sought refuge with Hiarbas, while Hiempsal II supported the dictator Sulla in 88 BC. Hiarbas, with the help of Marius's supporters, defeated his brother Hiempsal and seized his kingdom. To counter Hiarbas and the Marian faction he had revived in Africa, Sulla sent Gnaeus Pompey with six legions. Bocchus supported Pompey's forces with a large contingent of Mauretanian cavalry commanded by Gauda, the son of his son Bogud. Hiarbas, defeated by Pompey and besieged in Bulla Regia, was eventually forced to surrender to Gauda and was executed after enduring severe torture. Hiempsal II regained his kingdom and was granted Hiarbas's former territory in 81 BC. Around the same time, Bocchus died, and Mauretania was divided between his two sons: Bocchus II, who ruled the eastern part of the kingdom with the old Punic city of Iol as his capital, and Bogud, who inherited the western part with Tingi as its center.

=== Roman civil war and the end of the Numidian Kingdom ===
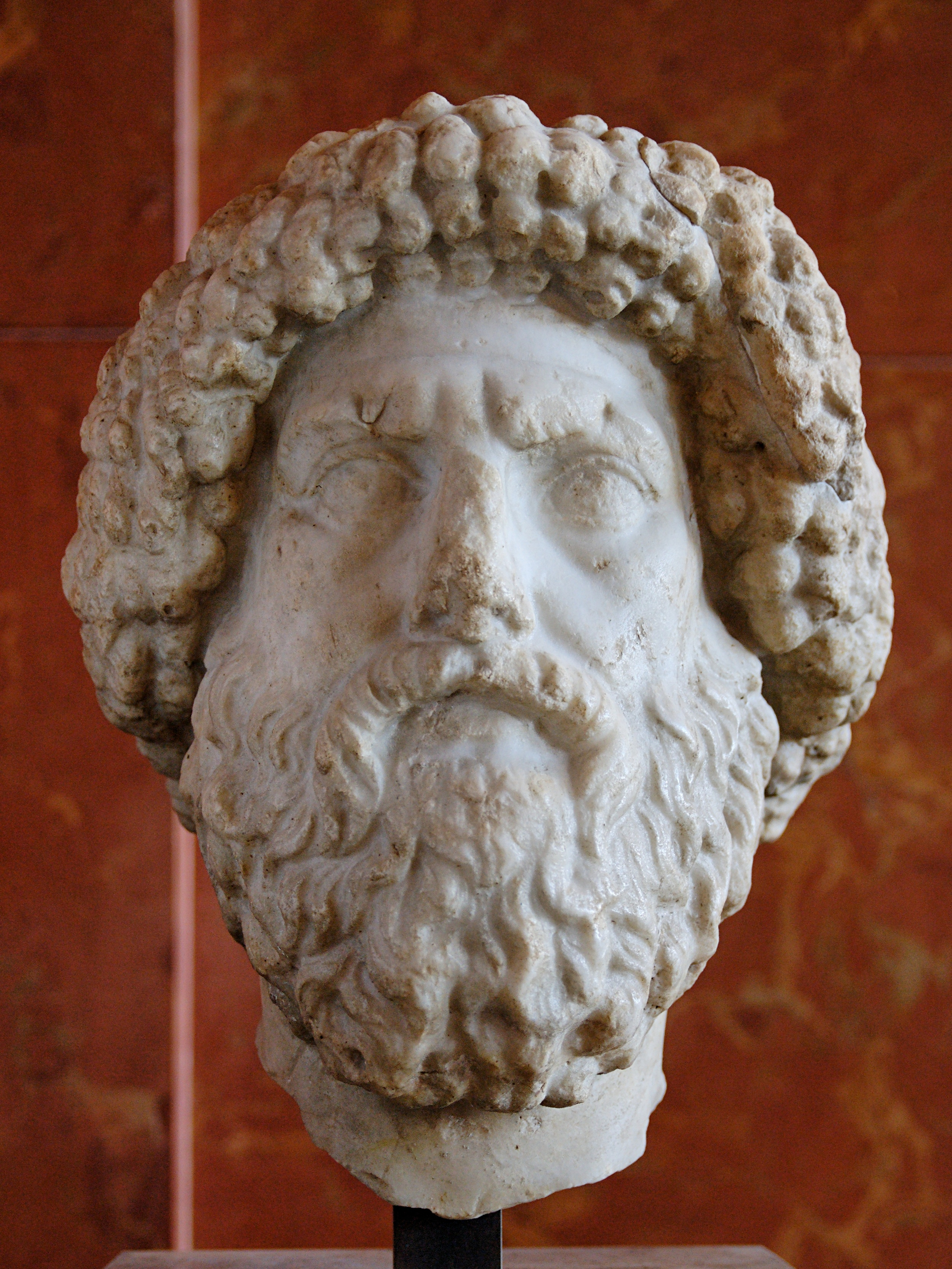
Roman marble bust of Juba I from Cherchell, Algeria. Louvre Museum

Juba, succeeding his father Hiempsal II in 50 BC, sought to take advantage of the civil war between Caesar and Pompey to free himself from Roman control. From the city of Hippo, which he made his capital, he rallied exiles who helped him organize his native troops effectively. After Caesar took Italy from the Senate's faction, Attius Varus, a lieutenant of Pompey and leader of the senatorial army, proclaimed his general's authority in Africa and allied with Juba. Together, they defeated the army of Gaius Scribonius Curio, Caesar's lieutenant, at the Battle of the Bagradas in July 49 BC. Following Pompey's orders, Varus blocked African ports to halt shipments of goods, leading to famine in Italy, where even slaves began to starve. However, an agreement was reached between the rival leaders, who, realizing the need to avoid depopulating Italy, eventually neutralized the food embargo.

In the meanwhile, the Alexandrian war in Ptolemaic Egypt ended favorably for Caesar, who installed Cleopatra as queen of Egypt, and moved on to suppress a revolt in Armenia. The remnants of Pompey's forces, having regrouped in Africa under Varus, were joined by Labienus (a former lieutenant of Caesar), Metellus Scipio (Pompey's father-in-law), Afranius, Porcius Cato, and Gnaeus Pompey. With Juba's support and his Berber troops, the republican army held off Caesar, forcing him to launch a new campaign against them.

From Rome, Caesar negotiated with Publius Sittius, a Campanian adventurer commanding a small army of Italians, Gauls, Spaniards, and Berbers in Africa. Promising Bocchus II and Bogud portions of Juba's territory if they supported him, Caesar landed near Hadrumetum in November 47 BC. Initially outnumbered, with only 5,000 soldiers against his opponents' 60,000, Caesar failed to take Hadrumetum but gained the allegiance of Ruspina and Leptis Parva. Meanwhile, his quaestor Sallustius Crispus captured the Cercina Islands, a key supply base for Pompey's forces. Sittius captured Cirta, threatening Juba's rear and forcing him to divert forces to deal with the insurgent Gaetulians. Reinforced with 30,000 men at Ruspina, Caesar besieged Thapsus. On February 6, 46 BC, he decisively defeated the allied forces attempting to relieve the city. Juba, attempting to reach Zama-Regia, found its gates closed and was killed by a slave as Caesar entered the city in triumph. Scipio, cornered by Sittius's sailors in the Gulf of Hippo, stabbed himself and drowned.

Victorious, Caesar sent Juba I's son to Rome, where he was educated in Roman culture and loyalty to its power. Caesar annexed eastern Numidia into the Roman province of Africa Nova, appointing his lieutenant Sallustius Crispus as governor. Sallust exploited the province, amassing wealth under the pretext of punishing it for supporting Pompey. Bocchus II was granted additional territory in Mauretania Sitifensis, while Bogud received western Numidia. Sittius, made legate, was awarded Cirta and its dependencies, taken from Masanasses, an ally of Juba. The surviving republican leaders fled to Spain, where Caesar, reinforced by Berber contingents under Bogud, defeated the Pompeian forces at Munda the following year. This marked the end of significant resistance to Caesar. Eastern Numidia was annexed in 46 BC to create a new Roman province, Africa Nova. Western Numidia was also annexed as part of the province Africa Nova after the death of its last king, Arabio, in 40 BC, and subsequently the province (except of western Numidia) was united with province Africa Vetus by Emperor Augustus in 25 BC, to create the new province Africa Proconsularis. During the brief period (30–25 BC) Juba II (son of Juba I) ruled as a client king of Numidia on the territory of former province Africa Nova.

== State organization ==
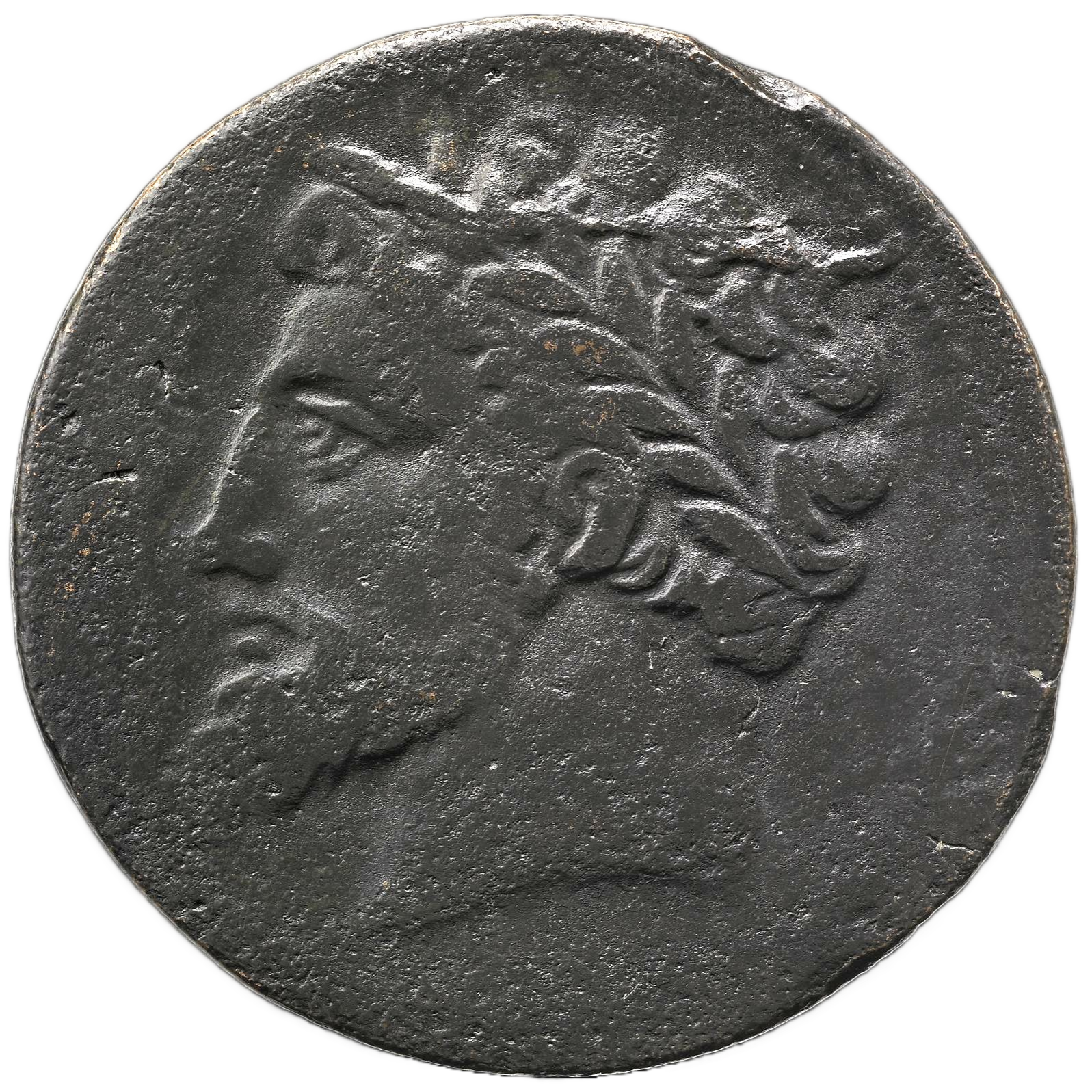
Masinissa (c. 240-148 BC), first king of Numidia (The British Museum)

The ancient Berber kingdom of Numidia was ruled by kings, referred to in Greek and Latin sources as basileus or rex, and occasionally as chiefs. The indigenous Berber title was gld (cognate with the modern Berber aguellid), while the rulers also adopted the Phoenician royal title melek.

Kingship was generally restricted to members of a royal family or lineage. Succession usually passed from brother to brother, or to the eldest surviving member of the royal family, rather than from father to son. After death, kings were commonly deified, a practice that may have been influenced by Hellenistic and Roman models, but could also have stemmed from indigenous ancestor cults.

=== Political power ===
King Massinissa, the first ruler of unified Numidia, sought to embody the full stature of a monarch—almost in the likeness of a god. During his reign, the cult of the divine king emerged strongly; coins were struck with his image, temples were later dedicated to him, and he maintained both an army and a fleet, which even Rome relied on in the East.

The reign of Massinissa (203–148 BC) marked the first true royal power in Numidia. Long and stable, it was secured by the sovereign's political skill, his ability to dominate his family, and to contain the autonomy of tribal chiefs, some of whom allied with Carthage. His authority rested on a confederal system bringing together tribes and communities, jealous of their prerogatives yet integrated into a broader whole. Certain nearby tribes, as well as a few towns, were directly subordinated to him, while the coastal cities, with their Punic heritage, retained a quasi-autonomy, and the Gaetuli remained largely outside his control. He also replaced the traditional tribal succession system with a law ensuring succession by the eldest son, modeled after Hellenistic monarchies. Massinissa had also promoted the idea that "Africa should belong to Africans", which resonated with his Berber subjects, naturally hostile to foreigners.

Massinissa relied on matrimonial alliances and the use of tribal hostages. He also raised an army made up of tribal contingents, which he gradually organized into a more regular force following the Carthaginian model. This structure required solid finances and enabled the king to assert his authority. His power also rested on the unity of the Massylian people and the cohesion of tribes around his person, possibly reinforced by a semi-divine aura. Upon his death, the dynasty remained fragile: succession nominally fell to the eldest male heir, but was often contested by brothers and cousins, as shown by Jugurtha, who imposed himself through force and the elimination of rivals. Thus, although the Numidian kingdom was not a centralized modern state, neither was it merely a patchwork of independent tribes: it represented a genuine political construction, able to resist and negotiate with the great Mediterranean powers before its eventual absorption by Rome.

=== Armed forces ===
==== Numidian cavalry ====
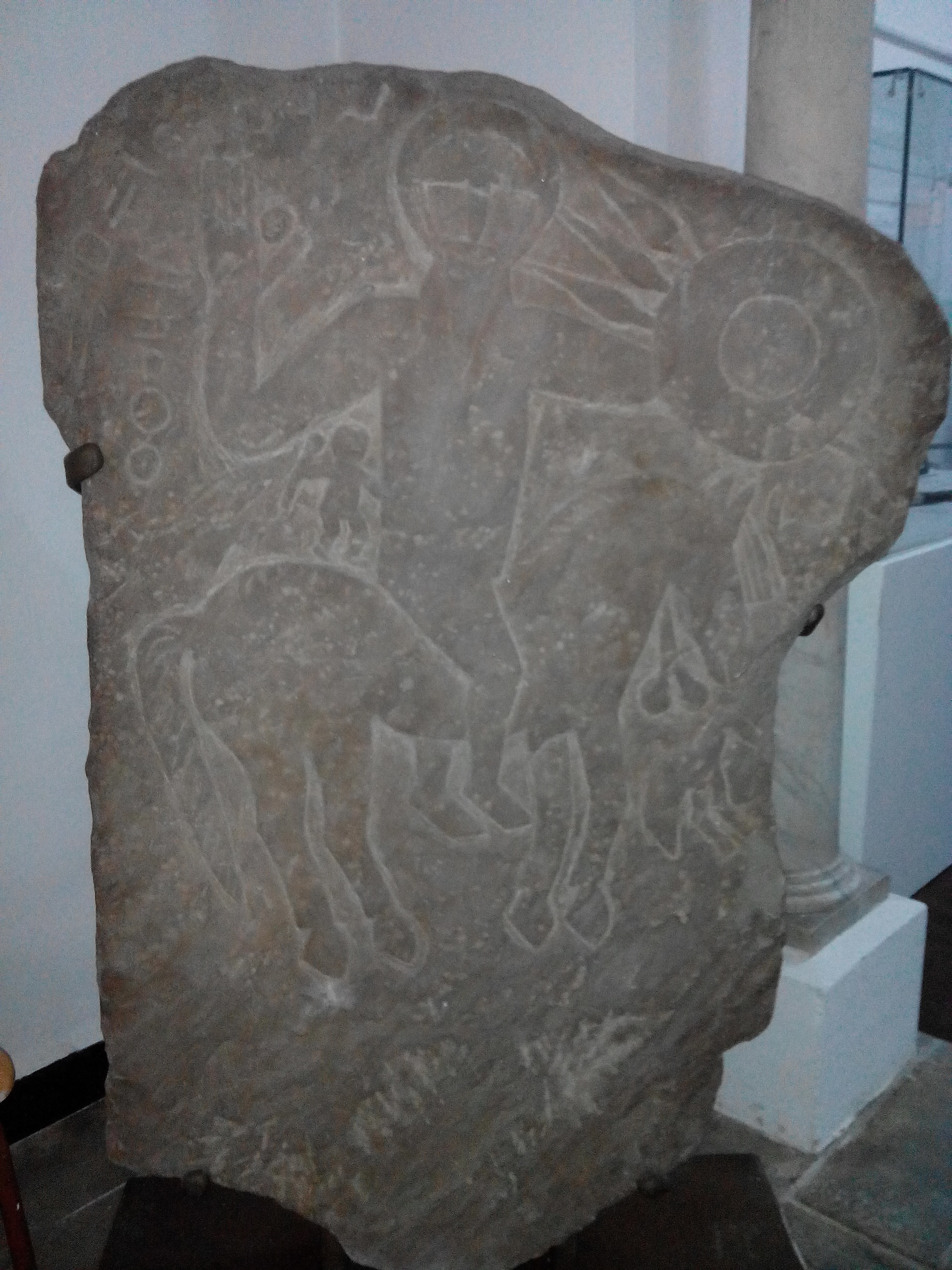
Numidian cavalryman stele

Faced with the military threat of Carthage and Rome, Berber tribes developed a strong Numidian cavalry as a counterweight. This highly mobile, lightly armed, bareback-riding cavalry became the backbone of the Numidian state under kings like Masinissa. Horse-breeding was a major royal activity (Strabo mentions 100,000 foals counted in one year). These cavalry forces were often extra-tribal and served as an important bridge between the king and the broader population. The Numidian cavalry were renowned as the most effective light cavalry in the ancient Mediterranean, playing a crucial role in the armies of both Carthage and Rome. Despite their lack of armor, simple weaponry, and rudimentary tack, their unmatched horsemanship made them invaluable.

Numidian riders, trained from childhood, mastered riding without saddles or bridles, using only a simple rein and wooden rod to guide their hardy, fast, and low-maintenance horses. Their close bond with their mounts enabled remarkable feats, such as switching to a spare horse mid-battle. Their distinctive tactics relied on speed and mobility. Using hit-and-run strategies, they would harass enemy formations with javelins while avoiding direct combat. This approach, developed from the raiding practices of North African nomads, minimized casualties while disrupting opponents. Notably, they excelled at reconnaissance, raiding, and supporting larger armies by keeping enemies off-balance. Numidian cavalry played pivotal roles in major conflicts, such as Hannibal's campaigns during the Second Punic War and Scipio Africanus' victory at Zama in 202 BC.

After Rome's alliance with the Numidian king Masinissa, these horsemen became essential auxiliaries, fighting in wars across the Mediterranean. Even after Numidia's absorption into the Roman Empire, their tactics and equipment remained largely unchanged, with Numidian cavalry continuing to serve in policing and military campaigns well into the Roman imperial period.

==== Infantry ====
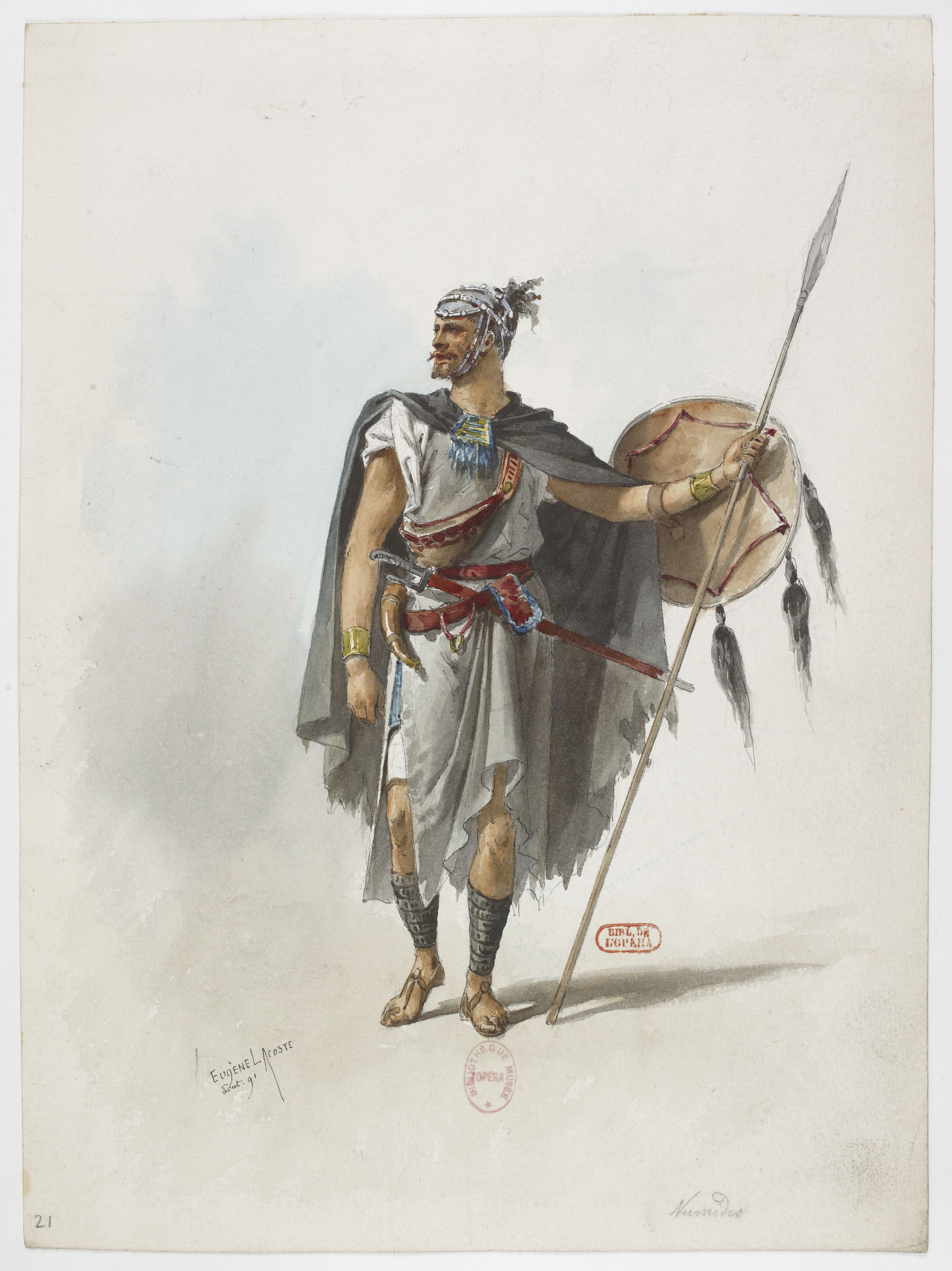
Numidian warrior, by Eugène Lacoste (between 1891 and 1892)

From the time of the Second Punic War onwards, the Numidians regularly employed light infantry alongside their renowned cavalry. In 213 BC, the Masaesylian king Syphax, aware that his forces excelled in cavalry warfare but lacked disciplined infantry, requested Roman help to train his troops. One Roman centurion, Quintus Statorius, remained in Numidia and successfully organized and trained Syphax's men in the Roman manner — teaching them how to form up, manoeuvre, and perform infantry duties, including building fortified camps. This newly trained infantry quickly proved effective, defeating the Carthaginians in their first encounter.

Numidian kings continued to maintain an infantry force throughout the following decades. Infantry were essential not only to counter the heavy infantry of Carthaginian and Roman armies on the battlefield, but also to defend towns and fortifications, a role for which mobile cavalry were poorly suited. Numidian light infantry later served as auxiliaries in the Roman army during the Third Macedonian War, the siege of Numantia (134–133 BC), and even in Julius Caesar's Gallic campaigns. These troops were typically lightly equipped, wearing little or no armour and armed mainly with javelins and small oval shields. They relied on speed and mobility, fighting as skirmishers and avoiding close combat with heavily armoured infantry.

By the mid-1st century BC, the Numidians had developed advanced combined-arms tactics. During Caesar's African campaign against King Juba I, Numidian light infantry worked closely with their cavalry. They would dash forward among the horsemen to hurl javelins at Roman legions, then lure the advancing Romans out of formation by retreating with the cavalry, only for the horsemen to counter-charge and inflict heavy casualties. These innovative tactics proved so effective that Caesar was forced to retrain his legions to counter them.

Although there are occasional mentions of Numidian archers and slingers, the evidence is limited and somewhat uncertain, possibly due to textual corruption in ancient sources.

==== Elephants ====
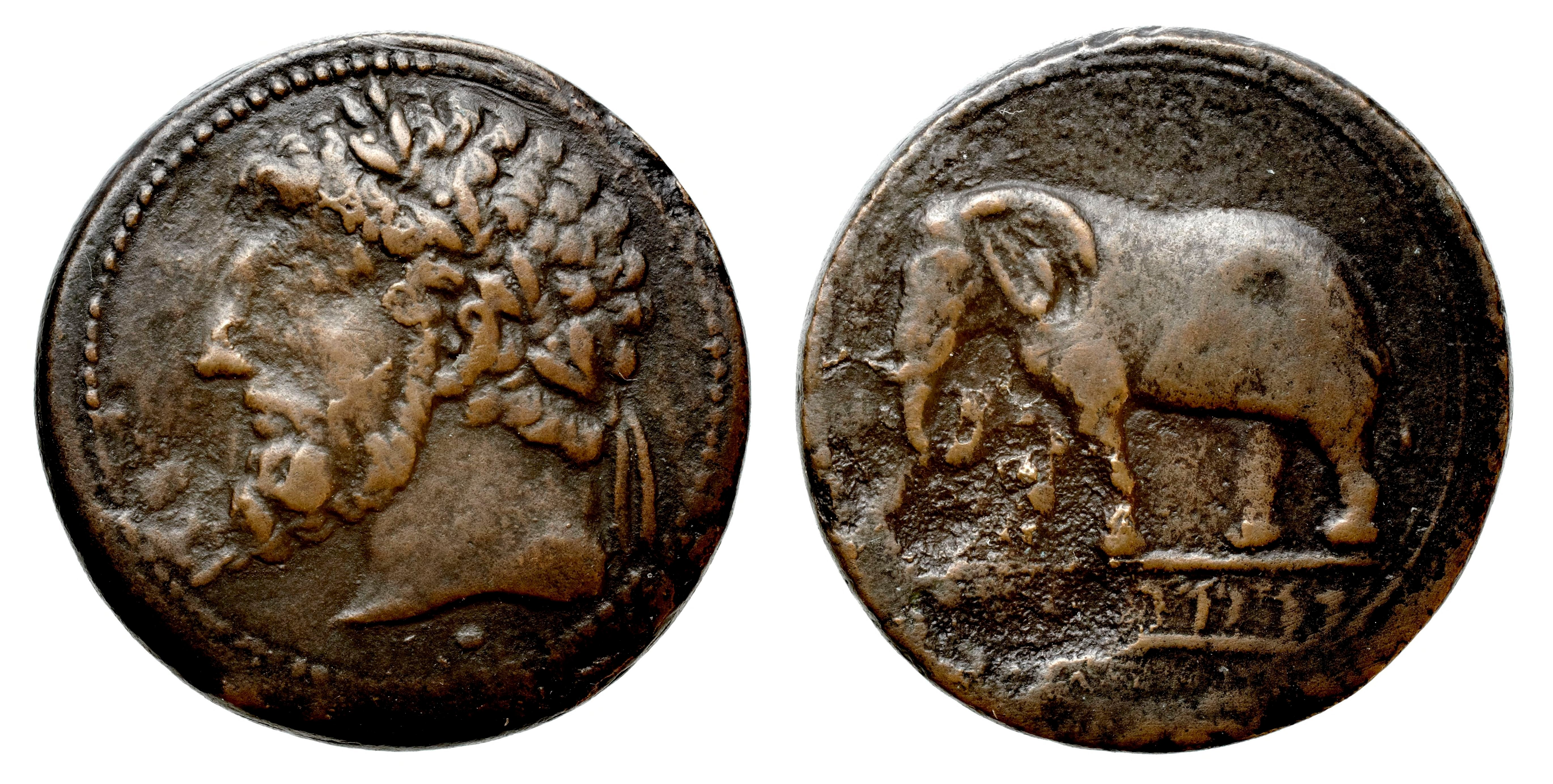
Coin or medal bearing the full name of King Massinissa under an African elephant, on display at the Cirta Museum

The Numidian kings supplied African forest elephants (Loxodonta cyclotis) to the Romans, who used them in key battles such as Pydna (168 BC) and the siege of Numantia (134 BC). These elephants, smaller than bush elephants, were adopted from the Carthaginians, who used them effectively during the Punic Wars, including Hannibal's famous Alpine crossing. Initially, Carthaginian elephants carried only a mahout, as their size and ferocity were sufficient for combat. However, by the 1st century BC, Numidian elephants were equipped with turrets, as seen during Juba I's alliance with the Romans and Caesar's capture of 64 elephants at Thapsus (46 BC). Despite their utility, elephants could be unpredictable, as demonstrated during the siege of Numantia, where one enraged elephant caused chaos, trampling both allies and enemies.

=== State and society ===
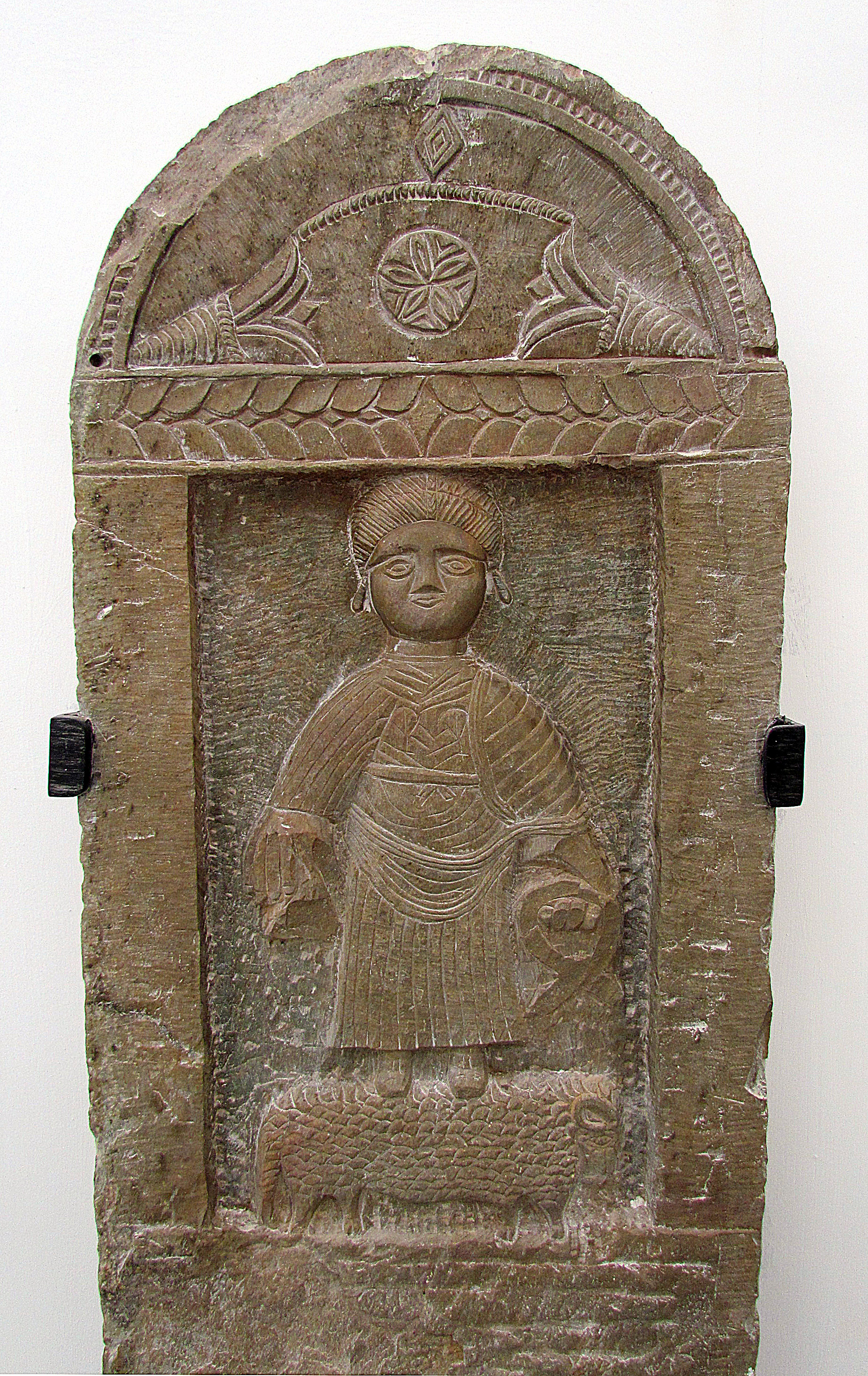
Numidian stele (Bardo Museum)

The Numidians of the classical period were typically organized in segmentary patrilineal (agnatic) kinship groups — extended families and clans. Villages were often made up of these groups, but frequent feuding between clans limited the formation of larger, stable political units and made it difficult to move beyond village-level organization.

This created a structural tension: on one hand, the relatively egalitarian and anarchic tribal society based on kinship and segmentary lineages; on the other, the Hellenistic-style monarchy imposed by Numidian kings (such as Masinissa). The kings ruled more like Hellenistic monarchs than traditional tribal leaders, and this disjunction between indigenous tribal structures and the royal state hindered the development of a strongly institutionalized administrative system. Anthropological observations (e.g., Gellner and Montagne) contrast "egalitarian tribal republics" with autocratic rule by chiefs or kings. There was no natural evolution from tribal anarchy to a centralized Hellenistic state; instead, the Numidian monarchy emerged through emulation of more powerful Mediterranean polities (Carthage and later Rome), rather than through internal development.

The primary link between the monarchy and the villages was the collection of tribute in kind, stored in royal granaries. Masinissa promoted wheat cultivation, exported grain to Rome, and controlled large estates in former Punic territories. Outside these areas, however, tribute rather than direct administration or land ownership remained the main form of royal exploitation. There is little evidence for the development of formal administrative institutions connecting the king to the rural population.

== Religion ==
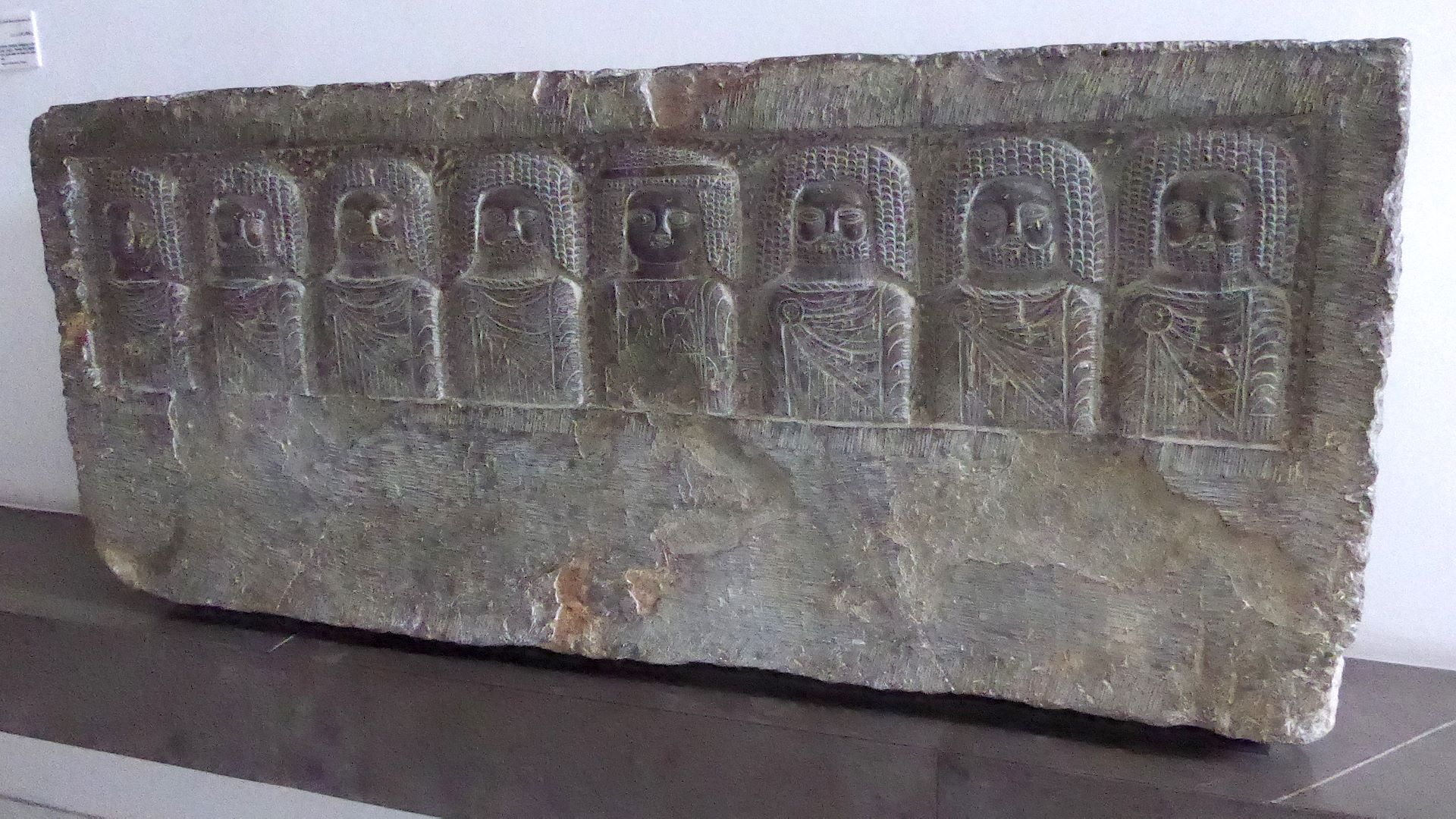
Pantheon of Numidian deities. Bardo Museum

Many deities were archeologically identified within the local practices and customs including funerary burial sites and temples of worship. Documentation of ancient Libyan religious beliefs also relies heavily on Roman-period inscriptions and monuments, which likely reflect earlier local traditions from at least the last centuries of the first millennium BC. Around 50 deity names are attested, alongside numerous site- or group-specific genii (associated with cities, tribes, mountains, caves, or rivers). These deities were predominantly local in character. Local or regional groupings existed, often involving three to eight deities on single monuments. Generic dedications to Dii Mauri probably refer to such local divine collectives, as seen in inscriptions near Béja naming gods like Fudina, Vacurtum, and Varis. Attributes of deities, where known, suggest specialized roles (Macurgum as a healing god with a snake-coiled staff; Vihina linked to childbirth).

=== Royal Divinity and Ancestor Cult ===
Numidian kings occupied a mediating role between the human and supernatural realms, a feature reminiscent of Asiatic tributary states. They assumed importance in the cult of the dead, which was central to Berber antiquity. Ancestor spirits were linked to soil fertility, oracular power, and the future; the Augilae, for instance, treated ancestral spirits as gods, swearing oaths by them and interpreting dreams from tomb incubation as divine responses. Kings were regarded as divine or semi-divine: epigraphic evidence shows living monarchs like Hiempsal, Gulussa, and Juba receiving divine honors, with posthumous deification explicit for figures like Masinissa ("among the gods") and Micipsa ("living of the living"). Monumental sanctuaries near Zama (Kbor Klib) and Simmithu, along with grand tombs, likely served as royal cult sites where deceased kings acted as "super-ancestors," monopolizing communication with spirits and ensuring fertility. The extraordinary sanctuary at Slonta (Cyrenaica) exemplifies the blend of funerary and fertility themes, with intricate carvings of worshippers, animals, snakes, lizards, and phallic symbols, plus altars, incubation benches for dream-oracles, and pig imagery. Such sites highlight the dead's role as intermediaries with the supernatural.

Massinissa, despite his openness to foreign influences, had a profound influence on religion in his kingdom. He did not abandon traditional African beliefs. When he welcomed Roman consul Publius Cornelius Scipio, he expressed his gratitude in a distinctly African manner, saying: "I give thanks to you, O Great Sun, and to you, other gods of the heavens." This invocation highlights his reverence for the solar deity. Some Libyan groups also worshipped celestial bodies such as the Sun and Moon.

Punic influence is evident in Numidian names such as Bonchor and in wider cultural exchanges. Under Massinissa, who was shaped by Greek and Phoenician civilization, the worship of Phoenician and Greek gods was permitted in urban centers, while rural communities continued to honor local Berber gods and spirits. Prominent among these was the cult of Baal Hammon alongside the local deity Tanit (or Tinit), coexisting with numerous other local and foreign divinities.

As an admirer of Greek culture, Massinissa likely introduced the Numidians to the Greek cult of Demeter and Persephone (Ceres), a fertility religion involving rituals aimed at promoting agricultural productivity. These rites often included crude and provocative elements, reflecting their connection to natural cycles and fertility. Massinissa specifically introduced the cult of the Greek goddess Ceres as part of his agricultural policy. This aimed to expand cereal cultivation, shift Numidia from a primarily pastoral society to a major grain-producing region of North Africa, and link agricultural prosperity with royal authority. Classical sources later praised these reforms, noting Numidia's emergence as a key Mediterranean grain supplier. The cult of Ceres persisted after the Roman conquest and was assimilated into the religious life of Roman North Africa, where she became a principal agricultural deity. These developments produced a religious landscape characterized by both continuity and disjunction, with localized pantheons reflecting a blend of indigenous, Punic, Greek, and later Roman elements.

=== Funerary Monuments and Practices ===
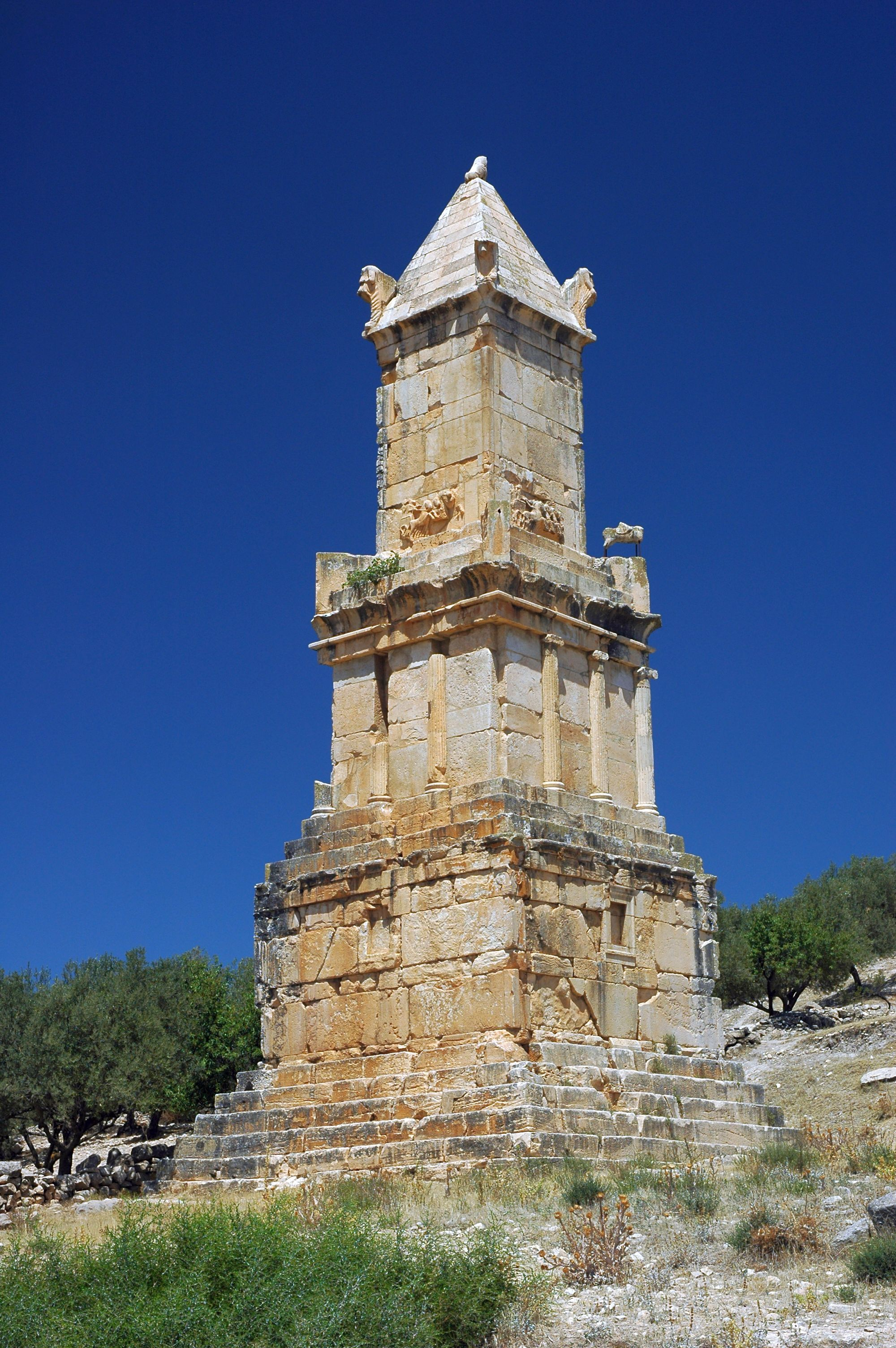
Mausoleum of Thugga, Dougga (Tunisia)

Funerary evidence is abundant but understudied, showing great diversity in form, likely reflecting social status, chronology, and regional traditions. Monuments range from simple stone enclosures and rock-cut haouanet tombs to underground hypogea, tumuli (bazinas), tower-shaped chonchet, and dolmen-like structures grouped in vast necropolises. Multi-chamber megalithic tombs (at Mactar and Ellès) accommodated multiple burials and may represent higher-status collective interments from the 3rd century BC onward.

Religion in Numidia also demonstrates the merging of traditions. Distinctively monumental royal and elite mausoleums show strong Punic and Hellenistic influence: multi-level funerary towers (at Siga, Thugga and El Khroub in 2nd century BC) and massive cylindrical structures with stepped cones, such as the Medracen (near Batna) and Kbour Roumia (near Tipaza). These combined local tumulus elements with imported architectural grandeur, reinforcing the kings' elevated ancestral status.

Unlike the rare and Punic-derived cremation, Inhumation was the dominant rite. Practices varied regionally and socially; primary inhumations, such as articulated bodies in crouched, supine, or extended positions, and secondary inhumations (disarticulated bones after excarnation) occurred side-by-side, even within the same cemeteries or tombs. Children were included across types. Offerings were generally modest—animal bones, pottery (including miniature "microcéramique" vessels), beads, and occasional tools—without weapons. Evidence of ongoing cult includes chambers for stelai and vessels at Mactar, and human bone fragments in domestic contexts (Althiburos), suggesting ancestor veneration within households.

== Agriculture ==
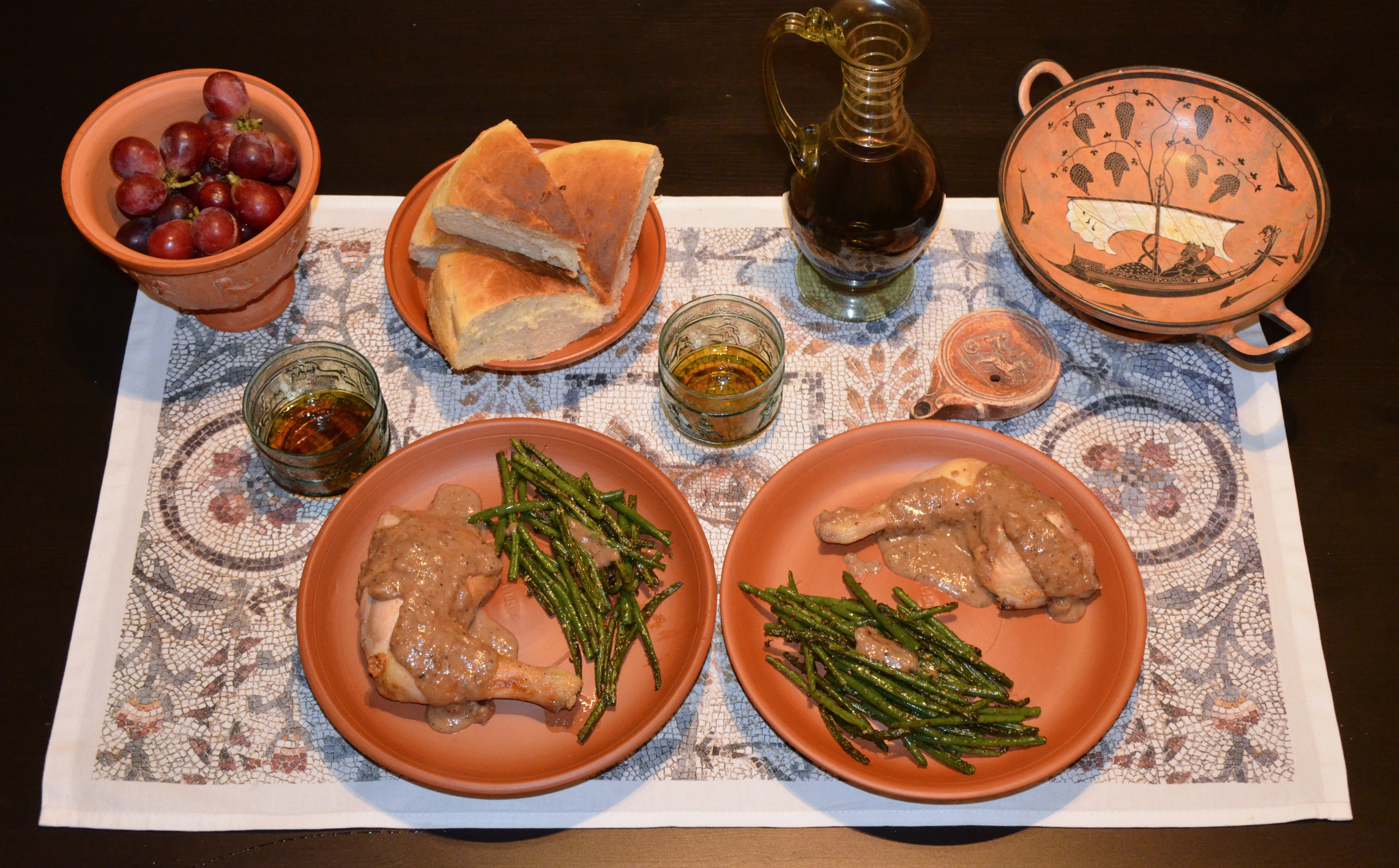
Pullum Numidicum (Numidian Chicken) accompanied with Conchicla Cum faba (Beans with Cumin)

The Numidian kingdom was very famous for its agricultural yield; besides lettuce, beans, and other grains already consumed by Berbers since the dawn of their recorded history, Numidia was very productive when it came to its famously high-quality wheat, very similar to the wheat farmed along the banks of the Egyptian Nile.

=== Grain ===
Strabo states that Massinissa transformed many Berbers into farmers and civilized them. The Massylian kingdom already had extensive agricultural lands, expanded further by his conquests; in some areas the soil was so fertile that simply scratching it after harvest allowed fallen seeds to yield a new crop. Polybius praised his agricultural policy: Massinissa developed the greatly enlarged royal domains and set an example by farming them himself. Towns named with the epithet Regia or Regius (Bulla Regia, Zama Regia, Hippo Regius, Thimida Regia) likely belonged to these royal estates. Diodorus notes that he left each son a fully equipped farm of about 875 hectares. Peace in his kingdom was the key factor that allowed Numidian agriculture to flourish under his rule.

Epigraphic and literary evidence indicates that Numidia had abundant—and likely surplus—cereal production. A Greek inscription records Massinissa’s gift to the temple of Apollo at Delos of 2,796½ medimnoi of grain, which sold for 10,000 drachmas. In 179 BC, King Masinissa of Numidia received a golden crown from the inhabitants of Delos, as he had offered them a shipload of grain. A statue of Masinissa was erected in Delos in his honor, with an inscription by a native from Rhodes. His sons, too, had statues erected on the island of Delos; the King of Bithynia, Nicomedes, had also dedicated a statue to Masinissa.

Livy notes that Massinissa supplied large quantities of wheat to Roman armies during the wars against Philip, Antiochus, and Perseus, including successive shipments of several hundred thousand bushels; In 200 BC, the Roman Army stationed in Macedonia received 17,508 hectoliters of Numidian wheat; in 198 BC, the Roman Army in Greece was sent, once again, the same amount of wheat. In 191 BC, Rome received 26,262 hectoliters of wheat and 21,885 hectoliters of barley; Greece, the same year, received 43,770 hectoliters of wheat and 26,262 hectoliters of barley. Then, in 171 BC, the Roman army in Macedonia received 87,540 hectoliters of wheat. In 170 BC he provided one million bushels for the army in Macedonia. Massinissa's successor Micipsa continued these supplies. Plutarch further records that grain was sent to Roman troops in Sardinia.

In total Rome received:

- in 200 BC: 14,000 tonnes of wheat and 10,500 tonnes of barley.
- in 198 BC: 14,000 tonnes of wheat.
- in 191 BC: 56,000 tonnes of wheat and 28,900 tonnes of barley.
- in 170 BC: 70,000 tonnes of wheat.

These numbers only represent a fraction from the reserves of the kingdom of Massinissa. His contributions to the Romans in 170 BC appear to be only a fraction of the kingdom's total production, as he was upset by Rome's decision to pay for the provided wheat that year. Massinissa hadn't laid his hands yet on the fertile lands of the Emporia (North West Ancient Libya) nor the great plains full of fertile soil yet; generally, barley was his kingdom's main produce, as they grew barley in light, mountainous and hilly soil which is suitable for its cultivation.

=== Vegetables ===
Tiddis, Numidia. Modern Constantine province.

The ancient Maghrebians knew and exploited wild vegetables, which they later domesticated. Wild broad beans were collected and preserved; charred seeds found in a cave on the summit of Jebel el-Qirda near Béjaïa indicate a local origin. In 1893 the physician Trabut and his colleague Battondier observed women near Sersou (Djelfa) gathering a small wild bean identical to specimens recovered from prehistoric sites; the botanist Munby also recorded natural stands of the same plant near Oran.

Other vegetables included several edible onions (raw or cooked), artichokes (both wild and cultivated forms, the region being their original homeland), garlic (praised by Pliny for its medicinal properties and multi-layered skin; Mediterranean, possibly Egyptian, origin), leeks, mustard, gourds, courgettes, melons and cucumbers. Phoenician expansion and later Carthaginian contact helped spread and intensify the cultivation of these crops.

=== Fruit trees ===
Although cereals dominated production and export, fruit trees were diverse and abundant.

Olive: Archaeological evidence shows early use of the wild olive (azbuj). Local people harvested it and extracted oil long before the Phoenicians introduced grafting techniques that gradually replaced wild trees with cultivated orchards. Some scholars (Camps) argue that bud-grafting was already practised before the Carthaginians arrived; the method known as crown-grafting is still used in Kabylia today. Under Massinissa the Numidians recovered ancestral olive groves and presses from Carthaginian territory; these continued into Roman times, though the scale of oil exports remains uncertain because of periodical instability.

Date palm: Herodotus mentioned Saharan oases in eastern Libya as early as the 5th century BC. Camps and rock-art scenes in the Tassili (Wadi Djerat) confirm that the palm was already present in the desert before the Phoenicians. The tree’s range stretched from Tacape south to Fezzan, east to Siwa and west toward the Pillars of Hercules. Numidian kings, especially Massinissa, inherited southern oases; friendly relations between northern and southern populations are reflected in the frequent use of palm fronds as symbols of victory on coins, seals and stelae.

Other fruits: Figs, vines, almonds, apples and pomegranates were partly wild and partly introduced or improved by Phoenicians and Carthaginians, who grafted existing stocks, brought new varieties (especially pomegranate and apple) and encouraged local cultivation. Cirta and coastal towns such as Gunugu (Gouraya) became important production centres. Royal coinage attests to a flourishing wine industry whose quality ranked second only to Cretan wine and was a major Mediterranean export.

== Industry ==
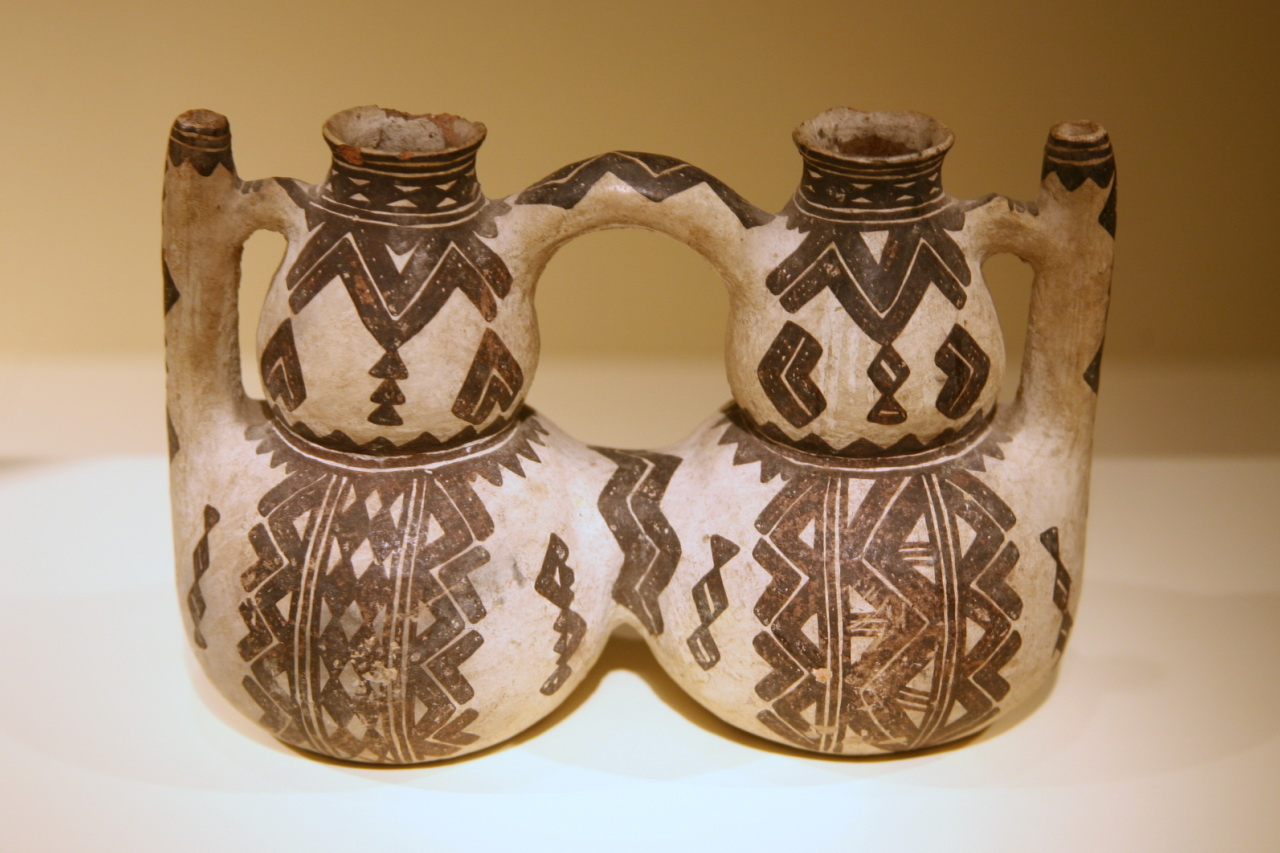
Ceramic Kabyle double vessel

Pottery and coinage are among the most important surviving sources for understanding Numidian industries. The large quantities of pottery and coins discovered throughout the territories associated with Numidia indicate the existence of specialized workshops devoted to their production.

=== Pottery ===
Pottery was among the earliest crafts practiced by the Numidians. Large quantities have been recovered from burial sites, particularly those dating to the Early Historic and Protohistoric periods. This pottery displays characteristics that, in some respects, survived into modern times, both in its manufacturing techniques and in its decorative motifs. Among the most distinctive motifs is the triangle, which occupies an important place in the decorative repertoire of North African pottery.

Pottery production was common both in rural villages and on the outskirts of larger towns. Rural women fashioned everyday vessels such as cooking pots, bowls, dishes and jugs by hand, firing them in open fires; the resulting ware was rough and easily broken. From a technical perspective, Numidian pottery was primarily handmade, including vessels shaped in moulds or formed manually. In contrast, professional potters working near clay sources employed the wheel and proper kilns to create stronger, more carefully finished pieces. The shapes and ornamentation of this better-quality pottery drew heavily on Carthaginian models, appealing to town-dwellers receptive to outside cultural influences. Finds from the cemeteries of Vaga, Thubursicu Bure (Téboursouk), Dougga, Bulla Regia and Cirta closely match the plain ceramics typical of Carthage’s later burial grounds. In terms of surface treatment and decoration, it can broadly be divided into painted and unpainted pottery. Painted examples employ various colors as part of their decorative schemes, while older, unpainted pottery was decorated through incisions, grooves, projections, and other relief or recessed patterns. Some of its forms dating back to the Neolithic period.

Archaeological studies have also made it possible to distinguish between funerary pottery and pottery intended for everyday use. Funerary vessels were generally less carefully manufactured than those produced for domestic purposes. Among the principal archaeological sites where large quantities of funerary pottery have been discovered are Gastal at Tebessa, Roknia near Guelma, Tiddis near Constantine, and Beni Messous near Algiers.

=== Coinage ===
Bronze coin of King Syphax

The production of coinage was introduced into the Maghreb through Phoenician merchants, who had themselves adopted the practice of minting coins from the Greeks of Sicily. Scholarly interest in Numidian coinage dates back to 1843, when the Danish scholars Falbe and Lindgren began studying it. Later researchers, including Müller, produced important works that became fundamental references for the study of Numidian coins.

King Syphax is generally regarded as the first Numidian ruler to issue coins bearing his own name. Large quantities of coins bearing his name and portrait have been discovered, as well as coins associated with his son Vermina. One of the notable characteristics of Numidian coinage is the extensive use of relatively common metals, particularly lead, copper, and bronze, with silver occurring in much smaller quantities. This composition corresponds to the large number of copper- and bronze-based coins discovered at the principal Numidian centers of Cirta (Constantine) and Siga in western Algeria.

The availability of lead and copper deposits in Numidia facilitated the production of these metals locally, whereas silver and gold were generally obtained from outside the region. The extensive use of less durable metals, however, affected the quality and preservation of Numidian coins, many of which were particularly vulnerable to oxidation and corrosion.

Numidian coins commonly bear the names and portraits of rulers, with inscriptions generally written in the Punic script. Their reverse sides frequently display representations of animals, especially the elephant and horse, or agricultural motifs such as ears of grain and bunches of grapes. The meaning of the horse motif, which is among the most common and characteristic images found on Numidian coinage, has been debated by scholars. A plausible interpretation is that it reflects the importance attached to the horse by Numidian rulers because of its military and economic significance. The horse was an essential component of warfare and elite status, while horse breeding and related activities also formed an important part of the economy and political power of Numidian society.

== Culture ==
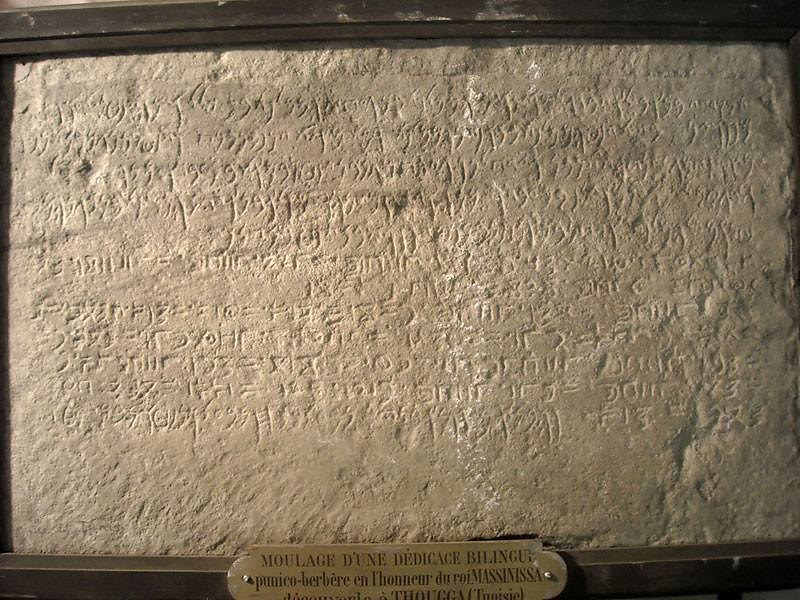
Louvre cast of the Dougga Temple bilingual (AO 4611). Original discovered in 1904, cast thought to be 1920 (Punic and Libyan)

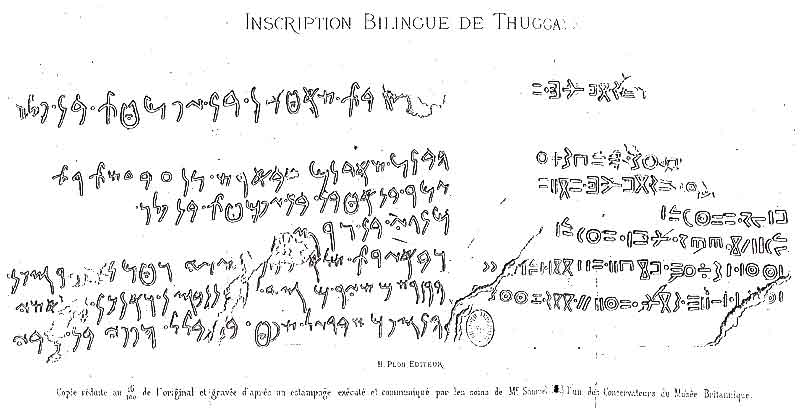
Bilingual inscription (Numidian and Punic) from Thugga, Dougga, Tunisia

Numidian culture developed at the crossroads of indigenous Berber traditions and Punic influences brought by Carthage, especially through military ties, intermarriage, and education at Carthage. Even after Carthage's political decline in 201 BC, Punic influence continued. Numidian towns adopted punic-style institutions, such as magistrates called sufetes.

Far from being passive receivers of a ready-made civilization, the Numidians actively participated in shaping what became a distinctive North African culture. The Numidian capital city of Cirta embodied a Punic-Numidian cultural fusion enriched by Greek influence. This was illustrated by the votive stelae dedicated to the gods of the city Baal Hammon and Tanit, discovered in the Constantinian suburb of El-Hofra and dated to the 3rd–2nd centuries BC.

=== Prominent characters from Numidia ===
Numidia was a vibrant center of learning, it produced some of antiquity's most influential minds, leaving a lasting mark on philosophy, theology, science, and literature some of them include:

Character	Origin	Role
Apuleius	Madauros (M'Daourouch)	Orator, writer, novelist and philosopher
Saint Augustine	Thagaste (Souk Ahras)	Christian theologian and philosopher
Maximus of Madaurus	Madauros (M'Daourouch)	Orator and grammarian
Mastanbal	Cirta (Constantine)	Olympics Champion
Marcus Cornelius Fronto	Cirta (Constantine)	Orator
Donatus of Casae Nigrae	Theveste (Tebessa)	Christian theologian and philosopher
Juba II	Hippo Regius (Annaba)	Polymath, Writer and Geographer
Lactantius	Cirta (Constantine)	Christian writer and orator

=== Language ===
Language played a central role in the aforementioned cultural fusion. The official language of the Numidian and Mauretanian kingdoms was Punic, used for royal inscriptions, coin legends, and religious dedications. Numidia even developed into a center of Punic literature, with King Hiempsal II writing history in Punic after 146 BC, when the Romans had presented Massinissa's heirs with Carthage's library. Even centuries after the fall of Carthage, Punic remained alive; Saint Augustine testified that farmers around Hippo still spoke it in his time.

Alongside Punic, the Libyco-Berber script was also in use, an alphabet that survives among the Tuareg as Tifinagh, a name probably meaning "the Punic letters." Only at Dougga did the Numidian kings attempt to use Libyco-Berber in official inscriptions, showing the coexistence of both linguistic traditions.

The Numidian kings and elites were well-versed in Greek, which was then the international language of diplomacy and refined culture across the Mediterranean, including in Rome. When Scipio Aemilianus captured Carthage in 146 BC, he conversed in Greek with King Massinissa, and the latter's descendants also spoke Greek. By the 1st century BC, Numidia had its own diplomatic and cultural ties with the Greek world.

=== Architecture ===
The term "Royal Numidian Architecture" was coined for the monuments that were constructed by the Numidian kings. These monuments consist of tombs, tumuli and sanctuaries. Some examples of these structures are the mausoleum of Thugga, the tomb of Beni Rhenane, a tomb at Henchur Burgu in Djerba as well as two tumulus tombs known as the Medracen and the Royal Mausoleum of Mauretania. There are also altars that were built at Simitthu and Kbor Klib. All of these monuments were built within the area ruled by Massinissa and his descendants.

Numidian urban life reflected this same cultural blend. Historian Gabirel Camps stresses that cities such as Cirta, Siga, and Volubilis were not Carthaginian colonies, but authentic centers of Punic culture. They displayed Punic urban planning, sanctuaries, and inscriptions while retaining Berber characteristics. Architecture provides striking examples of this synthesis. The Medracen mausoleum, built in the 4th or 3rd century BC, is a vast royal tomb that combines the Berber form of the stepped tumulus with Punic and Hellenistic features such as Doric columns, Egyptian-style cornices, and cedar ceilings. Other mausolea at Dougga, Maktar, and Khroub illustrate the same mixture. These monuments show that Numidian elites were already deeply Punicized well before Carthage's destruction, while still maintaining indigenous forms.

Massinissa was likely the first Numidian ruler to Hellenize his court, turning it into a cultural center visited by figures like Polybios and Ptolemy VIII. His coinage displayed Greek artistic traits (a diademed bust, the elephant symbol of Numidian royalty). He may have pioneered the use of Numidian marble and adopted Hellenistic-style architecture, including monumental tombs.

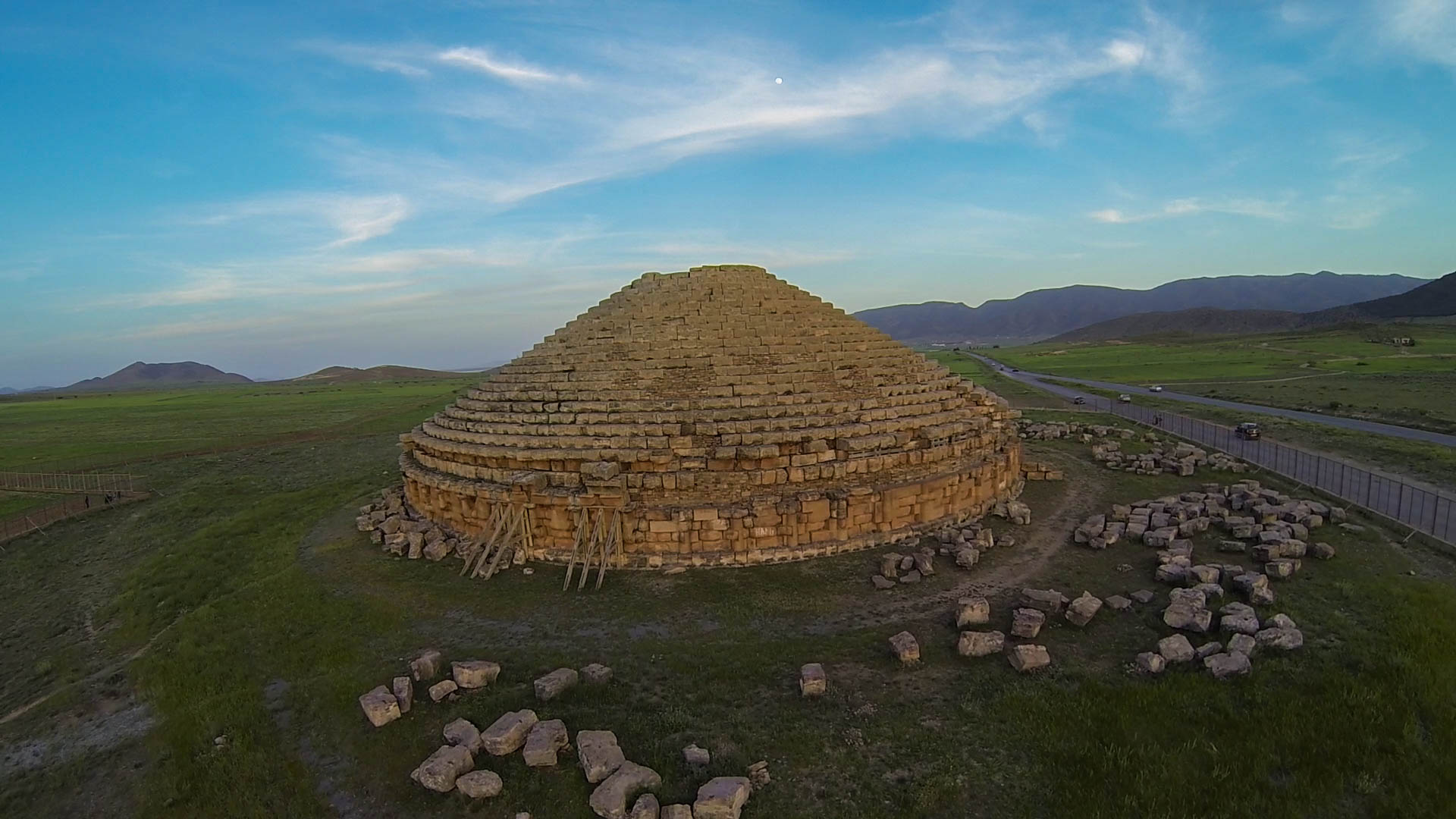
Royal mausoleum-temple of the Berber Numidian Kings (Medracen), Batna (Algeria)

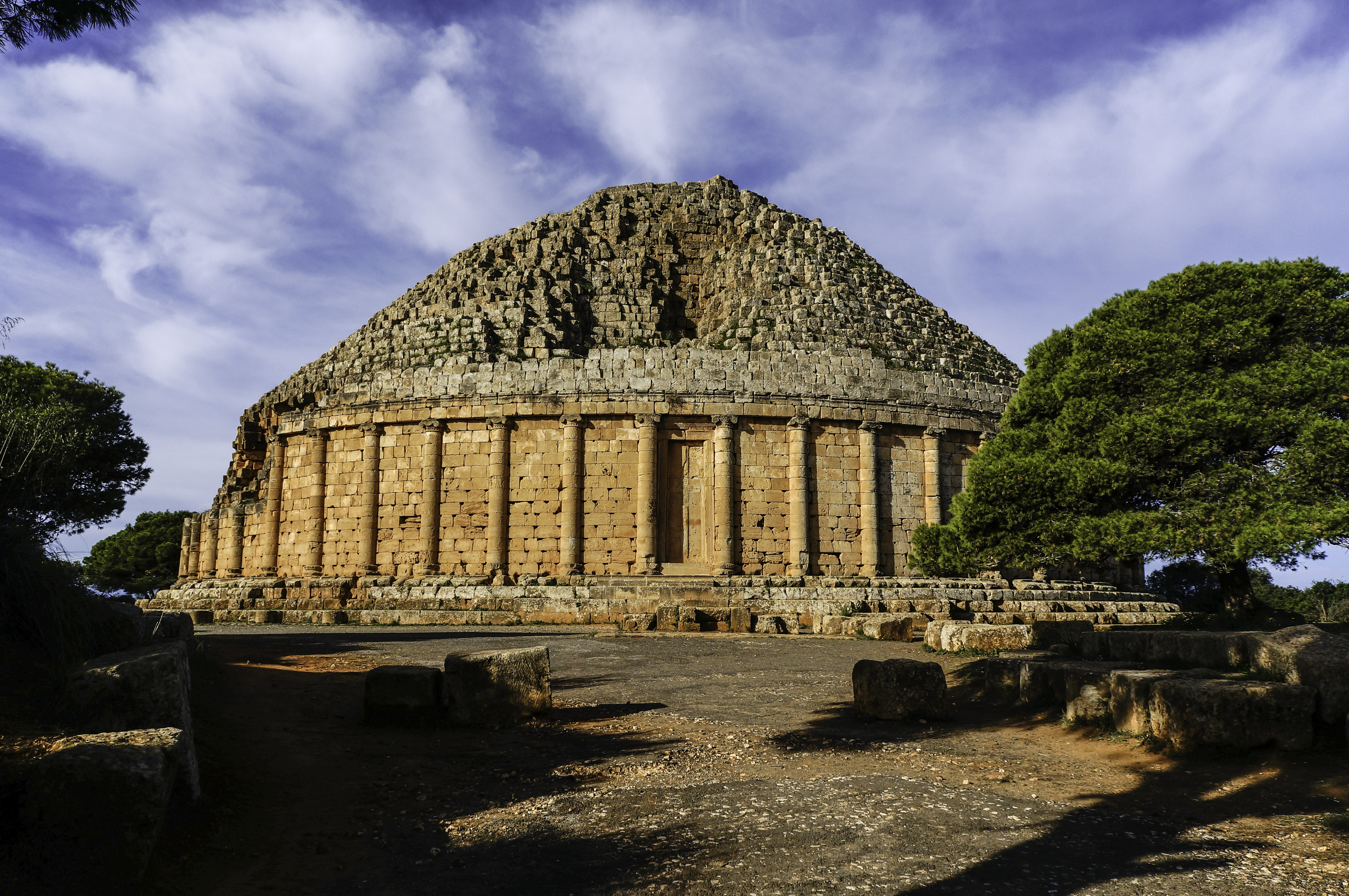
Royal mausoleum of Mauretania, Tipaza (Algeria)

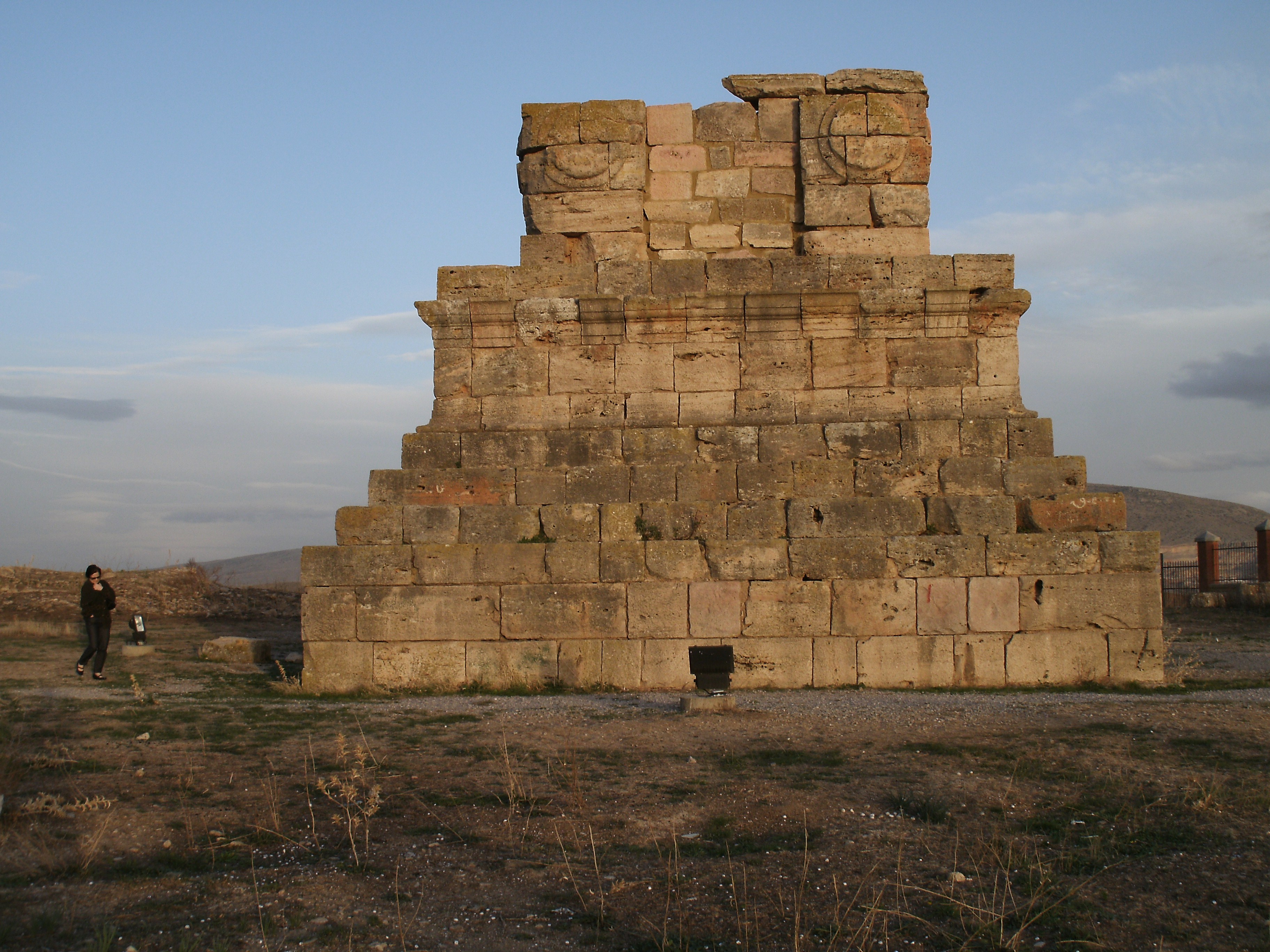
Tomb of Micipsa, El-Khroub (Algeria)

== Trade ==
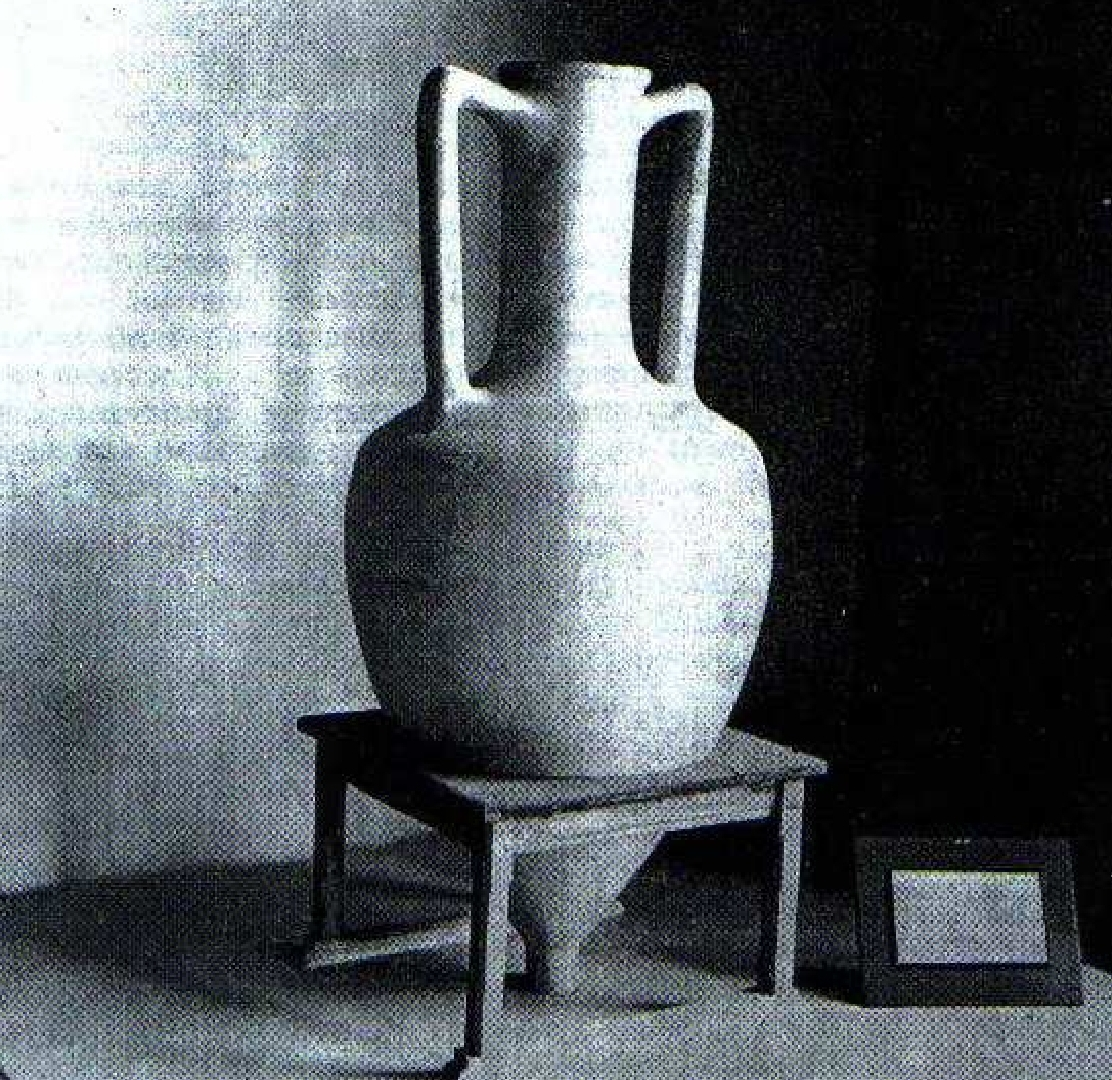
Rhodean Greek amphora that dates to circa 180 B.C. in Cirta Museum

The Numidian kingdom maintained trade relations with the Iberian Peninsula, Carthage, and Rome, as well as the Greek world, including Rhodes, Athens, and Delos. Grain was the primary export. Historian Camps, referencing Livy, provides detailed records of Numidian grain exports to Rome: 14,000 quintals of wheat and 10,500 quintals of barley in 200 BC, 14,000 quintals of wheat in 198 BC, 56,000 quintals of wheat and 28,000 quintals of barley in 191 BC, and 70,000 quintals of wheat in 170 BC.

Massinissa used to provide to the population of Rhodes Toja wood and Ivory, in Cirta multiple Rhodian amphorae from the 2nd century B.C were found in burial sites and one of them carries the inscription (Sodamos). Massinissa encouraged Greek merchants to settle in his cities and welcomed figures like the historian Polybius. During his reign, North Africa established direct trade connections with both the East and the West, bypassing Carthage. This transformation was largely due to Massinissa's efforts.

Numidia took over most of the famous Carthaginian ports which were one of the most important in the mediterranean, the famous Roman orator and historian Cicero tells us that the Numidian king had a war navy to protect his trade, in one story, the fleet of Massinissa sailed to Malta and confiscated large ivory elephant pillars from the temple of Juno and returned to Numidia and gave it as a prize to Massinissa. When the king knew about the origin of the gift, he prepared a nimble fleet of five ships and sent it back to where it came from. This funny story tells us that not only Massinissa had enough ships to perform tasks at will but also these fleets were functioning outside of African shorelines towards the central Mediterranean.

== Major cities ==
Massinissa encouraged the urbanization of the Berbers as new farmers settled in fortified towns; he gave the new cities an organization inspired by that of the Phoenician cities, with magistrates called suffetes. Gabriel Camps provides a detailed overview of the main cities of the Numidian kingdom:

- Capitals: Cirta, Siga, Iol, Zama.
- Royal Cities: Thimida Regia, Zama Regia, Bulla Regia, Hippo Regius.
- Seats of the kingdom's "treasuries" or chief towns of fiscal districts: Mactar, Thirmida, Thala Capsa, Suthul, Calama, Cirta, Castellum de la Mulucha.
- Cities administered by suffets (in the Numidian or Roman era): Altiburos, Calama, Capsa, Cirta, Gadiaufala, Gales, Leptis Magna, Limisa, Mactar, Mascula, Dougga.
- Other cities of the Numidian kingdom: Camarata, Cunugu, Icosium, Lares, Macomades, Madauros, Narragara, Regiae, Russicada, Saldae, Sicca, Simitter, Tabraca, Thaenae Thagura, Timici, Tisidium, Vaga, Zucchabar.

Numidia became highly romanized and was studded with numerous towns. The chief towns of Roman Numidia were, in the north, Cirta or modern Constantine, the capital, with its port Russicada (modern Skikda); and Hippo Regius (near Bône), well known as the see of St. Augustine. To the south in the interior military roads led to Theveste and Lambaesis (Lambessa) with extensive Roman remains, connected by military roads with Cirta and Hippo, respectively.

Lambaesis was the seat of the Legio III Augusta, and the most important strategic centre. It commanded the passes of the Aurès Mountains (Mons Aurasius), a mountain block that separated Numidia from the Gaetuli Berber tribes of the desert, and which was gradually occupied in its whole extent by the Romans under the Empire. Including these towns, there were altogether twenty that are known to have received at one time or another the title and status of Roman colonies; and in the 5th century, the Notitia Dignitatum enumerates no fewer than 123 sees whose bishops assembled at Carthage in 479.

== Episcopal sees ==
See Numidia (Roman province)#Episcopal sees.

== See also ==
- List of kings of Numidia
- Roman Libya
- Shawiya language

== Bibliography ==
- Braund, David (1984). Rome and the Friendly King: The Character of the Client Kingship. Fyshwick: Croom Helm. ISBN 978-0-7099-3216-1.
- Brett, Michael; Fentress, Elisabeth (1996). The Berbers. Blackwell Publishers. ISBN 0-631-20767-8.
- Daho, Keltoum Kitouni; Filah, Mohamed El Mostéfa (2003). L'Algérie au temps des royaumes numides ["Algeria at the time of the Numidian kingdoms"] (in French). Somogy Editions d'Art. ISBN 2-85056-652-7.
- Decret, François; Fanṭar, Muḥammad (1981). L'Afrique du Nord dans l'antiquité: histoire et civilisation, des origines au Ve siècle [North Africa in Antiquity: History and Civilization, from the Origins to the 5th Century] (in French). Paris: Payot. ISBN 978-2-228-12900-8.
- Fage, J.D. (1975). The Cambridge history of Africa. From 500 B.C. to 1050 A.D. Vol. 2nd. Cambridge: Cambridge University Press. ISBN 978-1-139-05456-0.
- Fields, Nic (2025). The Jugurthine War 112–106 BC: Rome's Long War in North Africa. London: Bloomsbury Publishing. ISBN 978-1-4728-6548-9.
- Garrot, Henri (1910). Histoire générale de l'Algérie [General History of Algeria] (in French). Paris: Impr. P. Crescenzo.
- Haresh, Mohamed El Hadi (2013). محمد الهادي حارش - مملكة نوميديا دراسة حضارية منذ أواخرالقرن التاسع إلى منتصف القرن الأول قبل الميلاد [The Kingdom of Numidia: A Civilizational Study from the Late 9th Century to the Mid-1st Century BC] (in Arabic). Algiers: Houma Publishing, Printing, and Distribution House. ISBN 978-9961-65-825-3.
- Horsted, William (2021). The Numidians 300 BC–AD 300. Bloomsbury USA. ISBN 978-1-4728-4219-0.
- Hitchner, R.Bruce (2022). A Companion to North Africa in Antiquity. Medford MA: John Wiley & Sons, Incorporated. ISBN 978-1-119-07175-4.
- Horn, Heinz Günter; Rüger, Christoph B. (1979). Die Numider. Reiter und Könige nördlich der Sahara ["The Numidians. Horsemen and kings north of the Sahara"] (in German). Rheinland. ISBN 3-7927-0498-6.
- Hoyos, B. Dexter (2015). Mastering the West: Rome and Carthage at War. Oxford: Oxford University Press. ISBN 978-0-19-986010-4.
- Julien, Charles-André (1983). كتاب تاريخ إفريقيا الشمالية - لـ شارل أندري جوليان، جزأين [History of North Africa - by Charles-André Julien, two parts] (in Arabic). Translated by Mazali, Mohamed; Ben salama, Al-Bachir (4th ed.). Tunis: Tunisian Publishing House.
- Mhentel, Djahida (2014). "A look on Numidian economy and trade" (PDF). The Arab council of the General Union of Arab Archaeologists. Vol. 15, no. 1. pp. 8–22.
- Kaddache, Mahfoud (2003). L'Algérie des Algériens de la préhistoire à 1954 [Algeria of the Algerians: Prehistory to 1954] (in French). Paris: Paris-Méditerranée. ISBN 978-2-84272-166-4. OCLC 52106453.
- Kuttner, Ann (2013). "Representing Hellenistic Numidia, in Africa and at Rome". In Jonathan R. W. Prag, Josephine Crawley Quinn (ed.). The Hellenistic West. Rethinking the Ancient Mediterranean. Cambridge University. pp. 216–272. ISBN 978-1-107-03242-2.
- Meynier, Gilbert (2007). L'Algérie des origines: de la préhistoire à l'avènement de l'islam [Algeria's Origins: From Prehistory to the Advent of Islam] (in French). Algiers: Barzakh. ISBN 978-2-7071-5088-2.
- Crook, J.A.; Lintott, Andrew; Rawson, Elizabeth (1998). The Cambridge Ancient History: The Last Age of the Roman Republic, 146-43 B.C. Vol. 8 (2nd ed.). Cambridge: Cambridge University Press. ISBN 0-521-23448-4.
- Mirza, Umair (1998). The Cambridge Ancient History. Vol. 9 (2nd ed.). Cambridge: Cambridge University Press. ISBN 0-521-25603-8.
- Pierre, Michel (2023). Histoire de l'Algérie: Des origines à nos jours [History of Algeria: From the origins to the present day] (in French). Paris: Tallandier. ISBN 979-10-210-6453-9.
- Quinn, Josephine Crawley (2013). "Monumental power: 'Numidian Royal Architecture' in context". In Jonathan R. W. Prag, Josephine Crawley Quinn (ed.). The Hellenistic West. Rethinking the Ancient Mediterranean (PDF). Cambridge University. pp. 179–215. ISBN 978-1-107-03242-2.
- Sampson, Gareth C.; Cornell, Tim (2010). The Crisis of Rome: The Jugurthine and Northern Wars and the Rise of Marius. Casemate Publishers. ISBN 978-1-84884-695-1.
