= 151 BC =

151 BC in various calendars
Gregorian calendar	151 BC; CLI BC
Ab urbe condita	603
Ancient Egypt era	XXXIII dynasty, 173
Pharaoh	Ptolemy VI Philometor, 30
Ancient Greek Olympiad (summer)	157th Olympiad, year 2
Assyrian calendar	4600
Balinese saka calendar	N/A
Bengali calendar	−744 – −743
Berber calendar	800
Buddhist calendar	394
Burmese calendar	−788
Byzantine calendar	5358–5359
Chinese calendar	己丑年 (Earth Ox); 2547 or 2340 — to — 庚寅年 (Metal Tiger); 2548 or 2341
Coptic calendar	−434 – −433
Discordian calendar	1016
Ethiopian calendar	−158 – −157
Hebrew calendar	3610–3611
- Hindu calendars
Vikram Samvat	−94 – −93
Shaka Samvat	N/A
Kali Yuga	2950–2951
Holocene calendar	9850
Iranian calendar	772 BP – 771 BP
Islamic calendar	796 BH – 795 BH
Javanese calendar	N/A
Julian calendar	N/A
Korean calendar	2183
Minguo calendar	2062 before ROC 民前2062年
Nanakshahi calendar	−1618
Seleucid era	161/162 AG
Thai solar calendar	392–393
Tibetan calendar	阴土牛年 (female Earth-Ox) −24 or −405 or −1177 — to — 阳金虎年 (male Iron-Tiger) −23 or −404 or −1176

Year 151 BC was a year of the pre-Julian Roman calendar. At the time it was known as the Year of the Consulship of Lucullus and Albinus (or, less frequently, year 603 Ab urbe condita). The denomination 151 BC for this year has been used since the early medieval period, when the Anno Domini calendar era became the prevalent method in Europe for naming years.

== Events ==
=== By place ===
==== Carthage ====
- The Carthaginian debt to Rome is fully repaid, meaning that, according to Carthage, the treaty with Rome, which was put in place at the end of the Second Punic War, is no longer in force. The Romans do not agree with this interpretation. Instead they view the treaty as a permanent declaration of Carthaginian subordination to Rome.
- Numidia launches another border raid on Carthaginian soil, besieging a town. In response Carthage launches a large military expedition (25,000 soldiers) to repel the Numidian invaders.

==== Roman Republic ====
- At Polybius' request, Scipio Aemilianus manages to gain the support of the Roman statesman Cato the Elder (whose son has married Scipio's sister Aemilia) for a proposal to release (and return to Greece) the 300 Achaean internees who are still being held without trial after being deported to Rome in 167 BC.
- Roman forces help the thriving Greek commercial port of Massilia combat raids from the Celts from Cisalpine Gaul.
- Roman armies under the leadership of praetor Servius Sulpicius Galba and the proconsul Lucius Licinius Lucullus arrive in Hispania Ulterior and begin the process of subduing the local population. The revolt of the Celtiberians of Numantia is stopped.

==== India ====
- Agnimitra succeeds his father Pushyamitra Shunga as emperor of the Shunga dynasty.

== Deaths ==
- Pushyamitra Shunga, Indian emperor and founder of the Indian Shunga dynasty, who has reigned since 185 BC
