= NH 151 =

NH 151 may refer to:

- National Highway 151 (India)
- New Hampshire Route 151, United States
