= 151 Wing =

151 Wing may refer to:

- No. 151 Wing RAF, a British air unit active during World War II
- 151st Air Refueling Wing of the United States Air Force
