= Numancia =

Numancia may refer to:

Places

- Numancia, Spanish spelling of the ancient Celtiberian city of Numantia, near modern Soria, Spain
- Numancia de la Sagra, a town in Toledo, Spain
- Numancia (Madrid), a ward of Madrid, Spain
- Numancia, Aklan, a town in the Philippines
- The former name of Del Carmen, Surigao del Norte, another town in the Philippines

Ships

- Spanish ship Numancia, various ships of the Spanish Navy

Other

- CD Numancia, a professional football club in Spain

== See also ==
- Siege of Numantia (134–33 BC), Roman siege of the Celtiberian city
- The Siege of Numantia (c.1582), play by Cervantes about the siege
