= Quintus Fabius Maximus Aemilianus =

Roman statesman and consul

Quintus Fabius Maximus Aemilianus was a Roman statesman and consul (145 BC).

Fabius was by adoption a member of the patrician gens Fabia, but by birth he was the eldest son of Lucius Aemilius Paullus Macedonicus and Papiria Masonis and the elder brother of Scipio Aemilianus. He was the father of Quintus Fabius Maximus Allobrogicus.

Fabius served under his biological father in the Third Macedonian War. After the Battle of Pydna his father sent him to Rome to announce his victory. Fabius served as praetor in Sicily in 149 BC to 148 BC and was elected consul for 145 BC. After his consulship he went as proconsul to Hispania where he fought and defeated Viriathus in an episode of the Lusitanian War but failed to capture him. The war went on until his brother, Scipio Aemilianus, took Numantia a decade later.

Fabius and his brother were the pupils and patrons of the historian Polybius, who recorded the strong fraternal bond between the brothers, even after their adoption into other houses.

Political offices
Preceded by Gnaeus Cornelius Lentulus and Lucius Mummius Achaicus	Consul of the Roman Republic with Lucius Hostilius Mancinus; 145 BC	Succeeded by Servius Sulpicius Galba and Lucius Aurelius Cotta
