= Azaña =

Azaña may refer to:

== People ==
- Jeremías Azaña (born 2000), Argentinian squash player
- Manuel Azaña (1880–1940), Spanish politician
- Mariano Azaña (1896–1965), Spanish film actor

== Places ==
- Azaña or Numancia de la Sagra, Spain
