= Quintus Aelius Tubero =

Quintus Aelius Tubero may refer to:

- Quintus Aelius Tubero (Stoic) (fl. 2nd century BC), Roman Stoic philosopher
- Quintus Aelius Tubero (historian) (fl. mid-1st century BC), Roman jurist and historian
- Quintus Aelius Tubero (consul), Roman consul in 11 BC; son of the historian
