= Scipionic Circle =

Group of philosophers, poets and politicians patronized by Scipio Aemilianus

The Scipionic Circle, or the Circle of Scipio, was a group of philosophers, poets, and politicians patronized by their namesake, Scipio Aemilianus. Together they would discuss Greek culture, literature, and humanism. Alongside their philhellenic disposition, the group also had a more humane Roman foreign policy. The term was first derived during the 19th century and ubiquitously adopted by scholars of the early 20th century. The collection of members varied during its existence, from 15 names of the early period, to 27 in its middle to 10 in its final.

Contemporary academia regards the concept of the "Scipionic Circle" with suspicion. Cicero is the primary source on the subject, in his works De amicitia and De republica. Cicero's construction claims an (otherwise unsupported) unity of opinion among Scipio's friends. If there ever had been such a unity it would have been between Panaetius and the more philosophically-inclined members of the collective. In addition to a dependence on these works of Cicero, within these two works Cicero creates two different circles. Among other problems brought up by academics, two of the most prominent members of the group, Terence and Panaetius, could never have met, as Terence had died prior to Panaetius' arrival in Rome.

== In De re publica ==
Main speakers:

- Scipio Aemilianus, consul of Rome in 147 BC and 134 BC.
- Gaius Laelius Sapiens, consul of Rome in 140 BC.

Senior speakers:

- Lucius Furius Philus, consul of Rome in 136 BC.
- Manius Manilius, consul of Rome in 149 BC.
- Spurius Mummius, satirist and soldier.

Younger speakers:

- Quintus Aelius Tubero, tribunate in 130 BC.
- Publius Rutilius Rufus, consul of Rome in 105 BC; fought alongside Scipio during the Numantine War.
- Quintus Mucius Scaevola Augur, consul of Rome in 117 BC.
- Gaius Fannius, consul of Rome in 122 BC.

Having younger speakers illustrates "the Roman penchant for training the youth by having them listen to respected members of the previous generation, as in De oratore."

== In De oratore ==
This dialogue takes place in 91 BC.

Senior Speakers:

- Quintus Mucius Scaevola Augur, who "provides an important link between the two dialogues, a young man in De re publica and an old man, the father-in-law and teacher of Crassus, in De oratore."

== Other members ==
- Terence, Carthaginian-born playwright
- Gaius Lucilius, the earliest Roman satirist
- Polybius, a Greek historian
- Panaetius of Rhodes, the seventh and final Stoic scholarch
