= The Siege of Numantia =

Theater Play by Miguel de Cervantes

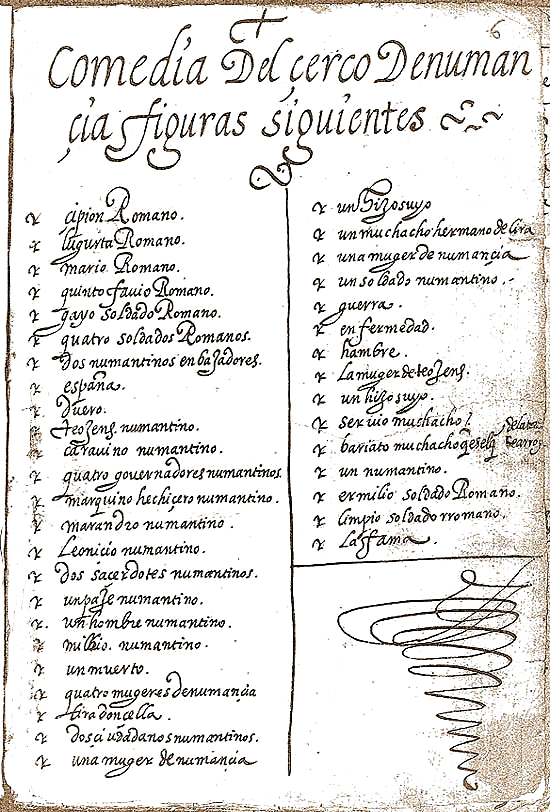
- The Siege of Numantia
- Original language: Spanish
- Written by: Miguel de Cervantes
- Characters: Romans: Scipio, Jugurtha, Caius Marius, Quintus Fabius; Numantines: Theogenes, Caravino, Marquino, Marandro, Leonicio, Lira; Allegories: Spain, the Duero River and three tributaries, War, Pestilence, Hunger, Fame
- Subject: the fall of the Spanish city of Numantia to the Romans
- Genre: historical tragedy
- Setting: Numantia, 133 BCE

The Siege of Numantia (Spanish: El cerco de Numancia) is a tragedy by Miguel de Cervantes set at the siege of Numantia, captured and razed by Scipio Aemilianus in 133 BC.

The play is divided into four acts, (jornadas, or "days"). The dialogue is sometimes in tercets and sometimes in redondillas, but for the most part in octaves. The work was composed circa 1582 and was apparently very successful in the years before the advent of the playwright Lope de Vega. It remained unpublished until the eighteenth-century. Since then, it has been hailed by many as a “rare specimen of Spanish tragedy” and even as the best Spanish tragedy not only from the period before Lope de Vega, but of all its literature.

Some critics have seen resemblances between Cervantes' tragedy and Aeschylus's The Persians, while others reject that the play is a conventional tragedy. Some envision the play as containing epic elements or even exhibiting opposing epics: Virgil's Aeneid and Lucan's Pharsalia, while Barbara Simerka argues for generic instability and the counter-epic.

== Plot ==
In the first act, Scipio appears with his generals in the Roman camp before Numantia. He explains that this war has been going on for many years and that the Roman Senate has sent him to finish the task. He reprimands his troops, whose martial spirit has begun to be superseded by the pleasures of Venus and Bacchus. The soldiers are re-inspired with courage. Numantian ambassadors enter with proposals for peace, which are rejected. The Greek Chorus, in Cervantes' work is replaced by allegorical figures.

Spain appears, and she summons the river Duero, on whose banks Numantia stands. The old river god appears, attended by a retinue of the deities of the smaller rivers of the surrounding country. These allegorical characters consult fate, in the guise of Proteus and discover that Numantia cannot be saved. The lengthy speech dealing with Spanish history has been taken as a moment of praise for the future Spanish empire, and as containing elements that question imperial expansionism.

In Act Two, the scene is now transferred to Numantia. The senate is assembled to deliberate on the affairs of the city. The senate adopts bold resolutions. The story moves into light redondillas - the loves of a young Numantian, named Marandro for Lira. Although Venus is invoked, Marandro assures his friend Leoncio that true love (as opposed to Roman lust) does not impede his duties as citizen and soldier. A solemn sacrifice is prepared; but amidst the ceremony an evil spirit appears, seizes the sacrificial ram, and extinguishes the fire. The confusion in the town increases. A dead man is resuscitated by magic in a dramatic scene reminiscent of the necromantic revivification by the witch Erichto in the Pharsalia.

In the third act, all hope for a successful resolution of the dispute between Romans and Numantians has now vanished. While the men would go out and fight the Romans in the field rather than die of hunger in the siege, the women of the play prevent them from doing this. It is they who recommend a mass suicide, for, in this manner, they will not become enslaved to the Romans. It is the women, then, who impel Theagenes to carry out this fatal action, thus playing a key role in the tragic denouement.

The city resolves to burn all their valuable property, to put their wives and children to death, and to throw themselves into the flames, lest any of the inhabitants of the town should become the slaves of the Romans. Scenes of domestic misery and of patriotism ensue. Famine rages in Numantia. Marandro, accompanied by his friend, Leoncio, ventures to enter the Roman camp.

The tragic denouement ensues in Act Four. Here, Marandro returns with some bread smeared with blood in order to feed Lira, but he falls at her feet mortally wounded, foregrounding the theme of sacrifice. Scenes of destruction and mass suicide ensue, as men kill their women and then turn the sword on themselves or duel with each other. The allegorical figures of War, Sickness and Hunger take over the stage in an apocalyptic ambiance.

When Bariato, the last youth left alive, commits suicide by throwing himself from a tower, the Roman general realizes that he cannot go home with slaves and spoil, and that the small city of Numantia has triumphed over the power of the Romans. His lament signals for some critics the final catastrophe and his role as tragic hero. His hubris and desire for domination rather than negotiation has brought him to his knees. The allegorical figure of Fame enters at the end of the piece, and announces the future glory of Spain, a great power that will rise out of the ashes of Numantia like the phoenix.
