= Spurius Mummius =

Spurius Mummius was a Roman soldier and writer.

He was a legatus of his brother Lucius Mummius in Corinth in 146 BC and 145 BC and a close friend of Scipio Aemilianus. This friendship garnered his entrance into the Scipionic Circle. Politically, he was an aristocrat. He wrote satirical and ethical epistles, describing his experiences in Corinth in humorous verse. According to the Encyclopædia Britannica, these letters, which were still popular a hundred years later, were the first examples of a distinct class of Roman poetry, the poetic epistle.
