= Garray =

- Municipality
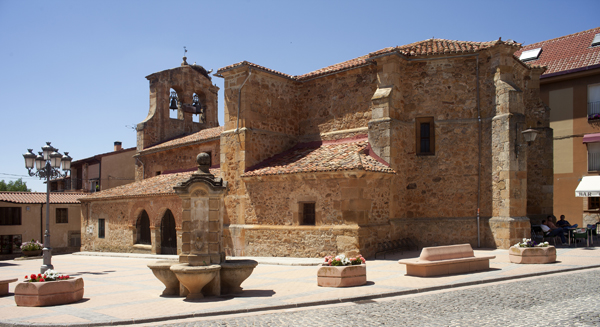

- Flag Coat of arms

- Garray within the province of Soria

- Location in Spain. Garray (Spain)
- Coordinates: 41°48′52″N 2°26′52″W
- Country: Spain
- Autonomous community: Castile and León
- Province: Soria
- Municipality: Garray

Government
  - Mayoress: María José Jiménez Las Heras

Area
  - Total: 76.24 km^{2} (29.44 sq mi)
- Elevation: 1.011 m (3.32 ft)

Population (2025-01-01)
  - Total: 794
- Time zone: UTC+1 (CET)
  - Summer (DST): UTC+2 (CEST)
- Website: Official website

Garray is a municipality located in the province of Soria, Castile and León, Spain.

== History ==
The archaeological site of Numantia is within the boundaries of Garray. It is famous for its role in the Celtiberian Wars.

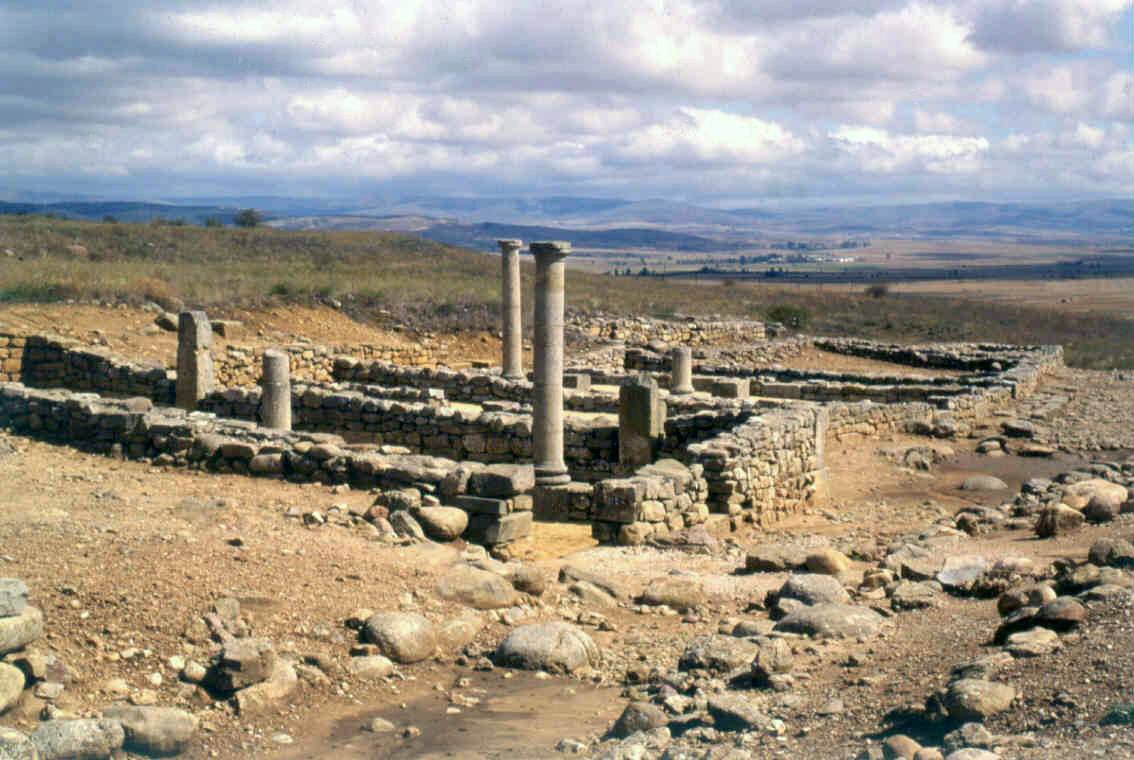
