= Gnaeus Cornelius Lentulus (consul 146 BC) =

Gnaeus Cornelius Lentulus was a consul of the Roman Republic in 146 BC. His colleague was Lucius Mummius Achaicus, whose military achievements outshone him.

He was from the Lentuli branch of the gens Cornelia. He had held the office of praetor by 149 BC.

In 161, Cornelius Lentulus was sent as an ambassador with Publius Apustius to Cyrene for the purpose of informing Ptolemy VII of Rome's decision to end its alliance with Ptolemy VI.

== Children ==
His son, who had the same name, was consul in 97 BC.

Political offices
Preceded by Publius Cornelius Scipio Aemilianus Africanus and Gaius Livius Drusus	Consul of the Roman Republic with Lucius Mummius Achaicus; 146 BC	Succeeded by Quintus Fabius Maximus Aemilianus and Lucius Hostilius Mancinus
