= Numantia =

Ancient Celtiberian settlement

- Numancia
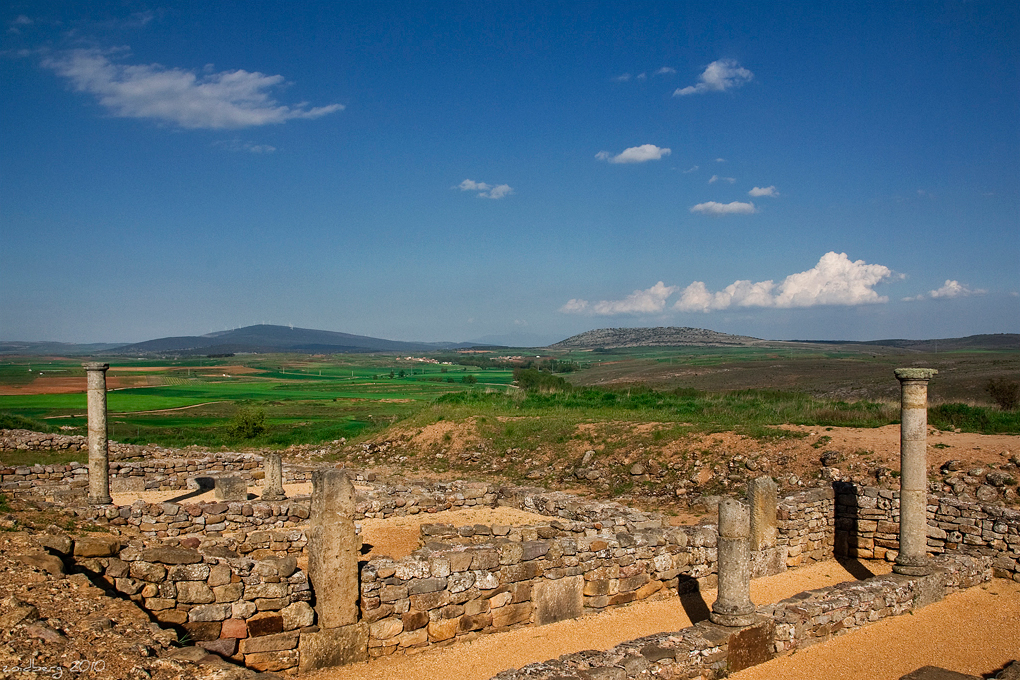

- Location of the site in Spain
- 41°48′34.51″N 2°26′39.33″W
- Type: Archaeological site
- Cultures: Celtiberian
- Location: Garray (Soria), Spain

Spanish Cultural Heritage
- Type: Non-movable
- Criteria: Archaeological site
- Designated: 25 August 1882
- Reference no.: RI-55-0000001

Numantia (in Spanish: Numancia [nuˈman.θja]) is an ancient Celtiberian settlement, whose remains are located on a hill known as Cerro de la Muela in the current municipality of Garray (Soria), Spain.

Numantia is famous for its role in the Celtiberian Wars. In 153 BC, Numantia experienced its first serious conflict with Rome. After twenty years of hostilities, in 133 BC the Roman Senate gave Scipio Aemilianus Africanus the task of destroying Numantia.

== History ==
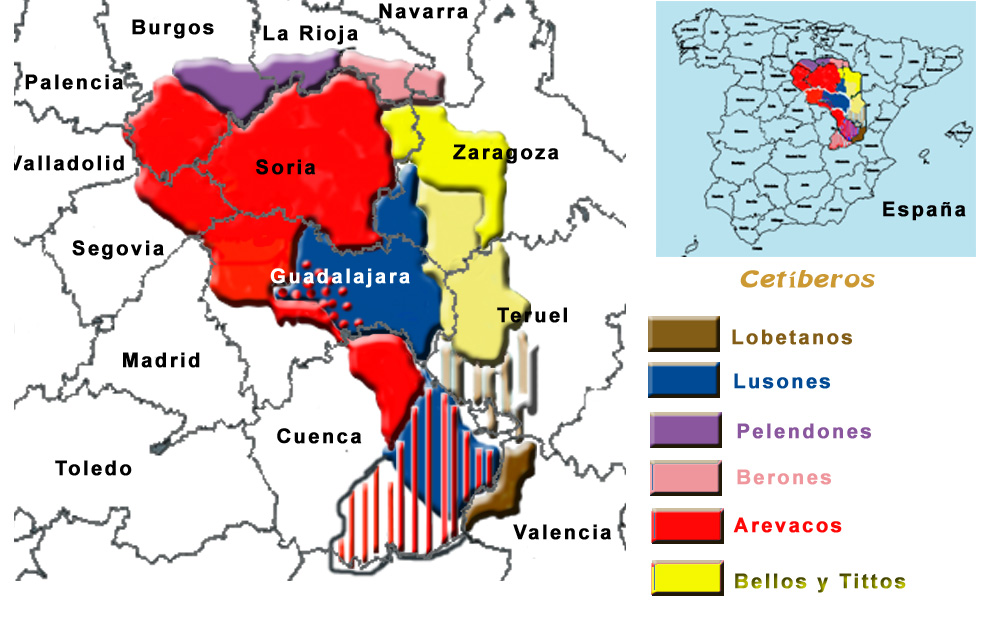
Territory of the Celtiberi tribe with the probable locations of its sub-groups

Numantia was an Iron Age hill fort (in Roman terminology an oppidum), which controlled a crossing of the river Duero. Pliny the Elder counts it as a city of the Pellendones, but other authors, like Strabo and Ptolemy place it among the Arevaci people. The Arevaci were a Celtiberian tribe, formed by the mingling of Iberians and migrating Celts in the 6th century BC, who inhabited an area near Numantia and Uxama.

The first serious conflict with Rome occurred in 153 BC when Quintus Fulvius Nobilior was consul. Numantia took in some fugitives from the city of Segeda, who belonged to another Celtiberian tribe called the Belli. The leader of the Belli, Carus of Segeda, managed to defeat a Roman army. The Romans then besieged Numantia, and deployed a small number of war elephants, but were unsuccessful.

In 137 BC, 20,000 Romans surrendered to the Celtiberians of Numantia (population between 4,000 and 8,000). The young Roman officer Tiberius Gracchus, as quaestor, saved the Roman army from destruction by signing a peace treaty with the Numantines, an action generally reserved for a legate.

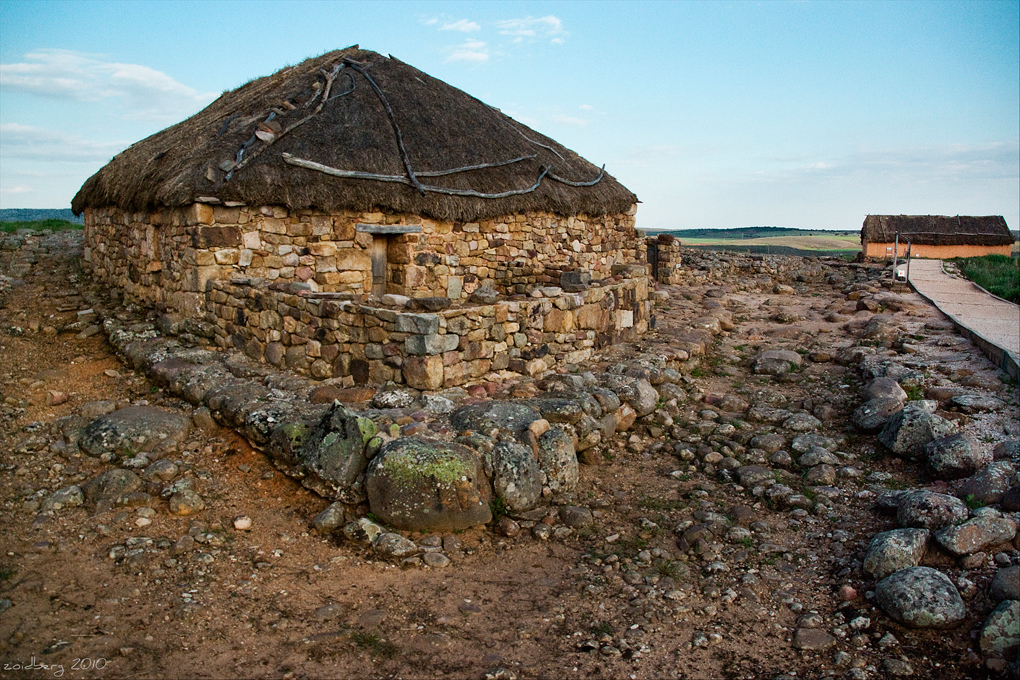
Modern reconstruction of the Celtiberian houses in Numantia

The final siege of Numantia began in 134 BC. Scipio Aemilianus in command of an army of 30,000 soldiers laid siege to the city, erecting a 9 km barrier supported by towers, moats, impaling rods, and other devices. The Numantians refused to surrender and famine quickly spread through the city. After eight months most of the inhabitants decided to commit suicide rather than become slaves. A few hundred of the inhabitants decided to burn the city before surrendering after 13 months of siege.

=== Later history ===
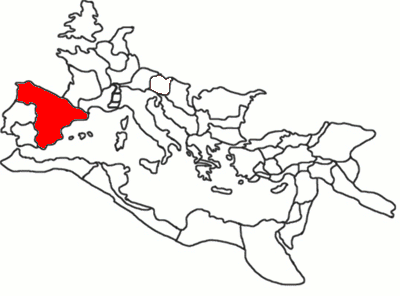
Numantia was incorporated into the Roman Imperial province of Hispania Tarraconensis (pictured in red), AD 120.

After the destruction in 133 BC, occupation continued in the 1st century BC with a regular street plan but without great public buildings. Its decay started in the 3rd century, but was still settled in the 4th century.

Later remains from the 6th century hint of a Visigoth occupation.

== Excavation and conservation of Numantia ==
Numantia's exact location vanished from memory, and some theories placed it in Zamora, but in 1860 Eduardo Saavedra identified the correct location in Garray, Soria. In 1882, the ruins of Numantia were declared a national monument. In 1905, the German archaeologist Adolf Schulten began a series of excavations which located the Roman camps around the city. In 1999, the Roman camps were included in a zona arqueológica, a category of the Spanish heritage register which did not exist when the hillfort was first protected. Regular excavations are still ongoing.

=== Museums ===
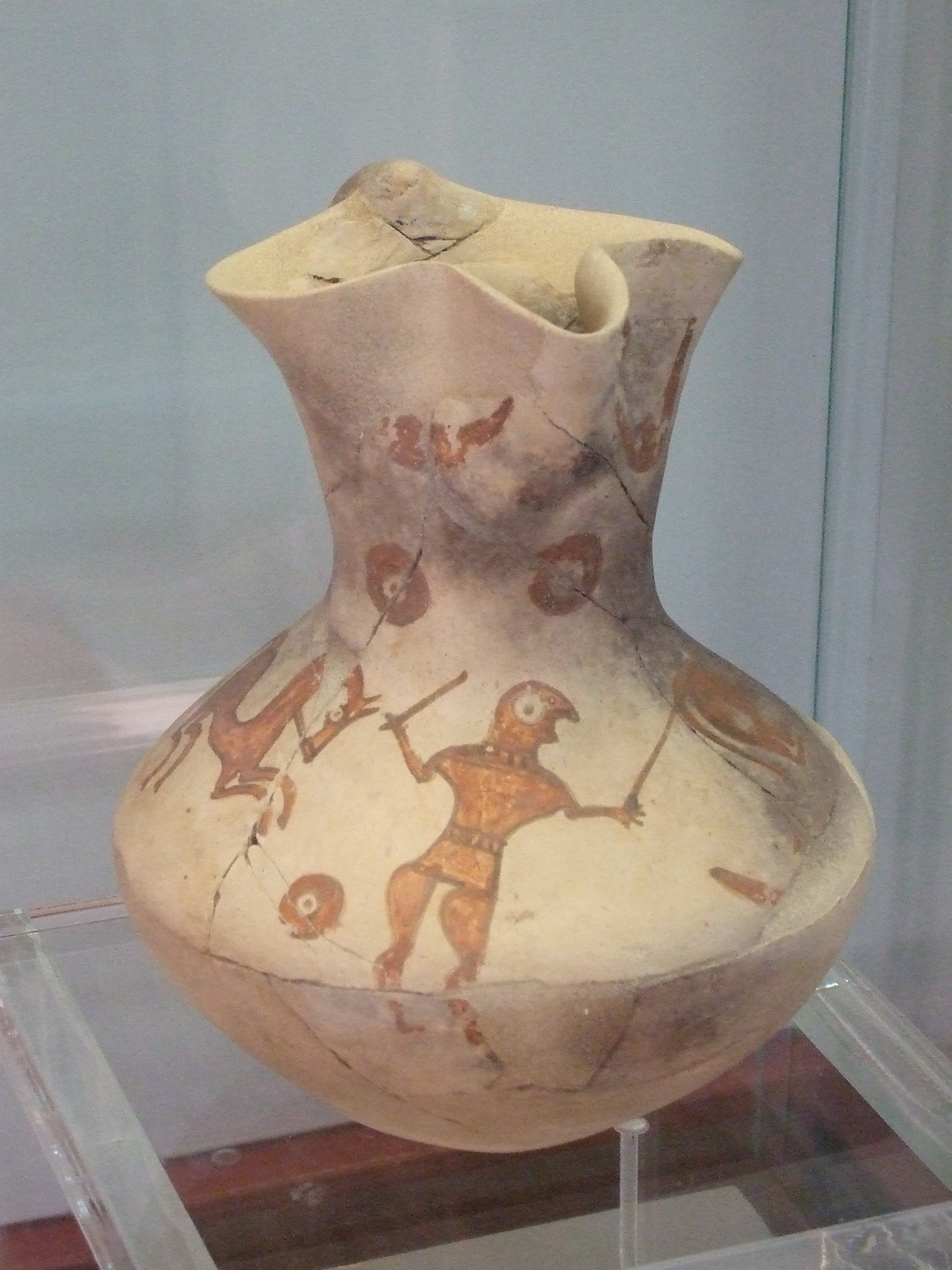
Jar with three spouts (1st century B.C.) in the Museo Numantino

Many objects from the site are on display in the Numantine Museum of Soria (Spanish: Museo Numantino). This museum is also responsible for in situ displays at Numantia.

Other collections which have items from the site include the Romano-Germanic Central Museum, Mainz. (Some objects were taken by Adolf Schulten to Germany).

== Symbolism ==
The Siege of Numantia was recorded by several Roman historians who admired the sense of freedom of the ancient Iberians and acknowledged their fighting skills against the Roman legions.

=== In Spanish culture ===
Miguel de Cervantes (author of Don Quijote) wrote a play about the siege, El cerco de Numancia, which stands today as his best-known full-length dramatic work. Antonio Machado references the city in his poetry book Campos de Castilla. The poem is an ode to the countryside and peoples of rural Castile. More recently, Carlos Fuentes wrote a short story about the event, "The Two Numantias", in his collection The Orange Tree.

Several Spanish Navy ships have been named Numancia and a Sorian battalion was named batallón de numantinos. During the Spanish Civil War, the Nationalist Numancia regiment took the town of Azaña in Toledo. To erase the memory of the Republican president Manuel Azaña, they renamed it Numancia de la Sagra.

The Sorian football team is called CD Numancia.

The expression "numantine resistance" is occasionally used to refer to particularly obdurate resistance.

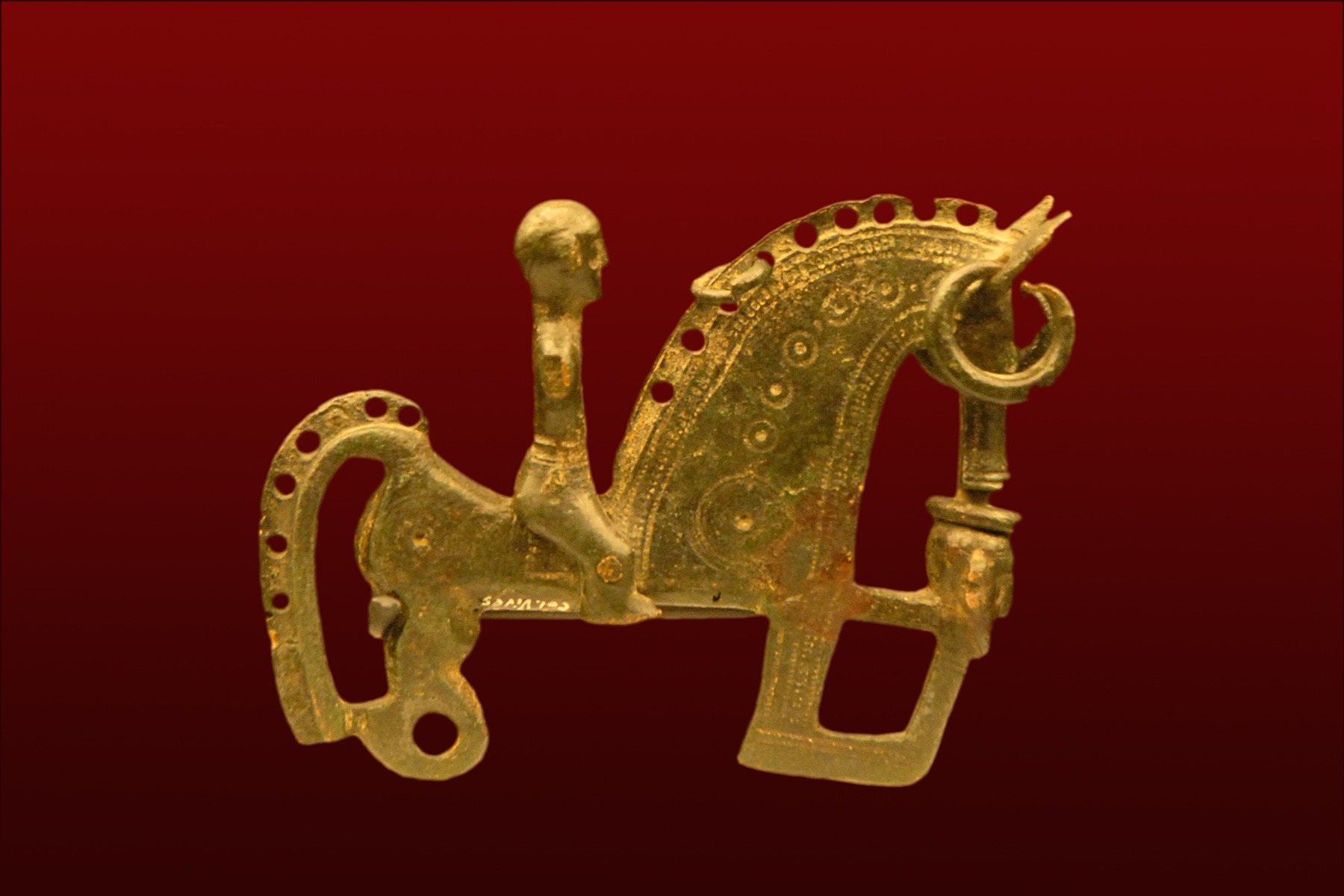
A bronze Celtiberian fibula, from which the horse of Numancia comes.

The Horse of Numantia (in Spanish: Caballo de Numancia or Caballito de Soria) is an emblem associated with the settlement’s unwavering resilience and is today the most iconic symbol of the province of Soria. For the Numantines, the horse represented Epona, the goddess of horses. It was also a symbol of social status; anyone who rode one was seen as wealthy and prestigious. In the early 1990s, excavations began at the Numantia archaeological site, where this copper fibula was found; it also appeared on other objects such as pots. Nowadays, it is common to see this symbol as a sticker on various cars in Spain.

== Bibliography ==
- Rafael Trevino "Rome's Enemies 4: Spanish Armies 218 BC – 19 BC", Osprey Military, Man-at-arms Series 180, 1992, ISBN 0-85045-701-7
