= Tiberius Claudius Asellus (tribune of the plebs 139 BCE) =

Ancient Roman senator

Tiberius Claudius Asellus was a man of Ancient Rome of the equestrian order. He was deprived of his horse, and reduced to the condition of an Aerarii by Scipio Aemilianus in his censorship in 142 BCE.

When Asellus boasted of his military services, and complained that he had been degraded unjustly, Scipio replied with the Latin proverb, "Agas asellum", that is, "Agas asellum, si bovem non agere queas", which roughly translates to "Drive the donkey if you can't drive the ox"; it was a proverbial expression for saying that if a person cannot hold as good a station as he wishes, he must be content with a lower one.

In 140 BCE, he unsuccessfully attempted to prevent the departure of Quintus Servilius Caepio for the Lusitanian War.

When Asellus was tribune of the plebs in 139 BCE, he accused Scipio before the people; and the writer Aulus Gellius makes a quotation from the fifth oration of Scipio against Asellus, which may have been delivered in this year. Among other charges which Asellus brought against Scipio, was that the lustrum had been inauspicious (because it had been followed by a pestilence); and Gellius has preserved two verses of Gaius Lucilius referring to this charge:

Scipiadae magno improbus objiciebat Asellus
Lustrum, illo censore, malum infelixque fuisse.

Scipio replied that it was not surprising that it should have been so, as his colleague, Lucius Mummius Achaicus, who had performed the lustrum, had removed Asellus from the aerarians and restored him to his former rank.

This Claudius Asellus seems to be the same who was poisoned by his wife, Licinia.
