= Lucius Mummius Achaicus =

Roman praetor (Hispania Ulterior, 153 BC) and consul (Achaia, 146 BC)

- Born: Lucius Mummius c. 193 BC
- Died: c. 140 BC
- Known for: Destruction of Corinth
- Office: Praetor, Hispania Ulterior (153 BC); Proconsul, Hispania Ulterior (152 BC); Consul (146 BC); Proconsul, Achaea (145 BC); Censor (142 BC)
- Military career
- Conflicts: Battle of Ocile; Siege of Corinth
- Awards: Roman triumph

Lucius Mummius (c. 193 BC – c. 140 BC) was a Roman statesman and general. He was consul in the year 146 BC along with Gnaeus Cornelius Lentulus.

Mummius was the first of his family to rise to the rank of consul thereby making him a novus homo. He received the agnomen Achaicus for his victories over the Achaean League destroying the famous ancient city of Corinth, at that time a leading city of the League, as part of his campaign. Mummius' victory over the Achaean League and the sack of Corinth placed Rome firmly in control of all Greece from a political standpoint - something Rome had avoided doing even though their involvement in the Greek East dated back as far as 226 BC when they confronted Illyrian piracy. The destruction of Corinth marked the end of free Greece.

== Career ==
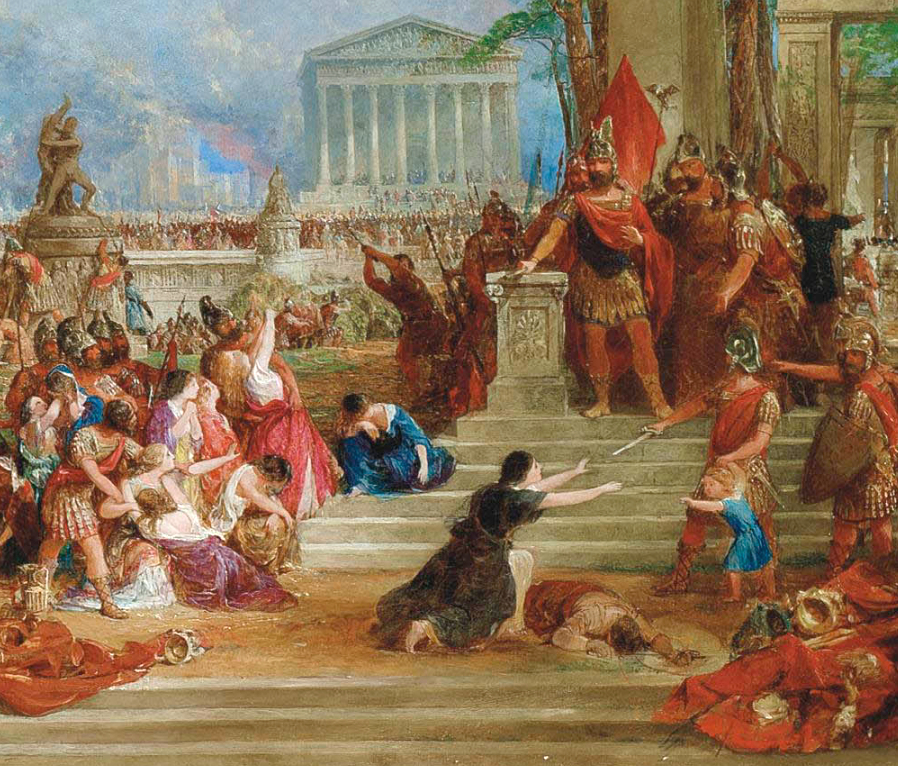
Roman general Lucius Mummius Achaicus leading The Sack of Corinth, by Thomas Allom

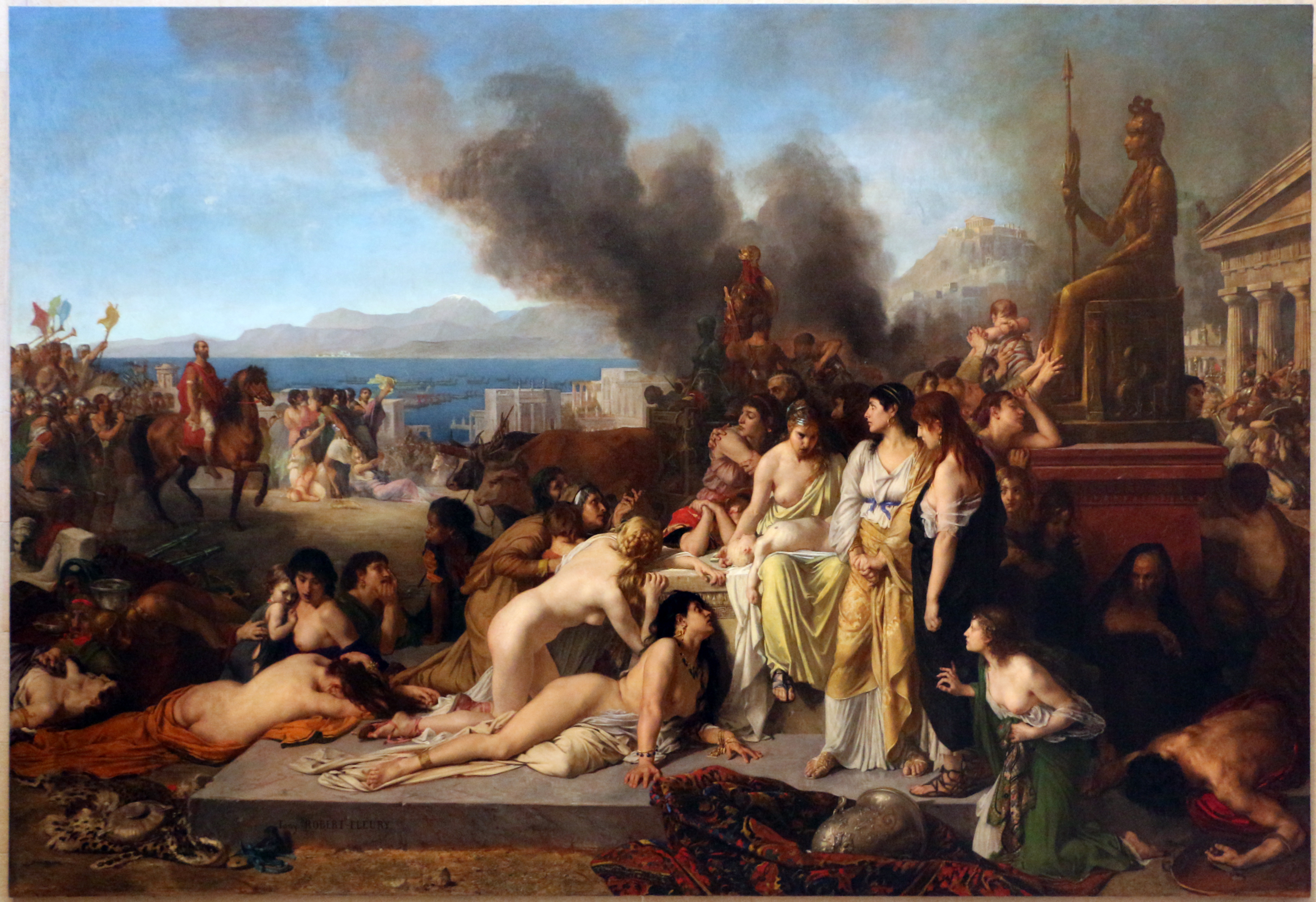
Lucius Mummius Achaicus entering Corinth following the Battle of Corinth (146 BC). The last day on Corinth, Tony Robert-Fleury, 1870

Born Lucius Mummius of a homonymous father, his father was plebeian tribune in 187 BC and praetor in 177 BC. His lack of a consular ancestor made him a homo novus. Almost nothing is known about this Mummius' early career.

=== Praetorship and governorship of Hispania Ulterior ===
He served as praetor in 153 BC and was assigned to Hispania Ulterior, succeeding the praetor Lucius Calpurnius Piso Caesoninus who had been defeated with heavy losses in battle against the Lusitanians. There, he won some successes against the Lusitani and was prorogued pro consule into 152 BC. The conflict with the Lusitanians included a substantial amount of raiding. During Mummius' year in Hispania he destroyed the Lusitanian raiders in his province before embarking his men into Africa where he defeated them again, creating an opening for his successor to push into Lusitania proper.

Mummius returned to Rome in 151 BC, having been replaced in province by praetor Marcus Atilius, and celebrated a triumph. Even though he had triumphed, he was likely repulsed from the consulship one or twice before his success in the comitia of 147, possibly having made a deal with Scipio Aemilianus (at the time deployed in Africa fighting the Third Punic War) not to seek reassignment of Aemilianus' command.

=== Consulship and the Achaean War ===
Elected consul for 146 BC with Gnaeus Cornelius Lentulus as his colleague, Mummius received the command of the Achaean War in succession of Metellus Macedonicus. The war had gone well for Rome even before Mummius took command, with Metellus having defeated the Achaeans under Critolaus at Scarpheia in Locris. With Metellus seeking to take credit for the Achaean victory, Mummius dashed to the army camp so he could take command. Arriving as Metellus was poised to assault the Isthmus of Corinth, he ordered him to return to Macedonia and took command of the army in central Greece. Although the Achaeans under Diaeus mobilised all the men they could (even freeing their slaves), they could not hold the isthmus and were routed. Corinth's population quickly fled the city.

Mummius descended upon Corinth and found the city undefended with its gates open. Following senatorial instructions, the Romans sacked the city. The senate dispatched the customary ten-man commission to settle affairs both in Achaea and Macedonia (which had fought the Fourth Macedonian War shortly earlier). Both regions were provincialised and consolidated under the rule of a Roman governor seated in Macedonia; the various Greek leagues were dissolved. The senatorial commission also brought instructions that Corinth be razed; pursuant to them, the city was destroyed. Whatever inhabitants remained in the city were sold into slavery and Corinthian territory was confiscated as Roman ager publicus. Those cities who had taken the Achaeans side were punished; among others, Thebes and Chalcis were forced to demolish their walls.

During his proconsulship and through his triumph, he generously donated the Corinthian booty – possibly to further his ambitions for the censorship and certainly to win good relations with Greek cities – giving at least seventeen different communities statues and art taken from Corinth. Among the recipients especially were Greek cities he stopped in during his proconsulship, some of which erected inscriptions commemorating his visit and the defeat of the Achaeans. Votives were also given at Delphi and Olympia. Staying in Achaea through 145 BC pro consule, he was awarded a second triumph on his return to Rome, this time over the Achaeans and the Corinthians. The bounty brought across the pomerium was enormous and he was allegedly the first to have Greek theatre performed at Rome: indeed, centuries later the authors Tacitus and Pliny attributed the start of serious philhellenism at Rome to Mummius' triumph. He also received the victory agnomen Achaicus, the first novus homo to receive one.

=== Censorship ===
Elected to the censorship of 142 BC with Scipio Aemilianus as his colleague, Mummius spent lavishly from the proceeds of his Achaean campaign. A temple to Hercules, vowed for the victory, he also constructed from the proceeds; Mummius' temple was dedicated in 142 BC and is likely not the one that survives at Rome in the Forum Boarium but was instead located on the Caelian Hill.

Although Scipio was inclined to be strict, Mummius was more lenient and moderated his colleague, preventing him from stripping Tiberius Claudius Asellus of the public horse. The lustrum was completed the next year in 141 BC.

He probably died shortly after his censorship, since by 140 BC amid disputes over his censorship with Aemilianus he is spoken of in the past tense. Such a death would also be consistent with a senatorial decree for his daughter to be provided a dowry, since if he were still alive he would have been able to pay it directly.

== Art ==
His indifference to works of art and ignorance of their value is shown by his well-known remark to those who were contracted for the shipment of the treasures of Corinth to Rome, that "if they lost or damaged them, they would have to replace them." He was, in other words, unaware that a "new-for-old-deal" was inappropriate for such valuable antiques. Mummius plundered Corinth and sent home ship loads of its priceless art and rich furniture to Rome. For the theatrical pageants exhibited by him he erected a theatre with improved acoustical conditions and seats after the Greek model, thus marking a distinct advance in the construction of places of entertainment.

== Family ==
Lucius had a brother, called Spurius Mummius, who is recorded as a legate in the 140s BC. Lucius also had a daughter called Mummia and a son (or possibly grandson) who is only attested by nomen. A great-granddaughter called Mummia Achaica is attested in the middle Augustan period as the wife of Gaius Sulpicius Galba (the consul of 5 BC) and as mother of the emperor Galba.

== See also ==
- Achaean League
- Roman Greece

== Bibliography ==
- Broughton, Thomas Robert Shannon (1951). The magistrates of the Roman republic. Vol. 1. New York: American Philological Association.
- Broughton, Thomas Robert Shannon (1952). The magistrates of the Roman republic. Vol. 2. New York: American Philological Association.
- Broughton, Thomas Robert Shannon (1986). The magistrates of the Roman republic. Vol. 3. Atlanta, GA: Scholars Press.
- This article incorporates text from a publication now in the public domain: Chisholm, Hugh, ed. (1911). "Mummius, Lucius". Encyclopædia Britannica. Vol. 18 (11th ed.). Cambridge University Press. pp. 966–967.
- Derow, P S (1989). "Rome, the fall of Macedon and the sack of Corinth". In Astin, A E; et al. (eds.). Rome and the Mediterranean to 133 BC. Cambridge Ancient History. Vol. 8 (2nd ed.). Cambridge University Press. ISBN 0-521-23448-4. OCLC 916019669.
- Münzer, Fredrich (1933a). "Mummius 7a" . Realencyclopädie der classischen Altertumswissenschaft (in German). Vol. XVI, 1. Stuttgart: Butcher. cols. 1195–1206 – via Wikisource.
- Richardson, Lawrence (1992). A new topographical dictionary of ancient Rome. Baltimore, MD: Johns Hopkins University press. ISBN 978-0-8018-4300-6.
- Rosenstein, Nathan S (2012). Rome and the Mediterranean, 290 to 146 BC: the imperial republic. Edinburgh History of Ancient Rome. Edinburgh University Press. ISBN 978-0-7486-2321-1.
- Sumner, G V (1973). The orators in Cicero's Brutus: prosopography and chronology. Heritage. University of Toronto Press. JSTOR 10.3138/j.ctvcj2j22.
- Yarrow, Liv (2006). "Lucius Mummius and the spoils of Corinth" (PDF). Scripta Classica Israelica. 25: 57–70.
- Zmeskal, Klaus (2009). Adfinitas (in German). Vol. 1. Passau: Verlag Karl Stutz. ISBN 978-3-88849-304-1.

Political offices
Preceded by Scipio Aemilianus; Gaius Livius Drusus	Roman consul 146 BC; With: Gnaeus Cornelius Lentulus	Succeeded by Q. Fabius Maximus Aemilianus; Lucius Hostilius Mancinus
