= Spanish ship Numancia =

Various Spanish Navy ships

Three ships of the Spanish Navy have borne the name Numancia, after the Siege of Numantia of 134–133 BC during the Numantine War:

- Numancia, ex-Russian ship Lübeck, a 74-gun ship of the line purchased from the Imperial Russian Navy in 1818, disarmed in 1820, and sold in 1822.
- Spanish ironclad Numancia, an armoured frigate, a type of broadside ironclad, commissioned in 1864 and stricken in 1912, the first ironclad warship to circumnavigate the world.
- Spanish frigate Numancia, a Santa María-class frigate commissioned in 1989.
