= Quintus Aelius Tubero (Stoic) =

Roman philosopher and politician

Quintus Aelius Tubero was a Stoic philosopher and a pupil of Panaetius of Rhodes. He had a reputation for talent and legal knowledge. He might have been a tribune of the plebs in 130 BC. He also possibly became a suffect consul in 118 BC.

Cicero spoke of his character in parallel to his oratorical style: "harsh, unpolished, and austere". Despite this, Cicero also calls him "a man of the most rigid virtue, and strictly conformable to the doctrine he professed."

He was the grandson of Lucius Aemilius Paullus Macedonicus, Thus, he was both a cousin of Marcus Porcius Cato Licinianus and also the nephew of Scipio Aemilianus. This association, alongside the approval of Panaetius, gave him access to the Scipionic Circle.

When Scipio Aemilianus died mysteriously in 129 BC, Tubero was responsible for the funeral arrangements. With Cynic-like aesthetics, he arranged Punic couches with goatskin covers and Samian pottery. The lack of public grandeur, allegedly, lost him the election for praetorship.

Panaetius wrote an epistle to Tubero concerning the endurance of pain. A disciple of Panaetius (Hecaton of Rhodes) dedicated a treatise called De Officiis to Tubero.

== Bibliography ==
Modern sources

- T. Robert S. Broughton, The Magistrates of the Roman Republic, American Philological Association, 1952–1960.
