= Siege of Numantia =

Siege of a Celtiberian city by the Roman Republic

Coordinates: 41.8096°N 2.4443°W

- Part of the Numantine War
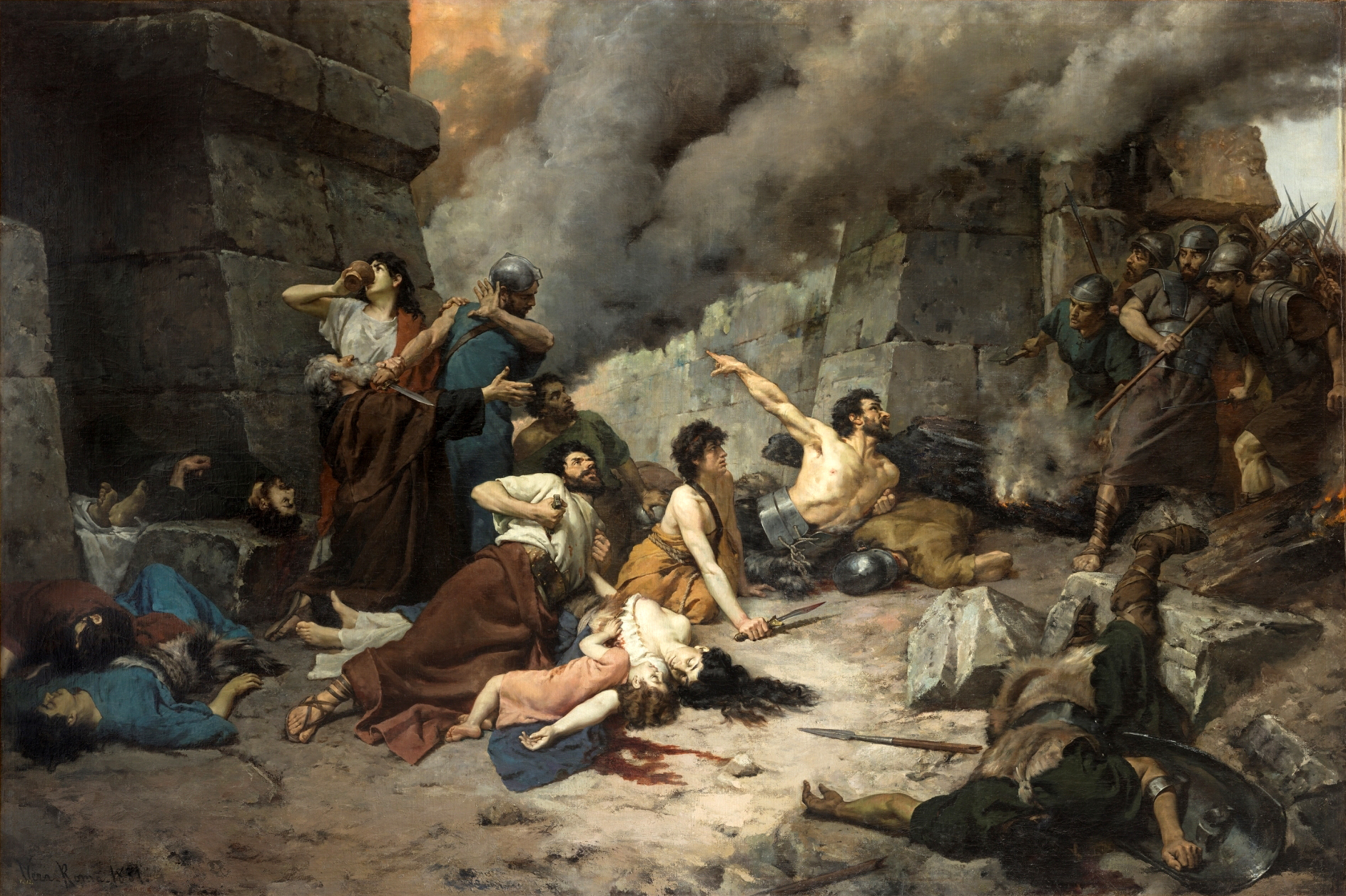
- Numancia, Alejo Vera y Estaca, 1881
Date	134 – 133 BC, lasting either eight or sixteen months
Location	Numantia, Iberia
Result	Roman victory with destruction of the city

Belligerents
Roman Republic; Kingdom of Numidia	Celtiberians

Commanders and leaders
Scipio Aemilianus; Jugurtha	Avarus †

Strength
20,000 legionaries 40,000 allies and mercenaries 12 war elephants.	4,000 militia

Casualties and losses
Unknown	All defenders killed by their own hand Whole city destroyed

The Celtiberian oppidum of Numantia was attacked more than once by Roman forces, but the siege of Numantia refers to the culminating and pacifying action of the long-running Numantine War between the forces of the Roman Republic and those of the native population of Hispania Citerior. The Numantine War was the third of the Celtiberian Wars and it broke out in 143 BC. A decade later, in 133 BC, the Roman general and hero of the Third Punic War, Scipio Aemilianus Africanus, subjugated Numantia, the chief Celtiberian city.

== Roman preparation ==
In late 135 BC, the Roman Senate reappointed Scipio consul on popular demand and sent him to Hispania to finish what lesser generals had failed to complete. Scipio found morale low among the troops stationed in Iberia. The chance of plunder being low, there were few enticements to enlistment. Scipio nevertheless raised an army of 20,000 with 40,000 allied and mercenary troops, especially Numidian cavalry and 12 elephants led by Jugurtha. The troops were trained hard by constant marching and there were several successful skirmishes before Scipio began to surround the city of Numantia itself. He planned only to starve it out and not to storm it.

== Siege works ==
Scipio's army constructed two camps separated by a wall around the city (circumvallation). He dammed the nearby swamp to create a lake between the city walls and his own. From ten feet off the ground, his archers could shoot into Numantia from seven towers interspersed along the wall. He also built an outer wall to protect his camps (eventually five in total) from any relief forces (contravallation).

Scipio also engineered the isolation of the city from the Duero. He towered the river at the points where it entered and exited the city and strung a cable across, with blades, to prevent both boats and swimmers from leaving or entering the city.

== Counterattack ==
The Numantines attempted one failed sally before their greatest warrior, Rhetogenes, successfully led a small band of men down the river past the blockade. Heading first to the Arevaci, his pleas were ignored. He then went to Lutia, where he was positively received by the youth, but the elders of the tribe warned Scipio, who marched from Numantia and arrested the 400 Lutian youths and cut off their hands. After Scipio's return, Avarus, the Numantine leader, began negotiations.

== Surrender ==
The first ambassadors sent by Numantia asked for their liberty in return for complete surrender, but Scipio refused. They were killed upon return by the incredulous populace, who believed they had cut a deal with the Romans. The city refused to surrender and starvation set in. Cannibalism ensued and eventually some began to commit suicide with their whole families. The remnant population finally surrendered late in the summer of 133 only after setting their city on fire. Scipio took it and had its ruins leveled.

== Legacy ==
The siege of Numantia was recorded by several Roman historians that admired the sense of freedom of the ancient Iberians and acknowledged their fighting skills against the Roman legions. Miguel de Cervantes (author of Don Quixote) wrote a play about the event, La Numancia, which stands today as his most well-known dramatic work. More recently, Carlos Fuentes has written a short story about the event, "The Two Numantias", published in his 1994 collection The Orange Tree. In 2017, the Spanish authorities organized a commemoration of the 2150th anniversary of the siege. Three ships of the Spanish Navy have borne the name Numancia in honor of the siege.

== See also ==
- Siege of Masada

== Sources ==
- Davis, Paul K. Besieged: 100 Great Sieges from Jericho to Sarajevo. Oxford University Press, 2001.
