= Scipio Aemilianus =

Roman politician and general (185–129 BC)

Publius Cornelius Scipio Aemilianus Africanus
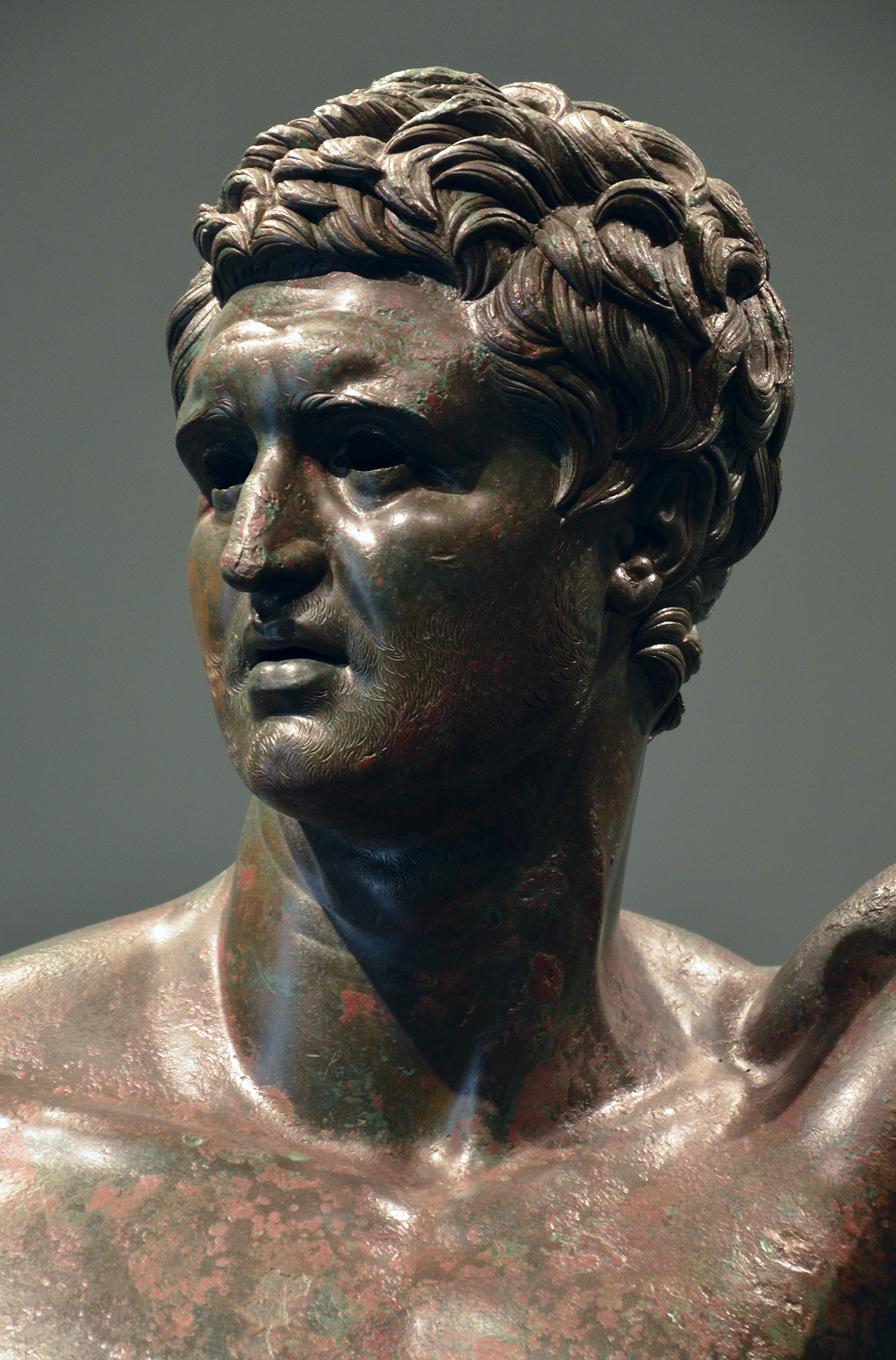
- The so-called "Hellenistic Prince", tentatively identified as Scipio Aemilianus
- Born: 185 BC
- Died: 129 BC (aged 55–56)
- Occupations: General; statesman
- Office: Consul (147, 134 BC)
- Spouse: Sempronia
- Relatives: Lucius Aemilius Paullus Macedonicus (father); Scipio Africanus (adoptive grandfather); Ti. Gracchus (brother-in-law); Gaius Gracchus (brother-in-law)
- Military career
- Rank: Proconsul
- Wars: Third Punic War • Battle of the Port of Carthage • Second Battle of Nepheris • Siege of Carthage; Numantine War • Siege of Numantia
- Awards: Mural Crown; Grass Crown; 2 Roman triumphs

Publius Cornelius Scipio Aemilianus Africanus (185 BC – 129 BC), known as Scipio Aemilianus or Scipio Africanus the Younger, was a Roman general and statesman noted for his military exploits in the Third Punic War against Carthage and during the Numantine War in Spain. He oversaw the final defeat and destruction of the city of Carthage. He was a prominent patron of writers and philosophers, the most famous of whom was the Greek historian Polybius. In politics, he opposed the populist reform program of his murdered brother-in-law, Tiberius Gracchus.

== Family ==
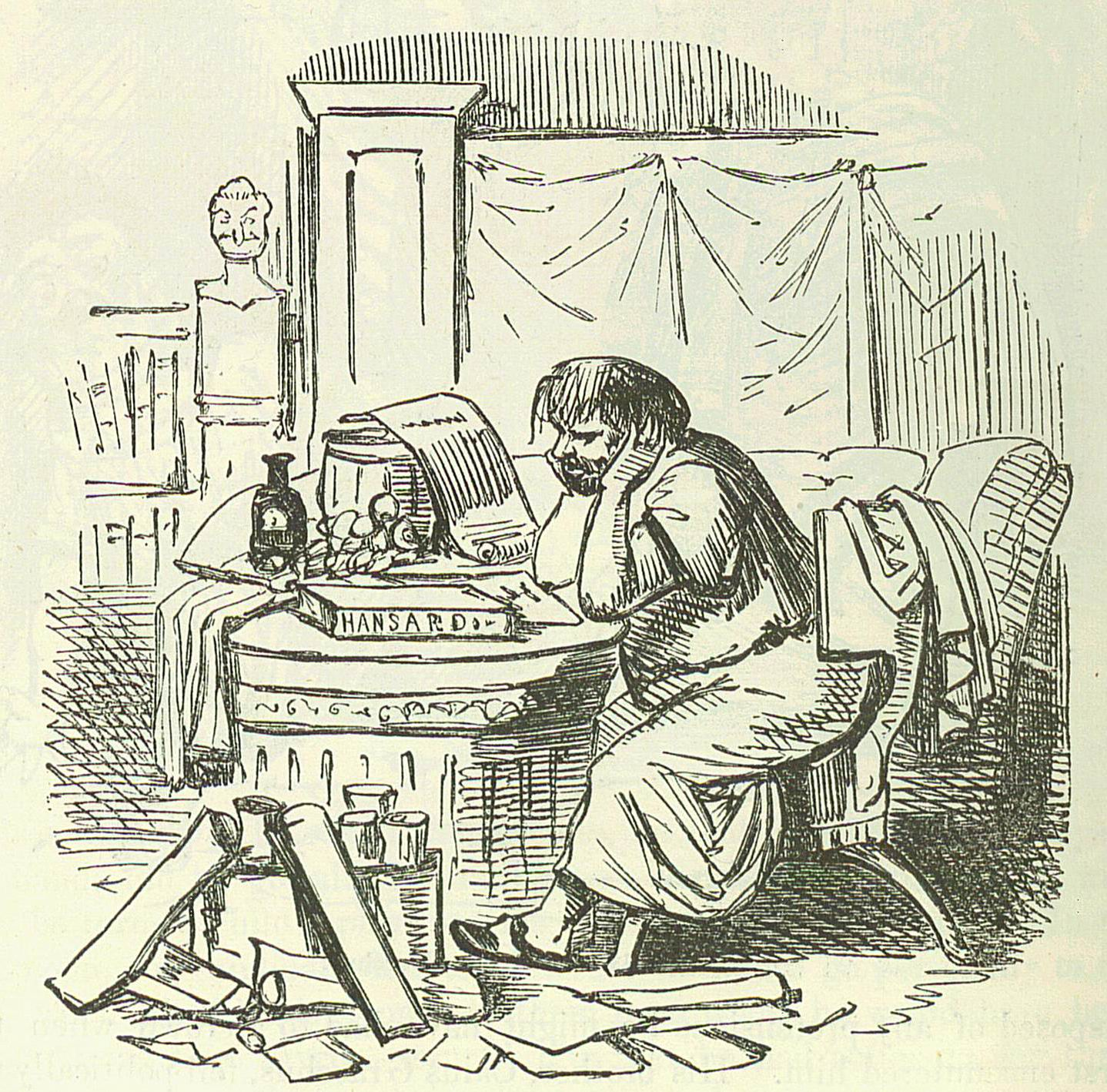
Scipio Aemilianus cramming himself for a speech after a hearty supper. Image by John Leech from The Comic History of Rome, by Gilbert Abbott à Beckett.

Scipio Aemilianus was the second son of Lucius Aemilius Paullus Macedonicus, the commander of the Romans' victorious campaign in the Third Macedonian War, and his first wife, Papiria Masonis. Scipio was adopted by his first cousin, Publius Cornelius Scipio, the eldest son of his aunt Aemilia Tertia and her husband Publius Cornelius Scipio Africanus, the acclaimed commander who won the decisive battle of the Second Punic War against Hannibal. This made Scipio Africanus the adoptive grandfather of Scipio Aemilianus. On adoption, he became Publius Cornelius Scipio Aemilianus, assuming the name of his adoptive father, but keeping Aemilianus as a fourth name to indicate his original nomen. His elder brother was adopted by a son or grandson of Quintus Fabius Maximus Verrucosus, another prominent commander in the Second Punic War, and his name became Quintus Fabius Maximus Aemilianus.

== Military career ==
=== First involvement in a war (Third Macedonian War, 171–168 BC) ===
Lucius Aemilius Paullus took his two older sons with him on his campaign in Greece. Plutarch wrote that Scipio was his favorite son because he "saw that he was by nature more prone to excellence than any of his brothers". He related that during mopping-up operations after the Battle of Pydna, Aemilius was worried because his younger son was missing. Plutarch also wrote that "The whole army learned of the distress and anguish of their general, and springing up from their suppers, ran about with torches, many to the tent of Aemilius, and many in front of the ramparts, searching among the numerous dead bodies. Dejection reigned in the camp, and the plain was filled with the cries of men calling out the name of Scipio. For from the very outset he had been admired by everybody, since, beyond any other one of his family, he had a nature adapted for leadership in war and public service. Well, then, when it was already late and he was almost despaired of, he came in from the pursuit with two or three comrades, covered with the blood of the enemies he had slain ..." Scipio Aemilianus was seventeen at the time.

=== First involvement in the Numantine War (151–150 BC) ===
In 152 BC, the consul Marcus Claudius Marcellus urged the Senate to conclude a peace with the Celtiberians. The Senate rejected this proposal, and instead sent one of the consuls of 151 BC, Lucius Licinius Lucullus, to Hispania to continue the war. However, there was a crisis of recruitment due to rumors of incessant battles and heavy Roman losses. Additionally, Marcellus appeared to be afraid of continuing the war; this led to panic. Young men avoided enrollment as soldiers through unverifiable excuses. Men eligible to be legates (legion commanders) or military tribunes (senior officers) did not volunteer.

Scipio Aemilianus was thought to have advised for the prosecution of the war. He asked the Senate to be sent to Hispania either as a military tribune or a legate, due to the urgency of the situation, even though it would have been safer to go to Macedon, where he had been invited to settle domestic disputes. The Senate was at first surprised. Ultimately, Scipio's decision made him popular, and many of those who had been avoiding their duty, ashamed by Scipio's example, began to volunteer as legates or to enroll as soldiers.

Scipio served under Lucullus. Velleius Paterculus wrote that Scipio was awarded a mural crown, which was a military decoration awarded to the soldier who first climbed the wall of a besieged city or fortress and successfully placed the military standard on it. Florus wrote that "having been challenged by [the Celtiberian] king to a single combat, carried off the spolia opima, the armor and arms stripped from the body of an opposing commander slain in single combat. These were regarded as the most honorable of all war trophies."

=== Third Punic War (149–146 BC) ===
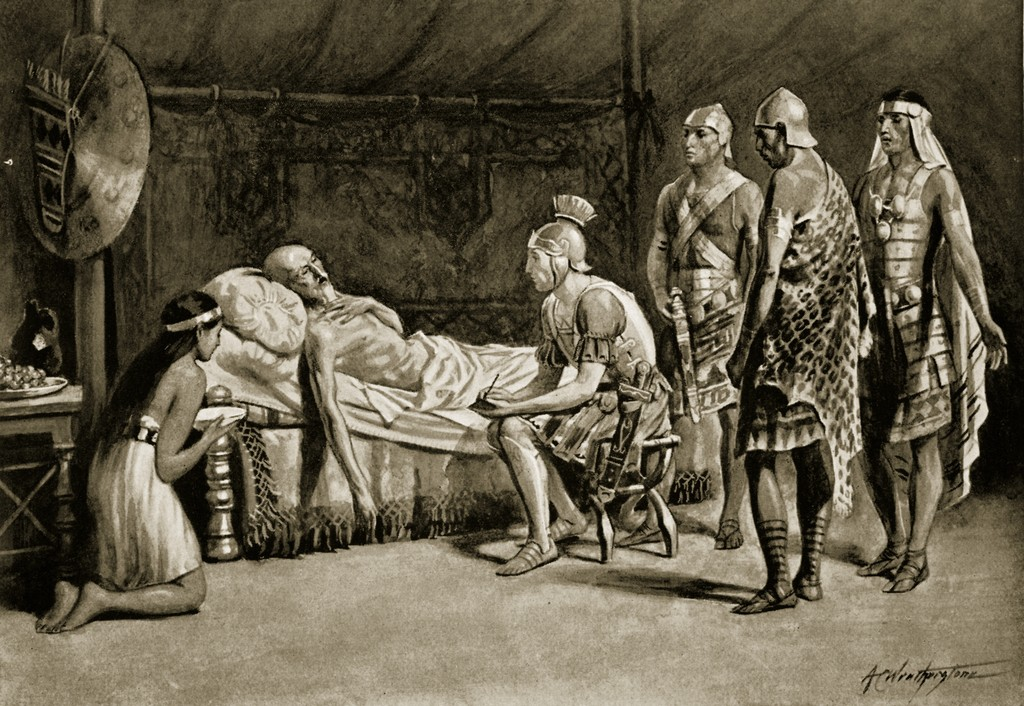
Scipio at the deathbed of Masinissa

Although the power of Carthage had been broken with her defeat in the Second Punic War, there was still lingering resentment in Rome. Cato the Elder ended every speech with, "Carthage must be destroyed." In 150 BC an appeal was made to Scipio Aemilianus by the Carthaginians to act as a mediator between them and the Numidian prince Massinissa who, supported by the anti-Carthaginian faction in Rome, was incessantly encroaching on Carthaginian territory. After winning the Second Punic War, Rome had mandated that Carthage could not defend itself militarily without seeking Rome's permission first. Rome construed Carthage's defense of itself against Numidians as a violation of this agreement. In 149 BC Rome declared war and a force was sent to besiege Carthage.

In the early stages of the war, the Romans suffered repeated defeats. Scipio Aemilianus was a military tribune (senior officer) and distinguished himself repeatedly: After a failed Roman attack into Carthage itself, it was Aemilianus who prevented a disaster by covering the army's retreat from the city. When the Carthaginians launched a surprise night-time attack on the camp of consul Censorinus, it was Aemilianus who rallied part of the cavalry, led them out of a rear gate and attacked the Carthaginians in the flank, driving them back to the city and restoring the situation. While collecting supplies from the countryside, Aemilius was one of the few who managed to prevent his foraging party from being ambushed. When the Carthaginians mounted another surprise night-time attack on a fort protecting the Roman transport ships, it was Aemilianus who led out his men and drove off the assault party using a clever stratagem. During a Roman attack on Hasdrubal's forces near Nepheris he again prevented disaster by checking the Carthaginian counter-attack which hit the Roman army when it was in a disadvantaged position.

In 147 BC he was elected consul, while still under the minimum age required by law to hold this office. Without the customary procedure of drawing lots, he was assigned to the African theater of war. After a year of desperate fighting and stubborn heroism on the part of the defenders, he took the city of Carthage, taking prisoner about 50,000 survivors (about one-tenth of the city's population). Complying with the mandate of the Senate, he ordered the city evacuated, burnt it, razed it to the ground and plowed it over, ending the Third Punic War. It was formerly believed that he also salted the city, but modern scholars have found no evidence for that. On his return to Rome he received a Triumph, having also established a personal claim to his adoptive agnomen of Africanus. According to Pliny the Elder he was also awarded the grass crown in Africa during the war.

=== Numantine War (143–133 BC) ===
In 134 BC Scipio was elected consul again because the citizens thought that he was the only man capable of defeating the Numantines in the Numantine War. The Celtiberians of the City of Numantia, which had strong defensive geographical features, held off the Romans for nine years. The army in Hispania was demoralized and ill-disciplined. Scipio concentrated on restoring discipline by forbidding luxuries the troops had become accustomed to, through regular tough exercises (all-day marches, building camps and fortifications and then demolishing them, digging ditches and then filling them up, and the like) and by enforcing regulations strictly. When he thought that the army was ready he encamped near Numantia. He did not proceed along the shorter route to avoid the guerrilla tactics the Numantines were good at. Instead, he made a detour though the land of the Vaccaei, who were selling food to the Numantines. He was ambushed several times but defeated the enemy. In one of these ambushes by a river which was difficult to cross, he was forced to make a detour along a longer route where there was no water. He marched at night when it was cooler and dug wells which had bitter water. He saved his men, but some horses and pack animals died of thirst. Then he passed through the territory of the Caucaei who had broken the treaty with Rome and declared that they could return safely to their homes. He returned to the Numantine territory and was joined by Jugurtha, the son of the king of Numidia, with archers, slingers, and twelve elephants.

Eventually, Scipio prepared to besiege Numantia. He asked the allied tribes in Hispania for specified numbers of troops. He built a circuit of fortifications which was nine kilometers long. The wall was three meters high and two and a half meters wide. He built an embankment of the same dimensions as the wall around the adjoining marsh. He built two towers by the River Durius (Douro) to which he moored large timbers with ropes which were full of knives and spear heads and were constantly kept in motion by the current. This prevented the enemy from slipping through covertly. He managed to force Numantia into starvation. The Numantines surrendered. Some killed themselves. Scipio sold the rest into slavery, destroyed the city and kept fifty men for his triumph. For his success Scipio Aemilianus received the additional agnomen of "Numantinus".

== Political career ==
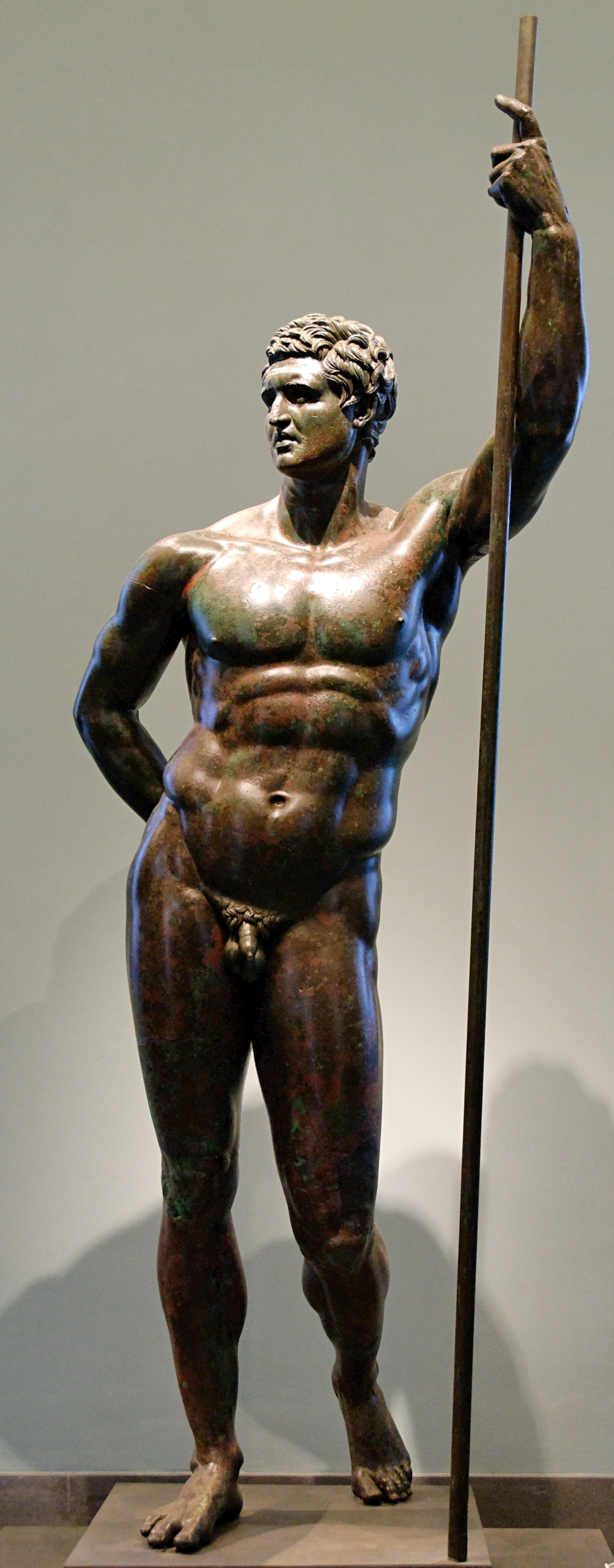
The Hellenistic Prince, a bronze statue made by a Greek artist in Rome, possibly depicting Scipio Aemilianus.

=== Censorship ===
In 142 BC Scipio Aemilianus was a censor. During his censorship, he endeavoured to check the growing luxury and immorality of the period. In 139 BC, he was unsuccessfully accused of high treason by Tiberius Claudius Asellus, whom he had degraded when censor. The speeches he gave on that occasion (now lost) were considered brilliant.

=== Tiberius Gracchus ===
Scipio helped his relative Tiberius Gracchus who in 137 BC had served in the Numantine War as a quaestor (treasurer) under the consul Gaius Hostilius Mancinus. The consul was pinned down by the enemy and, unable to escape, made a peace treaty. Tiberius negotiated the peace terms. The treaty was rejected by the senate as a disgrace. Plutarch wrote that "the relatives and friends of the soldiers, who formed a large part of the people" blamed this on Mancinus and insisted "that it was due to Tiberius that the lives of so many citizens had been saved". Those who disagreed with the violation of the treaty "cast forth those who had taken hand and share in the treaty, as for instance the quaestors and military tribunes, turning upon their heads the guilt of perjury and violation of the pact. In the present affair, indeed, more than at any other time, the people showed their good will and affection towards Tiberius. For they voted to deliver up the consul unarmed and in bonds to the Numantines, but spared all the other officers for the sake of Tiberius." Scipio used his influence to help to save the men "but none the less he was blamed for not saving Mancinus, and for not insisting that the treaty with the Numantines, which had been made through the agency of his kinsman and friend Tiberius, should be kept inviolate."

The Encyclopædia Britannica suggests that Scipio Aemilianus was not in sympathy with the optimates, the political faction which supported the aristocracy. Whatever the case, he was in disagreement with the militant actions of the movement led by Gracchus when he was a plebeian tribune, which pressed for a law to redistribute land to the poor. Plutarch wrote that "this disagreement certainly resulted in no mischief past remedy" and thought that if Scipio had been in Rome during the political activity of Gracchus, the latter would not have been murdered - he was fighting the war in Hispania. Still, he disliked the actions of Gracchus. Plutarch wrote "[while] at Numantia, when he learned of the death of Tiberius, he recited in a loud voice the verse of Homer: [from the Odyssey I.47] "So perish also all others who on such wickedness venture." Plutarch also wrote that (after his return to Rome) "when Gaius and Fulvius asked him in an assembly of the people what he thought about the death of Tiberius, he made a reply which showed his dislike of the measures advocated by him," this made him unpopular, "the people began to interrupt him as he was speaking, a thing which they had never done before, and Scipio himself was thereby led on to abuse the people." Gaius Papirius Carbo was a plebeian tribune and Marcus Fulvius Flaccus was a senator sympathetic to the Gracchian cause.

Scipio made himself unpopular again. Appian related that Fulvius Flaccus, Papirius Carbo and Tiberius’ younger brother, Gaius Sempronius Gracchus, chaired a commission to implement the Gracchian law. There never had been a land survey and land owners often did not have land deeds. The land was resurveyed. Some owners had to give up their orchards and farm buildings and go to empty land or move from cultivated to uncultivated land or swamps. As anyone was allowed to work undistributed land, many tilled land next to their own, blurring the demarcation between public and private land. Rome's Italian allies complained about lawsuits brought against them and chose Scipio Aemilianus to defend them. As the allies had fought in his wars, he accepted. In the senate Scipio did not criticise the Law, but argued that the cases should be heard by a court rather than the commission which did not have the confidence of the litigants. This was accepted and the consul Gaius Sempronius Tuditanus was appointed to give judgment. However, seeing that the job was difficult he found a pretext to fight a war in Illyria. The people were angry at Scipio "because they saw a man, in whose favour they had often opposed the aristocracy and incurred their enmity, electing him consul twice contrary to law, now taking the side of the Italian allies against themselves" His enemies claimed that he was determined to abolish the Gracchian law and was about to start "armed strife and bloodshed". When the people heard these allegations they were in a state of alarm until Scipio died at home in his bed; according to Appian, without a wound.

=== Death and possible assassination ===
Modern historians believe "there is no strong evidence or credible argument to support any alternative hypothesis [besides death by natural causes]." The ancient sources, however, record various rumours of foul play.

Appian wrote that it could not be known whether Scipio was murdered by Cornelia (mother of the Gracchi) and her daughter Sempronia (Scipio's wife), who were worried that the Gracchian law might be repealed; or whether he committed suicide because he saw that he could not deliver on his promises. He added that "[s]ome say that slaves under torture testified that unknown persons were introduced through the rear of the house by night who suffocated him, and that those who knew about it hesitated to tell because the people were angry with him still and rejoiced at his death."

Plutarch wrote that "although Scipio Africanus died at home after dinner, there is no convincing proof of the manner of his end, but some say that he died naturally, being of a sickly habit, some that he died of poison administered by his own hand, and some that his enemies broke into his house at night and smothered him. And yet Scipio's dead body lay exposed for all to see, and all who beheld it formed therefrom some suspicion and conjecture of what had happened to it." Elsewhere Plutarch writes that "no cause of such an unexpected death could be assigned; only some marks of blows upon his body seemed to intimate that he had suffered violence." The heaviest suspicions fell on Fulvius Flaccus, who "that very day had reflected upon Scipio in a public address to the people."

Gaius Gracchus also came under suspicion. However, "this great outrage, committed too upon the person of the greatest and most considerable man in Rome, was never either punished or inquired into thoroughly, for the populace opposed and hindered any judicial investigation, for fear that Gaius should be implicated in the charge if proceedings were carried on". Gaius Papirius Carbo also came under accusation. During a trial Lucius Licinius Crassus accused Carbo of being a party to the murder of Scipio.

== Personal character ==
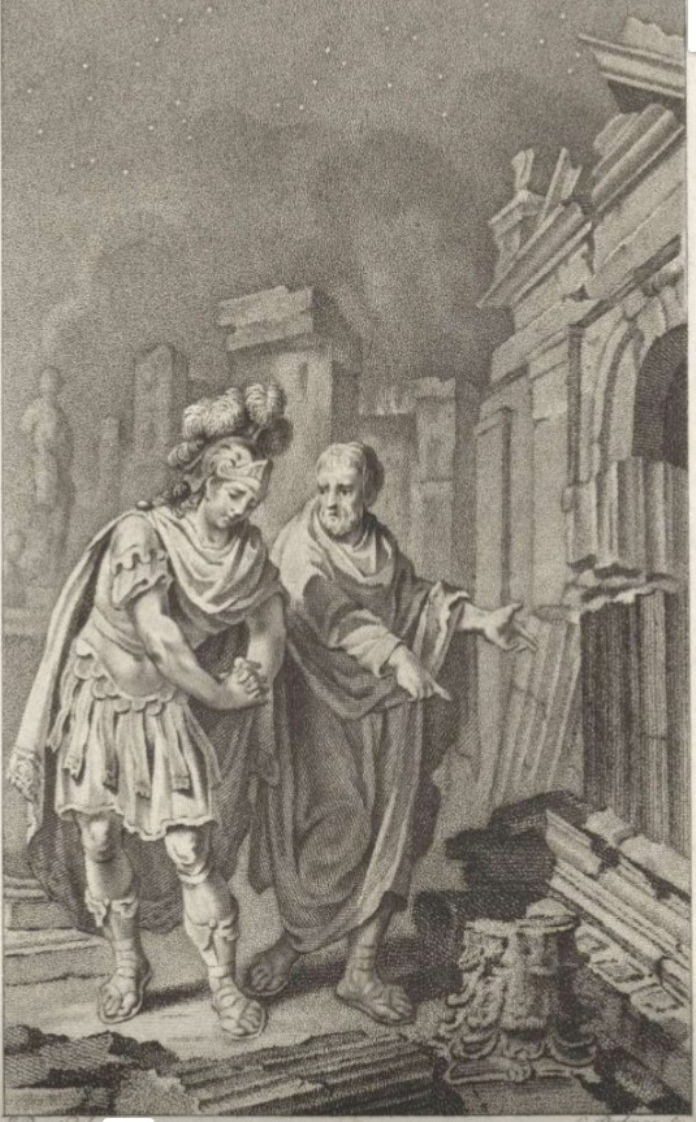
1797 engraving representing Scipio Aemilianus before the ruins of Carthage in 146 BC in the company of his friend Polybius

Velleius Paterculus wrote that Scipio was "a cultivated patron and admirer of liberal studies and of every form of learning, and kept constantly with him, at home and in the field, two men of eminent genius, Polybius and Panaetius. No one ever relieved the duties of an active life by a more refined use of his intervals of leisure than Scipio, or was more constant in his devotion to the arts either of war or peace. Ever engaged in the pursuit of arms or his studies, he was either training his body by exposing it to dangers or his mind by learning." Polybius mentioned going to Africa with Scipio to explore the continent. Gellius wrote that Scipio "used the purest diction of all men of his time". Cicero cited him among the orators who were "a little more emphatic than the ordinary, [but] never strained their lungs or shouted …" It seems that he had a good sense of humour and Cicero cited a number of anecdotes about his puns. He is also a central character in Cicero's dialogue De re publica, especially Book VI, a passage known as the Somnium Scipionis or "Dream of Scipio".

Culturally, Scipio Aemilianus was both philhellenic and conservative. He was the patron of the so-called Scipionic circle, a group of 15 to 27 philosophers, poets, and politicians. Besides Roman satirists and comedy writers such as Lucilius and Terence, there were Greek intellectuals, such as the scholar and historian Polybius and the Stoic philosopher Panaetius. Hence, Scipio had a philhellenic disposition (love and admiration for Greek culture). Such disposition was criticised by Roman traditionalists who disliked the growing Hellenisation of Rome—which, they thought, was corrupting Roman culture and life through alien influences—and advocated adherence to old Roman traditions and ancestral virtues and mores. Yet, Scipio was also a supporter of such traditions and mores. Gellius wrote that when he was censor, Scipio made a speech "urging the people to follow the customs of their forefathers". He criticised several things which "were done contrary to the usage of our forefathers," and found fault with adoptive sons being of profit to their adoptive father in gaining the rewards of paternity, and said: "A father votes in one tribe, the son in another, an adopted son is of as much advantage as if one had a son of his own; orders are given to take the census of absentees, and hence it is not necessary for anyone to appear in person at the census."

Gellius wrote that after he was censor, Scipio was accused before the people by Tiberius Claudius Asellus, a plebeian tribune, whom he had stripped of his knighthood during his censorship. He does not mention what the accusation was. Although under accusation, Scipio did not stop to shave and to wear white clothing and did not appear in the garb of those under accusation. He added that in those days noblemen started shaving in middle age. The satirist Lucilius wrote a verse about the episode: "Thus base Asellus did great Scipio taunt: Unlucky was his censorship and bad."

Polybius relates a well-known anecdote of Scipio's reflections on the mutability of human affairs following the sack of Carthage:

Scipio, when he looked upon the city as it was utterly perishing and in the last throes of its complete destruction, is said to have shed tears and wept openly for his enemies. After being wrapped in thought for long, and realizing that all cities, nations, and authorities must, like men, meet their doom; that this happened to Ilium, once a prosperous city, to the empires of Assyria, Media, and Persia, the greatest of their time, and to Macedonia itself, the brilliance of which was so recent, either deliberately or the verses escaping him, he said:

A day will come when sacred Troy shall perish,
And Priam and his people shall be slain.

And when Polybius speaking with freedom to him, for he was his teacher, asked him what he meant by the words, they say that without any attempt at concealment he named his own country, for which he feared when he reflected on the fate of all things human. Polybius actually heard him and recalls it in his history.

== In popular culture ==
Scipio Aemilianus is portrayed as a young boy in the household of his adopted grandfather in the 1971 film Scipio the African. The name "Scipio" was used in the animated series, Code Lyoko in reference to the general's destruction of Carthage. He is also portrayed in the anime Drifters. His figure also appeared in the game Rise of Kingdoms as one of the commanders that excelled at leading rallies. He is also mentioned in The Forever War by Joe Haldeman.

== See also ==
- Scipio–Paullus–Gracchus family tree

== Notes ==
Political offices
Preceded by Sp. Postumius Albinus Magnus; L. Calpurnius Piso Caesoninus	Roman consul 147 BC; With: Gaius Livius Drusus	Succeeded by Gn. Cornelius Lentulus; L. Mummius Achaicus
Preceded by Ser. Fulvius Flaccus; Q. Calpurnius Piso	Roman consul 134 BC; With: Gaius Fulvius Flaccus	Succeeded by P. Mucius Scaevola; L. Calpurnius Piso Frugi
