= Numancia de la Sagra =

- municipality
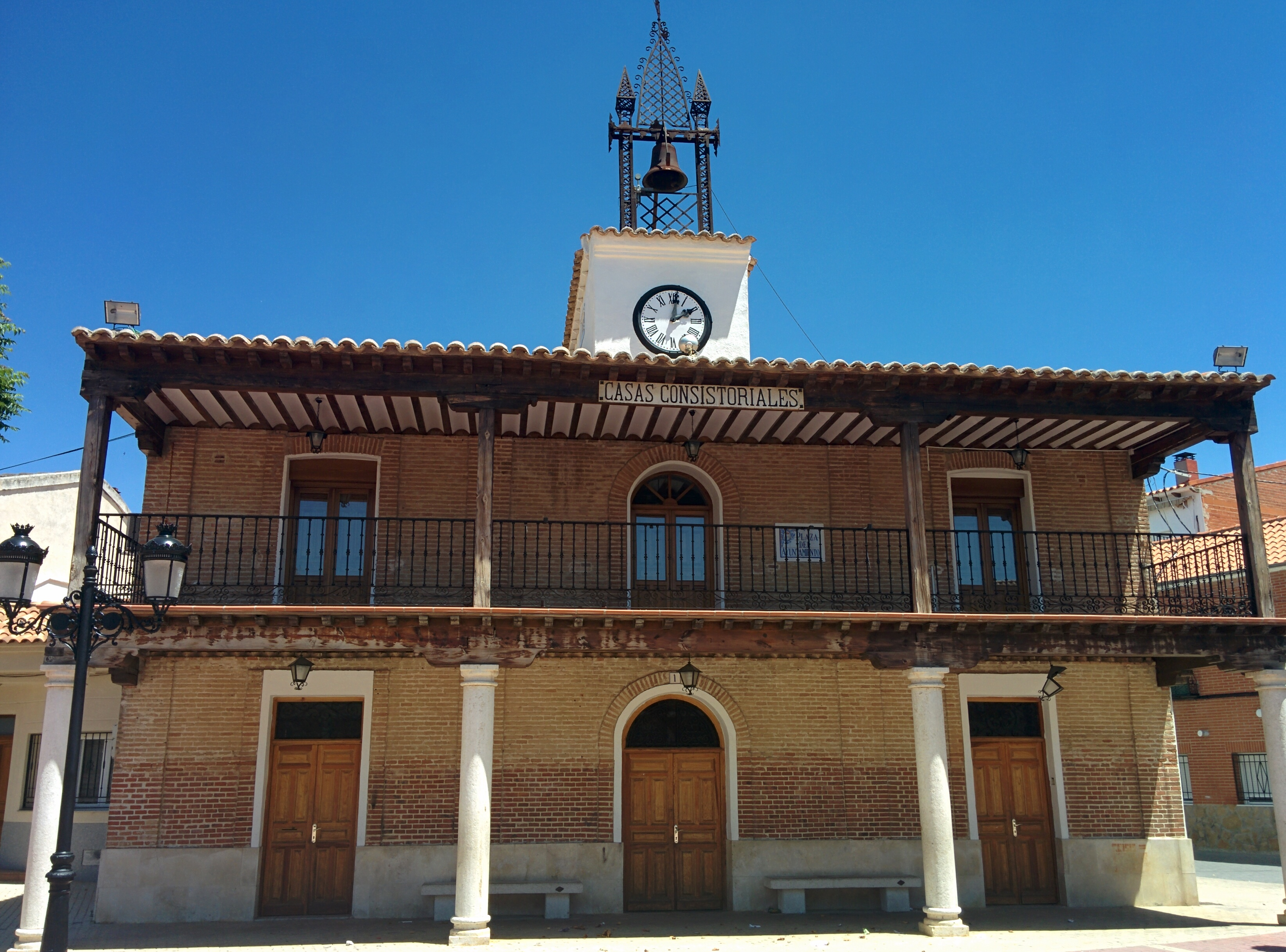
- Town Hall of Numancia de la Sagra

- Flag Coat of arms
- Interactive map of Numancia de la Sagra
- Coordinates: 40.09°N 3.85°W
- Country: Spain
- Autonomous community: Castile-La Mancha
- Province: Toledo

Area
  - Total: 29.63 km^{2} (11.44 sq mi)
- Elevation: 642 m (2,106 ft)

Population (2025-01-01)
  - Total: 5,674
  - Density: 191.5/km^{2} (496.0/sq mi)
- Time zone: UTC+1 (CET)
  - Summer (DST): UTC+2 (CEST)

Numancia de la Sagra is a municipality located in the province of Toledo, Castile-La Mancha, Spain. According to the 2021 census (INE), the municipality has a population of 5,170 inhabitants.

Originally named Azaña (from medieval Latin Façania), it was captured by the Numancia regiment in 1936 during the Spanish Civil War, and was renamed by the Francoist regime to remove the association with the Republican president Manuel Azaña.
