= Paesuri =

Pre-Roman people of Lusitania

Main language areas in Iberia c. 300 BC

The Paesuri or Paesures were an ancient pre-Roman people of Lusitania, akin to the Lusitani, to whom they were a dependent tribe.

== Origins ==
Mentioned by Pliny the Elder and by a local epigraphic source, the 2nd Century AD Ponte de Alcântara inscription, near Cáceres, along with the other Lusitani tribes, their ethnic and Linguistic affiliation has not yet been fully determined. It has been suggested that the Paesuri were of Thracian origin, though to what extent they were celticized by their neighbors, the Lusitani, Gallaeci and Turduli Veteres, remains unclear.

== Location ==
Located between the rivers Douro and Vacua or Vagua (Vouga), in the modern northern central Portugal, the Paesuri comprised four subtribes – Ireucutiori, Aravoni, Seareae and Paesicaeci or Paesici – which settled the mountains of Freita, Arada, and the northern slopes of Caramulo around the 5th Century BC.

== History ==
Like their neighbours the Turduli Veteres and Gallaeci, the Paesuri did not fell under Carthaginian rule at the later 3rd Century BC and appear to have not taken part in the Second Punic War. It is still not clear if they played any significant role in the Lusitanian Wars of the 2nd century BC. Allied with the Lusitani, they bore the brunt of the first Roman thrusts into the Iberian northwest. In 138-136 BC Consul Decimus Junius Brutus certainly devastated their lands during his punitive campaign against the Lusitani and the Turduli Veteres. Again the Paesuri suffered the same treatment in 61-60 BC, when they were forcibly incorporated into Hispania Ulterior province by the Propraetor Julius Caesar.

=== Romanization ===
They were later aggregated by Emperor Augustus into the province of Lusitania in 27-13 BC.

== See also ==
- Bardili (Turduli)
- Gallaeci
- Turduli
- Turduli Oppidani
- Turduli Veteres
- Thracians
- Pre-Roman peoples of the Iberian Peninsula
