= Gaius Hostilius Mancinus =

Roman consul in 137 BC

Gaius Hostilius Mancinus (fl. 140–135 BC) was a politician and general of the Roman Republic. He is mostly known for his defeat against the Numantines as consul in 137 BC and the humiliating treaty he signed afterwards in order to save his army.

Mancinus was born no later than 179 BC as a member of the plebeian gens Hostilia. He was elected as praetor around 140 BC, in which capacity he presided over a senatorial vote on a dispute between Narthakion and Melitaia, two cities in Thessaly allied to Rome. In 137 BC, he was elected consul and sent to command Roman forces in the Numantine War against the settlement of Numantia in Hispania. Following a series of defeats, he concluded a peace treaty with the Numantines, which preserved Numantia's independence and surrendered the Roman army's weapons and baggage to the Numantines.

In Rome, many senators were outraged by the treaty, notably Scipio Aemilianus, one of the most influential politicians of the period. During the ensuing debate, both the supporters and the critics of the treaty produced coinage and promulgated contradictory historical precedents as propaganda. The affair marked the beginning of Tiberius Gracchus' political career; he led the negotiations with the Numantines as a member of Mancinus' staff and supported the treaty in the senate. However, the senate ultimately rejected the treaty and, to avoid breaking Mancinus' religious oaths, surrendered him in chains to the Numantines. Mancinus won approval in Rome by making a speech before the senate in which he accepted his fate and affirmed his commitment to the oaths he had sworn.

However, as the Numantines refused to take him, Mancinus again returned to Rome, but was declared to have forfeited his citizenship and so to be ineligible to resume his place in the senate. Once home he ordered a statue to be made of himself naked and in chains as a reminder to himself of his willingness to sacrifice himself for the good of the republic. Thanks to his courageous behaviour during the affair, he recovered some popularity and was able to have legislation passed restoring his citizenship. He was later successful in securing a second praetorship, restoring him to the senate.

== Family background ==
Mancinus belonged to the plebeian gens Hostilia, which emerged in the late 3rd century. Its first consul was Mancinus' father, Aulus Hostilius Mancinus in 170. In 145, Aulus' nephew and Mancinus' cousin, Lucius Hostilius Mancinus, was consul. Lucius claimed to have been the first Roman soldier to break through the walls of Carthage during the Third Punic War, and based his electoral campaign on his military achievements, earning him and his family the enmity of Scipio Aemilianus, a leading politician in the period who had received a triumph as the proconsul in command of the victorious armies. Lucius Mancinus also had an elder brother named Aulus, who was possibly aedile in 151.

== Career ==
=== Praetorship (c. 140 BC) ===
By 140, Mancinus was elected praetor; the office required a minimum age of thirty-nine, placing his birth no later than 179. He was probably the urban praetor (praetor urbanus), because he presided over the senate during the vote on the senatus consultum de Narthaciensibus et Melitaeensibus, which arbitrated a border dispute between Narthakion and Melitaia, two Thessalian cities allied with Rome. Indeed, the urban praetor often acted as the head of state when the consuls were absent (because they served in the province), notably by presiding over the senate. In the second century, when dealing with allies' territories, the senate usually returned to the situation at the date of the initial treaty with Rome, but in this affair, the border dispute had arisen after Melitaia's alliance with Rome, but before Narkathion's, so both had a valid claim. The senate therefore chose to revert to the situation at the time of Titus Quinctius Flamininus, who as proconsul had established the Thessalian League in 195, and sided with Narthakion.

=== Consulship and the Numantine affair (137–136 BC) ===
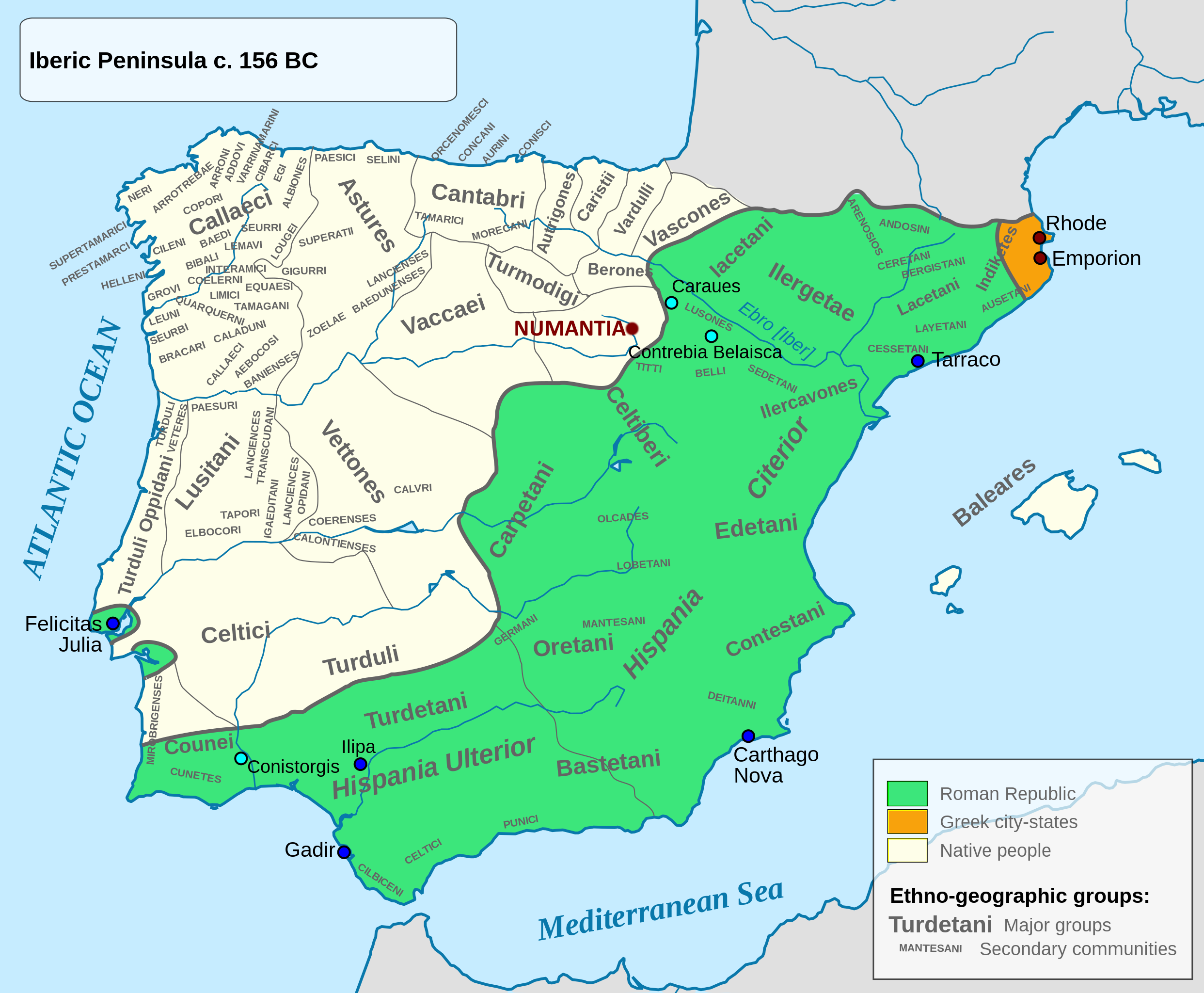
Spain and Numantia in the middle of the 2nd century BC

Mancinus was elected consul for 137 with Marcus Aemilius Lepidus Porcina as his colleague. Political life of the period was largely impacted by the difficult Numantine War in Hispania. In order to reduce competition for military commands in Hispania, the senate adopted a system of pairing a consul with a proconsul (who was consul the previous year) in the two provinces of the region (which were normally awarded to praetors). Decimus Junius Brutus, consul in 138, was therefore given Hispania Ulterior, while Mancinus received Hispania Citerior.

During the campaign against Numantia, Mancinus suffered several defeats until he was trapped and surrounded by 4,000 Numantine soldiers, although his army was five times as numerous. (Note: Appian, Roman History, 80.) The place was possibly the village of Renieblas, where the consul Quintus Fulvius Nobilior had been also trapped in 153. Mancinus felt that he had no other choice but to negotiate with the Numantines, and ordered his quaestor (a junior financial magistrate), Tiberius Sempronius Gracchus to deal with them. Tiberius' father had also fought the Numantines some decades earlier and left a favourable impression on them. Tiberius negotiated a peace by which the 20,000 Roman soldiers would be spared and the boundaries of Roman territory preserved, in exchange for the army's weapons and baggage. A few years earlier, in 140, the proconsul Quintus Pompeius had also negotiated a treaty with the Numantines, but it was repudiated by the senate. This time, the Numantines demanded that Mancinus and his staff swear religious oaths to uphold the treaty.

However, in Rome it was felt that the only acceptable outcome of the war would be a capitulation (deditio). When news of the treaty reached the senate in Rome, it consequently caused a "massive political storm". Mancinus was immediately stripped of his command and recalled; the other consul Lepidus Porcina replaced him. A Numantine delegation was nevertheless allowed to come to Rome, because Mancinus' treaty was still formally in place. The senate then likely delayed any discussion of the matter until Mancinus' consulship elapsed. The new consuls for 136 were supporters of Scipio Aemilianus, Mancinus' enemy. Mancinus and his officers, especially Tiberius Gracchus, defended themselves and the treaty they had reached on two grounds: that the troops with which he had to fight were lazy and undertrained due to his predecessor's incompetence – itself evidenced by his predecessor too had lost battles against the same foe – and that the war had been renewed in violation of Pompeius' treaty and therefore was inauspicious. (Note: Appian, Roman History, 83.) These defences were generally consistent with aristocratic thinking about the aetiology of military defeat, which tended to place blame on the soldiers and poor relations with the gods rather than the actions of senatorial commanders.

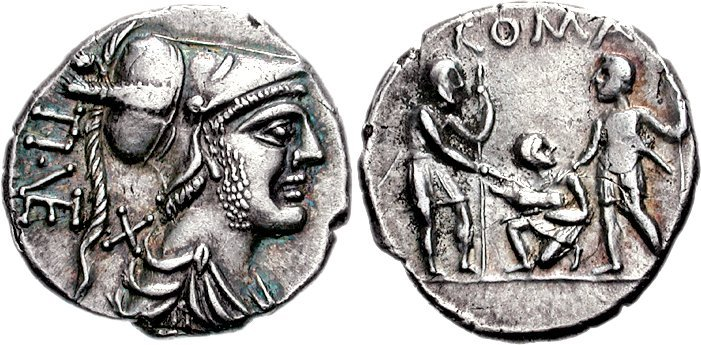
Denarius minted by Tiberius Veturius in 137 BC in support of Mancinus' treaty with the Numantines. The coin shows an oath taken by Romans and non-Romans.

A rare contemporary source of the event is a denarius (a silver coin) minted by the triumvir monetalis Tiberius Veturius Gracchus in 137. This coin set a milestone in Roman coinage as it broke from the traditional civic symbols of the Republic and featured instead personal and political imageries. The reverse shows a scene of oath, with a Roman pictured on the right, a non-Roman on the left; they are both depicting touching their sword on a pig about to be sacrificed by a third character kneeling. The scene likely depicts aftermath of the disaster of the Caudine Forks in 321, during which a Roman army was trapped by the Samnites and forced to negotiate an unfavourable peace. The army was led by Titus Veturius Calvinus, a distant ancestor of the moneyer, who was also a cousin of Tiberius Gracchus (Mancinus' quaestor). At this time, the scene can have only been a reference to Mancinus' treaty, by insisting on fides Romana (Rome's good faith or reliability) and respecting the oaths. It seems that two versions of the Caudine Forks story circulated at the time: one in which the Romans kept their oath, while the other told how the Romans broke the treaty and defeated the Samnites the following year. The latter story is fictitious and partially built on the development of Mancinus' case. The version supporting Mancinus was nevertheless abandoned and only the invented version survived in subsequent Roman historiography, such as in Livy's Ab Urbe Condita written a century later.

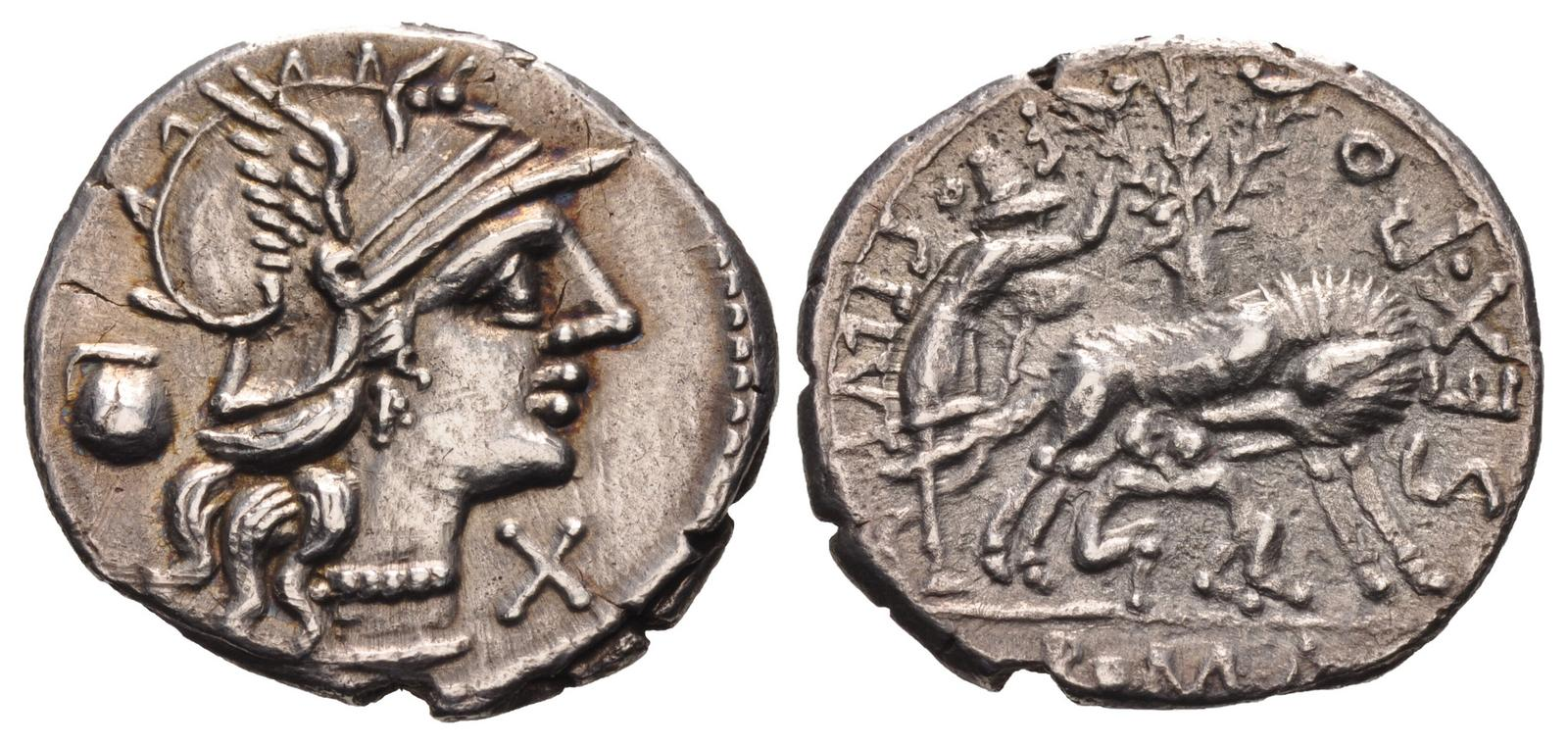
Denarius minted by Sextus Pompeius in 137 to oppose Mancinus' treaty. The reverse shows the finding by the shepherd Faustulus of the she-wolfsuckling Romulus and Remus.

Another moneyer in 137, Sextus Pompeius, minted a denarius with a reverse showing she-wolf suckling the twins Romulus and Remus. This scene has been interpreted by numismatist Michael Crawford as reflecting the imperial claims of Rome, therefore opposing Mancinus' treaty with the Numantines. Crawford also suggests that this Sextus Pompeius might have been related to the consul of 141, who spoke against Mancinus' treaty.

The main difficulty for the senate in repudiating Mancinus' treaty was the religious oath he and his staff swore on behalf of the Roman people, as breaking it would have damaged the relationship between the Roman people and their gods, known as the pax deorum. The senate commissioned the consul Lucius Furius Philus to find a solution (Rosenstein 1986, p. 245; Rosenstein mistakenly uses the praenomen Publius for Furius Philus, instead of Lucius). Philus was a good friend of Scipio Aemilianus and member of the Scipionic Circle around him. Scipio and another friend Laelius were moreover members of Philus' consilium (advisory council). Philus' solution was to consider that the person who made the illegal treaty had to be repudiated and returned to the other party, probably by misrepresenting the Caudine Forks story as precedent. Philus drafted three bills to put before one of the citizens' assemblies. The first proposed sending Mancinus to the Numantines as a prisoner, the second proposed the same for Mancinus' staff (including Tiberius Gracchus), and the third for Pompeius, the former consul of 141 and Scipio's bitter enemy. These proposals were approved by the senate for ratification by the assembly. After the senate voted to surrender him, Mancinus accepted his fate and even supported his own punishment, speaking to that effect before the assembly, as it was the only way for him to respect his oath. Voters nevertheless rejected the bills exiling Tiberius Gracchus and Pompeius, thanks to the two men's popularity. By separating Mancinus from his staff, it seems that Scipio wanted to spare his brother-in-law Tiberius Gracchus. The consul Philus then went to Spain accompanied by the fetial priests, who supervised the surrender of Mancinus to the Numantines, according to an archaic ritual. Mancinus was placed naked and bound in chains before the gates of Numantia, where he remained until nightfall, but the Numantines refused to take him, and he was brought back to Rome. (Note: Appian, Roman History, 83.) (Note: Velleius Paterculus, ii.1 § 5.)

The classicist Alan Astin considers that Scipio Aemilianus was the main instigator and victor of the sequence against Mancinus.

=== From demotion to rehabilitation (after 135 BC) ===
After the whole incident, Mancinus returned to Rome and again took up his seat in the senate. It seems he was confirmed by the censors who wrote the list of senators (lectio senatus) in 136. These censors were indeed sympathetic to Mancinus: Appius Claudius Pulcher was the father-in-law of Tiberius Gracchus; his censorial colleague, Quintus Fulvius Nobilior, had similarly been defeated by the Numantines in 153. However, Publius Rutilius, a tribune of the plebs, contested the lectio, and argued that Mancinus had lost his citizenship after his ritual surrender. A trial took place, and the jury adopted Rutilius' opinion; the distinguished jurist and praetor that year Publius Mucius Scaevola spoke against Mancinus at this occasion. (Note: Cicero Epistulae ad Atticum xii.5; De oratore, i.181.) Rutilius' motivation was possibly to settle a score against Pulcher and Tiberius Gracchus, whose fathers as censors had removed his uncle from his equestrian status in the lectio of 169.

After his demotion, Mancinus started a campaign to recover his citizenship, as well as his social position and honour. Like his cousin Lucius, who had made a painting of the siege of Carthage to glorify his role during the war, Mancinus used visual arts for his bid, and commissioned a statue that represented him with the appearance he had when surrendered to the Numantines, naked and in chains. This statue is mentioned by Pliny the Elder in his Natural History (written in the 1st century AD). It is the earliest known statue depicting a Roman citizen in the nude; portraits of the time generally showed men in a toga or military uniform. (Note: Pliny, Natural History, xxxiv.18.) Mancinus' story of his voluntary sacrifice to keep his oath and preserve the diplomatic reputation of Rome brought him admiration among citizens. Cicero and Plutarch later mentioned him favourably. (Note: Cicero, De re publica, iii.14.) (Note: Plutarch, Tiberius Gracchus, 5 § 4.) Perhaps soon after 135, a bill was carried in the assembly granting him citizenship anew. (Note: Digest, l.7 § 17.) Mancinus did not stop there and sought to regain his place in the senatorial order by resuming his political career. He was successful in being elected to a second praetorship, which guaranteed him a place in the senate at the next lectio. Second praetorships were rare during the Republic and may have been a way of rehabilitating disgraced politicians.

== Bibliography ==
=== Ancient sources ===
- Appian, Roman History.
- Cicero, De re publica, De Oratore, Epistulae ad Atticum.
- The Digest.
- Pliny the Elder, Natural history.
- Plutarch, Parallel Lives (Life of Tiberius Gracchus on Wikisource).
- Velleius Paterculus, Historiae Romanae.

=== Modern sources ===
- Astin, Alan Edgar (1967). Scipio Aemilianus. Oxford: Clarendon Press. ISBN 0-19-814257-9. OCLC 928115.
- Badian, Ernst (1968). "Sulla's augurate". Arethusa. 1 (1): 26–46. ISSN 0004-0975. JSTOR 26307042.
- Brennan, T. Corey (1989). "C. Aurelius Cotta, Praetor Iterum (CIL I^{2}. 610)". Athenaeum (77): 467–487.
- Brennan, T. Corey (2000). The praetorship in the Roman republic. Oxford: Oxford University Press. ISBN 0-19-511459-0. OCLC 41503761.
- Brennan, T. Corey (2006). "Power and Process under the Republican "Constitution"". In Flower, Harriet (ed.). The Cambridge Companion to the Roman Republic. Cambridge: Cambridge University Press. pp. 31–65. ISBN 978-1-1390-0033-8.
- Briscoe, John (1981). A Commentary on Livy, Books XXXIV-XXXVII. Oxford: Clarendon Press. ISBN 0-19-814455-5.
- Broughton, Thomas Robert Shannon (1951). The magistrates of the Roman republic. Vol. 1. New York: American Philological Association.
- Chaniotis, Angelos (2004). "Justifying territorial claims in classical and hellenistic Greece: the beginnings of international law". In Harris, Edward Monroe; Rubinstein, Lene (eds.). The law and the courts in ancient Greece. London: Duckworth. pp. 185–213. ISBN 0-7156-3117-9. OCLC 55014391.
- Crawford, Michael H. (1973). "Foedus and sponsio". Papers of the British School at Rome. 41: 1–7. doi:10.1017/S0068246200008011. ISSN 0068-2462. JSTOR 40310700. S2CID 162870895.
- Crawford, Michael H. (1974). Roman republican coinage. Cambridge University Press. ISBN 0-521-07492-4. OCLC 310578773.
- Etcheto, Henri (2012). Les Scipions. Famille et pouvoir à Rome à l'époque républicaine. Bordeaux: Ausonius Éditions. ISBN 978-2-35613-124-9.
- Gruen, Erich S. (1968). Roman politics and the criminal courts, 149-78 B.C. Harvard University Press. ISBN 978-0-674-28421-0. OCLC 576654216.
- Harlow, Mary; Laurence, Ray (2002). Growing Up and Growing Old in Ancient Rome: A Life Course Approach. London and New York: Routledge. ISBN 978-0-415-20200-8.
- Münzer, Friedrich (1913). "Hostilius 18". In Pauly, August (ed.). Realencyclopädie der Classischen Altertumswissenschaft (in German). Vol. 16. Stuttgart: J. B. Metzler. cols. 2508–2511.
- Oakley, Stephen P (2005). A commentary on Livy, Books VI-X. Vol. 3. Oxford: Clarendon Press. ISBN 978-0-1992-7143-6. OCLC 34546163.
- Rosenstein, Nathan (1986). ""Imperatores victi": the case of C Hostilius Mancinus". Classical Antiquity. 5 (2): 230–252. doi:10.2307/25010850. ISSN 0278-6656. JSTOR 25010850.
- Sherk, Robert K. (1984). Translated Documents of Greece and Rome vol. 4, Rome and the Greek East to the Death of Augustus. Cambridge University Press. ISBN 978-0-521-27123-3.
- Steel, Catherine (2013). The end of the Roman republic, 149 to 44 BC: conquest and crisis. Edinburgh History of Ancient Rome. Edinburgh University Press. ISBN 978-0-7486-1944-3.
- Zmeskal, Klaus (2009). Adfinitas (in German). Vol. 1. Passau: Verlag Karl Stutz. ISBN 978-3-88849-304-1.

Preceded by Publius Cornelius Scipio Nasica Serapio and Decimus Junius Brutus Callaicus	Consul of the Roman Republic with Marcus Aemilius Lepidus Porcina; 137 BC	Succeeded by Lucius Furius Philus and Sextus Atilius Serranus
