= Turduli Veteres =

Pre-Roman tribe of Lusitania

Turduli Veteres' towns on a map of modern Portugal

Migrations of pre-Romanic tribes in the territory of present-day Portugal: Pink: Turduli Brown: Celtici Blue: Lusitani

The Turduli Veteres, translated as "Ancient Turduli" or "Old Turduli" were an ancient pre-Roman tribe of present day Portugal, akin to the Calaicians or Gallaeci and Lusitanians.

== Location ==
The Turduli Veteres territory was located south of the estuary of the river Douro, in the north of modern Portugal, being neighbors of the Paesuri. Their capital was Langobriga (Fiães – Santa Maria da Feira); other Turduli Veteres' towns were Talabriga (situated either in the vicinity of Branca, Albergaria-a-Velha or Marnel, Lamas do Vouga – Águeda) and possibly Oppidum Vacca (Cabeço do Vouga – Águeda). They also dwelt around Vila Nova de Gaia as evidenced by the two bronze plaques (Tesserae Hospitales) found in Monte Murado in Pedroso.

== History ==
The Turduli Veteres appear to have originated as an off-shot of the Turduli of ancient south-west Iberia. Alongside the Celtici, the Turduli Veteres migrated northwards around the 5th century BC, before settling in a coastal region situated along the lower Douro and Vacca (Vouga) river basins (i.e. north-western parts of present-day Beira Litoral).

Unlike related and neighbouring peoples, the Turduli Veteres did not fall under Carthaginian rule during the later 3rd Century BC. Neither is there any evidence that they took part in the Second Punic War. It is still not clear if they played any significant role in the Lusitanian Wars of the 2nd century BC. Moreover, the Turduli Veteres, unlike the Turduli Oppidani (located in the west coastal areas of modern Portugal), appear to have remained independent until the late 2nd century BC and to have resisted attempts by the Lusitani and Gallaeci to incorporate them into their respective tribal federations.

=== Roman incursions, dominance and Romanization ===
Being relatively unaccustomed to interaction with and dominance by other peoples, the Turduli Veteres (like the Lusitani and Gallaeci), bore the brunt of the first Roman forays into north-west Iberia. According to Roman accounts, the Veteres supported the Lusitani and in 138-136 BC, the Roman Consul Decimus Junius Brutus retaliated by temporarily occupying the Veteres' hillfort of Talabriga and laid waste to a significant proportion of the Veteres' lands. In 61-60 BC, the Veteres and the Oppidani were defeated and incorporated into Hispania Ulterior province by the Propraetor Julius Caesar. In 27-13 BC, the Turduli Veteres were in turn aggregated into the Roman province of Lusitania during the reign of Emperor Augustus.

== See also ==
- Bardili (Turduli)
- Gallaeci
- Gallaecia
- Paesuri
- Pre-Roman peoples of the Iberian Peninsula
- Turduli
- Turduli Oppidani
