= Marcus Aemilius Lepidus Porcina =

2nd-century BC Roman consul

Marcus Aemilius Lepidus Porcina was a consul of the Roman Republic in 137 BC. He was sent to replace his colleague in command of the war against Numantia but was defeated after starting a new war with a tribe in the region, leading to his recall to Rome in disgrace.

== Career ==
The first office which Lepidus is known to have held is the praetorship; Thomas Robert Shannon Broughton, in Magistrates of the Roman Republic, dates this praetorship tentatively to 143 BC. In his year as praetor, he acted contrary to the Sibylline Oracles to support a project to build an aqueduct to bring water to the Capitoline Hill.

Lepidus was elected consul prior for 137 BC with Gaius Hostilius Mancinus as his colleague. During his time in the city, he unsuccessfully opposed a proposal of Lucius Cassius Longinus Ravilla, who at the time as plebeian tribune, which would introduce secret ballot for all popular trials – trials held before the people in an assembly – except for charges of perduellio. After Mancinus was defeated by the Numantines and reached a humiliating treaty with them, Mancinus' command was revoked and Lepidus was sent as replacement.

Lepidus arrived in Hispania Citerior to replace Mancinus, still during his consulship. He moved quickly to make war on the Vaccaei, a tribe in the region likely aiding the Numantines; to aid him, he convinced his brother-in-law and governor of Hispania Ulterior, Decimus Junius Brutus Callaicus, to join him. They then put the Vaccaei's largest city, Pallantia, to siege. By this time, the year had ended and Lepidus' command had been prorogued pro consule. When the senate heard news of this, it sent a delegation to Lepidus and Brutus, chastising them for starting new wars when those which Rome was already fighting had gone so badly and decreeing that they should desist. Lepidus sent a reply saying it was too dangerous to abandon the war on the Vaccaei and continued operations.

Appian, in Wars in Spain, reports that a protracted siege that saw the Romans run out of food. The two commanders persist but eventually have to give up and retreat. The Romans then withdraw in a disorderly manner – even abandoning their sick and wounded – and are attacked on the way out, suffering heavy casualties. When news of this defeat reached Rome, the senate stripped Lepidus of his command and imperium. When he returned to Rome as a private citizen, the senate fined him for good measure. He was the first command to ever have his promagisterial imperium abrogated by the senate.

Lepidus was by 125 BC for many years an augur (he had entered into the augurate at least by 129 BC). In that year he was prosecuted by the censors. According to Velleius Paterculus, he was prosecuted by both censors, Gnaeus Servilius Caepio and Lucius Cassius Longinus Ravilla, for extravagance in the rent of his house, for which he paid six thousand sesterces. Caepio was one of his personal enemies. According to Valerius Maximus, he was also punished for building his holiday home in Alsium too high.

== Oratory ==
Lepidus was a man of education and refined taste. Cicero, who had read his speeches, spoke of him as the greatest orator of his age and says that he was the first who introduced in Latin oratory the smooth and even flow of words which distinguished Greeks. He helped to form the style of Tiberius Gracchus and Gaius Carbo, who were accustomed to listen to him with great care. Cicero mentioned Lepidus and his relatives among the Roman orators who "were little, if at all, inferior to the Greeks." He was, however, very deficient in a knowledge of law and Roman institutions.

Political offices
Preceded by Publius Cornelius Scipio Nasica Serapio; Decimus Junius Brutus Callaicus	Roman consul 137 BC with Gaius Hostilius Mancinus	Succeeded by Lucius Furius Philus; Sextus Atilius Serranus
