= Publius Cornelius Scipio Nasica Serapio =

Roman politician, who murdered Tiberius Gracchus

Publius Cornelius Scipio Nasica Serapio (182 or 181 – 132 BC) was a Roman politician. He is most well known for mobilising the mob which killed Tiberius Gracchus, who was at the time attempting to stand for re-election as plebeian tribune in 133 BC. He was consul in 138 BC and served as pontifex maximus, from possibly 141 through to his death in 132 BC.

== Career ==
Nasica's first known public office was that of military tribune, which T.R.S. Broughton provisionally dated to 149 BC in Magistrates of the Roman Republic. If he held that office, he would have been an officer during the Third Punic War and the siege of Carthage. Alexander Yakobson, writing in the Encyclopedia of Ancient History, tentatively identifies this Scipio with the one who committed a gaffe when, during a canvass for the aedileship, he asked whether a farmer with rough hands had a habit of walking on his hands.

Nasica had become praetor by 141 BC, and may have been the Cornelius who in that year was defeated by the Scordisci. Around that year, his father died and he was elected to a pontificate in his place. He may have become pontifex maximus in that year, but the specifics of when he was elected to that post are unclear.

His next magistracy was the consulate of 138 BC. During his year, he and his co-consul – Decimus Junius Brutus Callaicus – were charged with investigation into murders. The colleagues also were imprisoned by a plebeian tribune that year due to their refusal to exempt certain persons from the levy.

== Killing of Tiberius Gracchus ==
In 133 BC, Tiberius Gracchus – his first cousin – was tribune of plebs. Nasica clashed with Tiberius over his agrarian reform bill, which would have redistributed public land (much of which was already occupied) to poor Roman households. After Tiberius secured passage of the reforms with the unprecedented gambit of deposing one of his sacrosanct tribunician colleagues, it was Nasica in the Senate who apparently proposed and carried funding the commission with a nugatory grant.

During the elections of that year, Tiberius attempted – in a serious breach of republican norms – to secure consecutive re-election as tribune, "which suggested an unrepublican attempt to seize power", especially when in the context of Tiberius' actions that year which "represented clear contraventions of accepted rules". A meeting of the Senate was called near the electoral comitia, which Nasica attended. Claiming that one of Tiberius' gestures indicated a request for a diadem, Nasica urged the presiding consul – Publius Mucius Scaevola – to defend the republic and kill the tyrant. After Scaevola refused, Nasica incited a mob of senators – with the phrase "anyone who wants the community secure, follow me", traditional for calling a levy of troops, – and marched on the comitia, putting the hem of his toga upon his head, customary during religious sacrifice. This was an attempt to re-enact "an ancient religious ritual killing... presumably on the grounds that [Tiberius] was trying to seize power and overthrow the existing republic". Joined by one of the other tribunes and a large number of senators, the mob dispersed the comitia. Tiberius was killed, supposedly by one of his fellow tribunes.

In the aftermath of the violence, Nasica was challenged in a legal wager to defend his actions. While the consul Scaevola – a renowned jurist – was proposed as judge, Nasica refused to accept the wager. Shortly thereafter, even though he was pontifex maximus and probably to remove him from the city amid opprobrium, he was sent on an embassy to Pergamum, where he died.

== Family and personal life ==
Nasica belonged to a patrician branch of the gens Cornelia. He was the son of Publius Cornelius Scipio Nasica Corculum, who had served twice as consul (in 162 and 155 BC), as censor in 159 BC, and as pontifex maximus since 150 BC. His grandfather was the Publius Cornelius Scipio Nasica who had been consul in 191 BC.

This Nasica was the father of a largely homonymous son who later achieved the consulship in 111 BC. He was also the great-grandfather of Quintus Caecilius Metellus Pius Scipio, the consul of 52 BC.

Political offices
Preceded by Gn. Calpurnius Piso; M. Popillius Laenas	Roman consul 138 BC; With: D. Junius Brutus Callaicus	Succeeded by M. Aemilius Lepidus Porcina; G. Hostilius Mancinus
Religious titles
Preceded by Scipio Nasica Corculum	Pontifex maximus 141–132 BC	Succeeded by Crassus Dives Mucianus
