= Artur Moreira =

Portuguese footballer (born 1984)

Artur
Personal information
- Full name: Artur Filipe Bernardes Moreira
- Date of birth: 18 February 1984 (age 42)
- Place of birth: Cacia, Portugal
- Height: 1.75 m (5 ft 9 in)
- Position: Attacking midfielder

Youth career
- 1993–1998: Taboeira
- 1998–1999: Académica
- 1999–2000: Taboeira
- 2000–2003: Beira-Mar

Senior career*
Years	Team	Apps	(Gls)
2003–2012	Beira-Mar	154	(19)
2004	→ Gafanha (loan)		
2007	→ Avanca (loan)	13	(1)
2012–2014	Chornomorets	5	(0)
2013–2014	→ Marítimo (loan)	43	(3)
2014–2017	Arouca	83	(1)
2017–2020	Beira-Mar	78	(21)
2020–2021	Santa Cruz Alvarenga	6	(0)
2021–2023	Beira-Mar	49	(8)
Total		431	(53)
- * Club domestic league appearances and goals

Artur Filipe Bernardes Moreira (born 18 February 1984), known simply as Artur, is a Portuguese former footballer who played as an attacking midfielder.

He amassed Primeira Liga totals of 187 matches and 13 goals over nine seasons, at the service of Beira-Mar, Marítimo and Arouca. He also played professionally in Ukraine, with Chornomorets.

== Club career ==
Born in Cacia, Aveiro, Artur joined S.C. Beira-Mar as a 16-year-old. He made his Primeira Liga debut with the local club on 12 December 2004 in a 1–3 home loss against Moreirense F.C. where he came on as a late substitute, one of just three appearances during the relegation-ending season.

In the 2009–10 campaign, Artur scored eight goals to help the team return to the top division as champions under Leonardo Jardim. The following two, he totalled a further nine.

On 1 January 2013, following a very brief spell in the Ukrainian Premier League with FC Chornomorets Odesa, Artur was loaned to C.S. Marítimo of the Portuguese top tier. On 9 June 2014, he signed a permanent two-year contract at F.C. Arouca of the same league, scoring his only goal for the latter side on 2 April 2016 in a 3–2 home victory over Académica de Coimbra.

Artur returned to Beira-Mar aged 33, with the club now in the regional championships.
