= Tiago Barros =

Portuguese footballer

Personal information
- Full name: Tiago André Sá Barros
- Date of birth: 2 April 1988 (age 38)
- Place of birth: Cacia, Portugal
- Height: 1.85 m (6 ft 1 in)
- Position: Midfielder

Team information
- Current team: Moncarapachense
- Number: 25

Youth career
- 1995–1996: Estrela Azul
- 1997–2003: Taboeira
- 2003–2007: Beira-Mar

Senior career*
Years	Team	Apps	(Gls)
2007–2012	Beira-Mar	3	(0)
2007–2008	→ Avanca (loan)	20	(2)
2008–2009	→ Vila Meã (loan)	30	(3)
2009–2010	→ Lourosa (loan)	27	(3)
2012	→ Tondela (loan)	12	(2)
2012–2015	Tondela	84	(11)
2015–2016	Penafiel	39	(1)
2016–2019	Olhanense	69	(9)
2019–	Moncarapachense	17	(2)
- * Club domestic league appearances and goals as of 8 February 2020

Tiago André Sá Barros (born 2 April 1988 in Cacia, Aveiro) is a Portuguese footballer who plays for Lusitano Ginásio Clube Moncarapachense as a midfielder.

== Honours ==
=== Club ===
Tondela

- Segunda Liga: 2014–15
