= Sarah Bond =

Sarah Bond may refer to:

- Sarah Bond (historian), American historian
- Sarah Bond (executive), American business executive and former president of Xbox at Microsoft
- Sarah Bond Hanley, née Bond, American politician, member of the Illinois House of Representatives
