= Sarah Bond (historian) =

American classicist

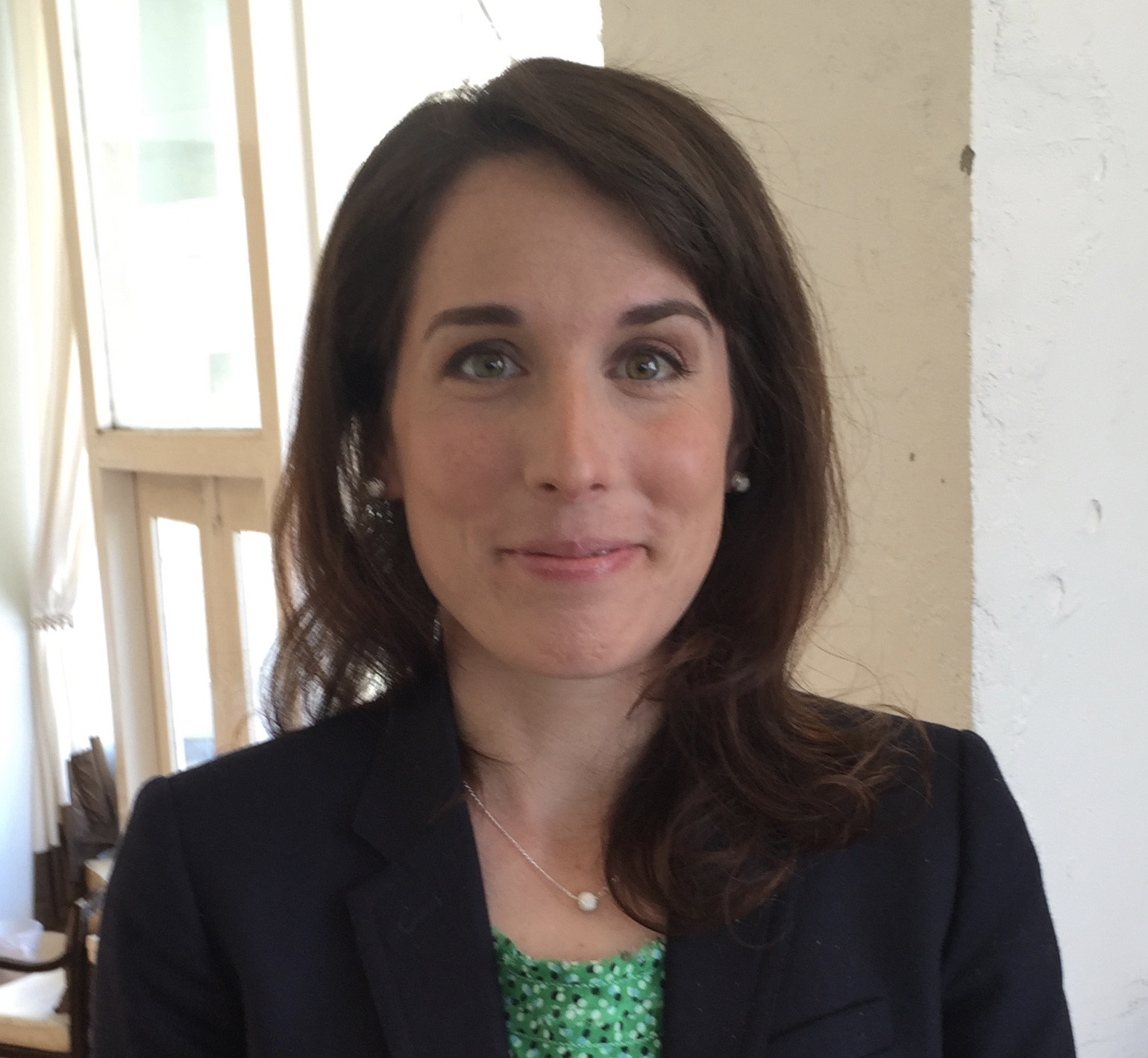
- Occupation: academic

Academic background
- Education: University of North Carolina at Chapel Hill (PhD)
- Thesis: Criers, Impresarios, and Sextons: Disreputable Occupations in the Roman World (2011)

Sarah Emily Bond is an American historian. She is the Erling B. "Jack" Holtsmark Associate Professor of History at the University of Iowa. Her research focuses on late Roman history, epigraphy, law, topography, GIS, and digital humanities.

== Education ==
Bond received her Ph.D. in history from the University of North Carolina at Chapel Hill in 2011. Her doctoral thesis was titled, Criers, Impresarios, and Sextons: Disreputable Occupations in the Roman World. Her PhD was supervised by Professor Richard Talbert. Bond received a master's degree from the University of North Carolina, Chapel Hill, in 2007. She was awarded a BA in Classics and History from the University of Virginia in 2005.

== Career ==
Bond is the author of numerous articles on tradesmen and law in the later Roman empire, and her first monograph, entitled Trade and Taboo: Disreputable Professionals in the Roman Mediterranean, was published in 2016 by University of Michigan Press. A review found it to have made a "significant advance in our understanding of attitudes and reality throughout antiquity."

Bond was appointed assistant professor of classics at the University of Iowa in 2014, after holding an assistant professorship in Ancient and Early Medieval History at Marquette University from 2012. She is chair of the Society for Classical Studies communication committee, associate editor for the Digital Humanities' Pleiades Project and co-Principal Investigator for the Big Ancient Mediterranean Project. She is also a member of the executive committee for the American Society of Greek and Latin Epigraphy for the period 2018–2021. As of July 2019, Bond is no longer part of the University of Iowa Classics Department, and has taken up appointment as an associate professor with the history department.

Bond is a strong advocate for academic public scholarship and sustains a high level of visibility on social media. She has more than 25,000 followers on Twitter, and maintains her blog, History From Below. She is the editor-in-chief of the Blog for the Society for Classical Studies. She is a regular contributor to Hyperallergic.com, and she has written for Forbes, The New York Times, and The Chronicle of Higher Education, and the online Classics journal Eidolon. Bond created the website Women of Ancient History (WOAH), a crowd-sourced digital map and catalog of women who specialize in classical and biblical history. In April 2019 she appeared on a segment on Full Frontal with Samantha Bee talking about polychromy on ancient statues.

== Awards ==
In 2019 she won the Society for Classical Studies' Outreach Prize for Individuals. In her commendation, the SCS praised her expertise on 'an impressive array of subjects with the varied goals of inspiring curiosity and self-reflection...the work Prof. Bond does is highly intelligent—true public scholarship—and a tribute to our discipline.'

== Bibliography ==
=== Monographs and edited volumes ===
- Strike. Labor, Unions, and Resistance in the Roman Empire (Yale University Press, forthcoming 2025)
- Trade and Taboo: Disreputable Professionals in the Roman Mediterranean (Ann Arbor: University of Michigan Press, 2016)

=== Articles and book chapters ===
- “The State, Governance, and Regulation in Ancient Shopping,” A Cultural History of Shopping: Antiquity, edited by Ray Laurence and Mary Harlow (London: Bloomsbury, 2022) 177-94.
- 'This is Not Sparta. Why the Modern Romance with Sparta is a Bad One', Eidolon (May 2018)
- 'Pseudoarchaeology and the Racism Behind Ancient Aliens', Hyperallergic.com (November 2018)
- 'Work and Society from the Principate to Late Antiquity: 44 BCE-565 CE', A Cultural History of Work in Antiquity: Volume I: The Ancient World, 500 BC-800 AD, edited by Ephraim Lytle (London: Bloomsbury Press, 2018)
- 'The Corrupting Sea: Law, Violence, and Compulsory Professions in Late Antiquity', A History of Anticorruption: From Antiquity to the Modern Era, ed. by Ronald Kroeze, André Vitória and Guy Geltner (Oxford University Press, 2018), 49-64
- (with T. H. M. Gellar-Goad) 'Foul and Fair Bodies, Minds, and Poetry in Roman Satire', Disability in Antiquity, ed. by Christian Laes (London: Routledge, 2017)
- 'Dear Scholars, Delete Your Account At Academia.Edu', Forbes (January 2017)
- 'Whitewashing Ancient Statues: Whiteness, Racism And Color In The Ancient World', Forbes (April 2017)
- 'Why We Need to Start Seeing the Classical World in Color', Hyperallergic (June 2017) https://hyperallergic.com/383776/why-we-need-to-start-seeing-the-classical-world-in-color/
- 'What 'Game Of Thrones' Gets Right And Wrong About Eunuchs And Masculinity', Forbes (August 2017)
- 'Currency and Control: Mint Workers in the Later Roman Empire', Work, Labor and Professions in the Roman World, edited by Koen Verboven and Christian Laes (Leiden: Brill, 2016) 227-245
- (with Peter Martens) 'Review article of A. Di Berardino et al., Historical Atlas of Ancient Christianity', Journal of Early Christian Studies 24.4 (Winter, 2016), 601-607
- 'Curial Communiqué: Memory, Propaganda, and the Roman Senate House', Aspects of Ancient Institutions and Geography: Studies in Honor of Richard J.A. Talbert, ed.by Lee L. Brice and Daniëlle Slootjes (Leiden: Brill, 2015)
- '‘As Trainers for the Healthy’: Physical Therapists, Anointers, and Healing in the Late Latin West', Journal of Late Antiquity 8.2 (Fall, 2015), 386-404
- 'Altering Infamy: Status, Violence, and Civic Exclusion in Late Antiquity', Classical Antiquity 33.1 (April, 2014), 1-30
- 'Mortuary Workers, the Church, and the Funeral Trade in Late Antiquity', Journal of Late Antiquity 6.1 (Spring, 2013), 135-151
