= Angeja =

Civil parish in Portugal

- Civil parish
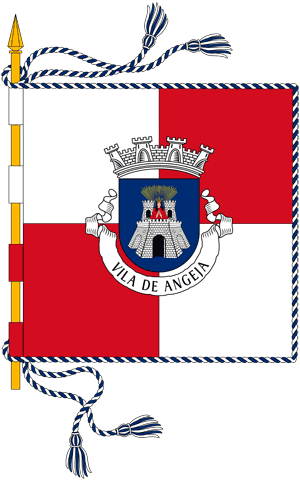
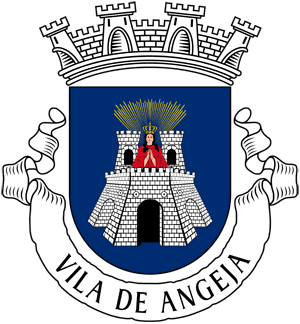
- Flag Coat of arms

- Location in Portugal
- Coordinates: 40.680°N 8.557°W
- Country: Portugal
- Region: Centro
- Intermunic. comm.: Região de Aveiro
- District: Aveiro
- Municipality: Albergaria-a-Velha

Area
  - Total: 21.25 km^{2} (8.20 sq mi)
- Elevation: 23 m (75 ft)

Population (2011)
  - Total: 2,073
  - Density: 98/km^{2} (250/sq mi)
- Time zone: UTC+00:00 (WET)
  - Summer (DST): UTC+01:00 (WEST)
- Postal code: 3850
- Area code: 234
- Patron: Nossa Senhora das Neves
- Website: http://www.jf-angeja.pt/

Angeja is a civil parish in the municipality of Albergaria-a-Velha, in the Portuguese Centro region. In 2011, there were 2073 inhabitants in an area of 21.25 square kilometres (8.20 sq mi).

== History ==
The presence of Greeks and Phoenicians presuppose the Roman occupation in the territory, but it was in 1166 that the first reference Angeja appeared, in the form of ANSEGIA.

Angeja obtained a foral from King D. Manuel I on 15 August 1514, that included the lands of Assequins, Bemposta, Branca, Canelas, Casais de Grijó, Casais do Ribeiro, Contumil, Devesa, Fermelã, Figueiredo, Fonte Chã, Pinheiro, Salreu and Santiães. Initially, this territory was part of the Terras de Santa Maria (Lands of Santa Maria), commonly known as Terras da Feira (Lands of the Fair), which were incorporated into coat-of-arms. By 1853 Angeja was the municipal seat, but this lasted until the end of the year, when the municipality became extinct and integrated into the much larger municipality of Albergaria-a-Velha.

The old town of Angeja and parish of Nossa Senhora das Neves was a curia of the vicarage of São Miguel de Fermelã, later rectory and priory. The marquesses of Angeja, who never lived in the parish, had a procurator that received the land rents.

During the Napoleonic Wars the French razed many of the homes in the parish, which were followed by national revolts during the Restoration and Liberal Wars. During the Liberal Constitution, the reorganization of the civil government and administration had resulted in annexation of several other parishes: Canelas, Fermelã and Frossos. In 1849 its population had surpassed 5124 inhabitants

After this period of political instability, the small parish was elevated to the status of municipality in 1853, before its administrative charter was extinguish and re-integrated (along with Frossos) into the municipality of Albergaria-a-Velha.

On 20 June 1991, following pressure from the local population and a petition motivated in the Assembly of the Republic, Angeja was elevated to the status of vila (comparable to a town).

== Geography ==
Located 8 kilometres (5.0 mi) from the municipal seat, Angeja is also 10 kilometres (6.2 mi) from the district capital, Aveiro. It is bounded in the north by the parish of Fermelâ, the municipalities of Estarreja and Murtosa, to the west by the parish of Cacia in the municipality of Aveiro, the east by the parish of Albergaria-a-Velha, and to the south the parish of Frossos. The narrow administrative boundary crosses diagonally from northwest to southeast on the eastern border of Albergaria-a-Velha, following portions of the Vouga River (southwest) and Aveiro River (northwest). The communities of Angeja and Fontão occupy the southeast corner of the parish, with smaller settlement of Fontão nestled within a river valley closer to the parish border with Albergaria-a-Velha.

== Economy ==
The parish follows the Vouga River valley, its residents concentrated along the margins and occupied with agriculture. The waters of the Vouga also allows the existence of an active fishing industry, especially after industrial effluentes were redirected, that includes species of threadfin, carp, eel, ray-fins and lampreys.

== Architecture ==
=== Civic ===
- Casa Velha; the residential home was constructed in the second-half of the 18th century, and was listed for classification starting on 5 May 2016 (395/2016, Diário da República, Série 2, 87), obtaining the status of Monumento de Interesse Municipal (Monument of Municipal Interest) on 18 August 2017 (Edital 592/2017, Diário da República, Série 2, 159/2017);
- Primary School of Angeja (Portuguese: Escola Primária de Angeja/Centro Escolar de Angeja)
- Pillory of Angeja (Portuguese: Pelourinho de Angeja)
- Bridge of Angeja (Portuguese: Ponte de Angeja)

=== Religious ===
- Church of Nossa Senhora das Neves (Portuguese: Igreja Paroquial de Angeja/Igreja de Nossa Senhora das Neves)
