= Turduli Oppidani =

Pre-Roman tribe of Lusitania

Main language areas in Iberia c. 300 BC

Turduli Oppidani fortified towns on a map of modern Portugal

The Turduli Oppidani or Turdulorum Oppida (Latin: "oppidums of the Turduli" or "Strongholds of the Turduli"), were a pre-Roman coastal people in present-day Portugal, related to the Turduli Veteres and akin to the Callaeci-Lusitanians.

== Location ==
They occupied the Portuguese region of Estremadura-Beira Litoral Province (coastal central Portugal), where they held the fortified towns (Oppida) of Aeminium (Coimbra), Conimbriga (Condeixa-a-Velha, near Coimbra), Coniumbriga (possibly Monte Meão), Collipo (São Sebastião do Freixo, Batalha), Eburobrittium (Amoreira, Óbidos), and Ierabriga (Alenquer).

== History ==
An off-shot of the Turduli people, the Turduli Oppidani trekked northwards around the 5th century BC in conjunction with the Celtici and ended settling the present-day central coastal Portuguese Estremadura-Beira Litoral Province.

The Oppidani seem to have become clients of the Lusitani sometime prior to the mid-3rd Century BC and then of Carthage at the latter part of the century. Their history after the Second Punic War is less clear; is it almost certain that the Oppidani remained under Lusitani overlordship and bore the brunt of the first Roman thrusts into the Iberian northwest. In 138-136 BC Consul Decimus Junius Brutus devastated their lands in retaliation for them helping the Lusitani.

The Oppidani were certainly defeated and technically included in Hispania Ulterior province by the Praetor Publius Licinius Crassus in the wake of his campaign against the Lusitani and Celtici in 93 BC. Again the Turduli Oppidani and the Turduli Veteres suffered the same treatment in 61-60 BC, when they were incorporated into H. Ulterior by the Propraetor Julius Caesar.

=== Romanization ===
They were later aggregated by Emperor Augustus into the new Lusitania Province in 27-13 BC.

== See also ==
- Bardili (Turduli)
- Cynetes
- Gallaeci
- Gallaecia
- Pre-Roman peoples of the Iberian Peninsula
- Turduli
- Turduli Veteres
