= Silvino Vidal =

Silvino Vidal (Albergaria-a-Velha, Portugal, March 21, 1850-Pelotas, Brazil, August 9, 1937) was a Portuguese-Brazilian writer.

After his mother's death, he moved to Porto Alegre with his sister and their father, where he published his first poem in a local newspaper "Álbum Semanal".

He wrote for several publications such as "Álbum Semanal", "O Mosquito", "Diabrete", "Eco do Sul" and "Diário de Rio Grande", and he was a member of "Partenon Literário"

== Books ==
- Margaridas (1880)
- Aquarelas (1885)

== Sources ==
- FERREIRA, Delfim Bismarck. Casa e Capela de Santo António (1999)
- VAZ, Artur Emilio Alarcon. A lírica de imigrantes portugueses no Brasil meridional. v. 2
- FERREIRA, Delfim Bismarck. artigo Jornal de Albergaria, 14/04/2009
