= Durius =

Durius or Durio was a god worshiped by the ancient Lusitanians and Celtiberians of the Iberian Peninsula. He was a personification of what is today known as the river Douro and is usually depicted holding a fishing net. A shrine dedicated to him was known to exist in the vicinity of Porto in Roman times.
