= Decimus Junius Brutus Callaicus =

Roman senator and general

Decimus Junius Brutus Callaicus (or Gallaecus or Callaecus; c. 180 – 113 BC) was a consul of the Roman Republic for the year 138 BC together with Publius Cornelius Scipio Nasica Serapio. He was an optimate politician and a military commander in Hispania and in Illyria. He was the son of the consul of 178 BC, Marcus Junius Brutus, and father of the Decimus Junius Brutus who was consul in 77 BC, and through him, the grandfather of the Caesarian assassin Decimus Junius Brutus Albinus.

Decimus Junius Brutus belonged to the optimates, a political faction which supported the interests of the aristocracy and was opposed to both the plebeian tribunes (the representatives of the plebs) and populares, a political faction which championed the cause of the poor and wanted reforms to help them. During his consulship he and his colleague P. Cornelius Scipio Nasica opposed the plebeian tribunes. The plebeian tribune Gaius Curiatus sent both consuls to prison because they did not allow the plebeian tribunes to select ten men who would be exempt from military service. The two consuls also opposed a proposal by the tribunes to purchase grain from abroad because the price of grain was going up. Scipio Nasica made a speech which quieted the restless plebs.

== Campaigns in Lusitania and southern Gallaecia ==
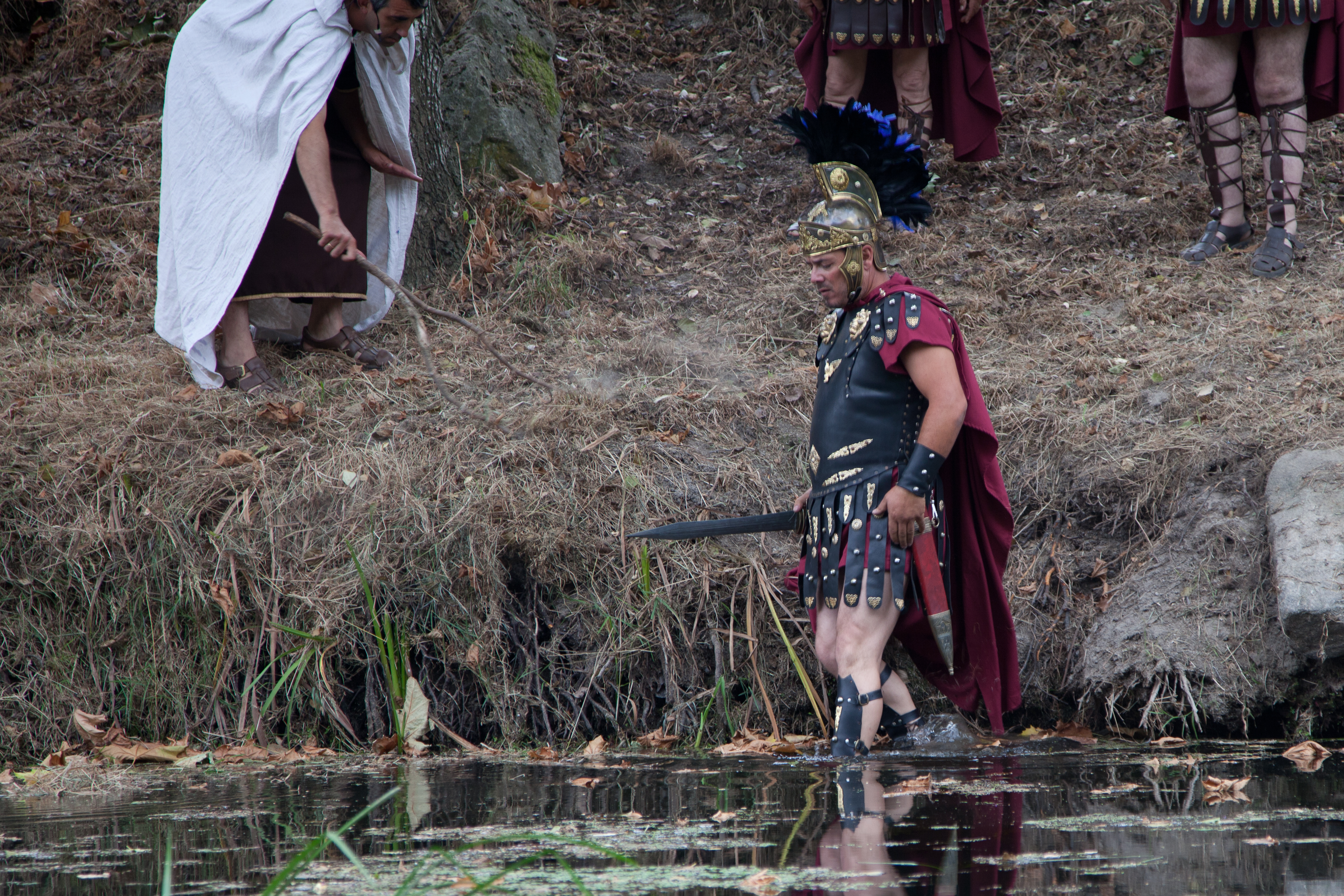
Reenactment of Decimus Junius Brutus crossing the "Lethes" (Limia River today).

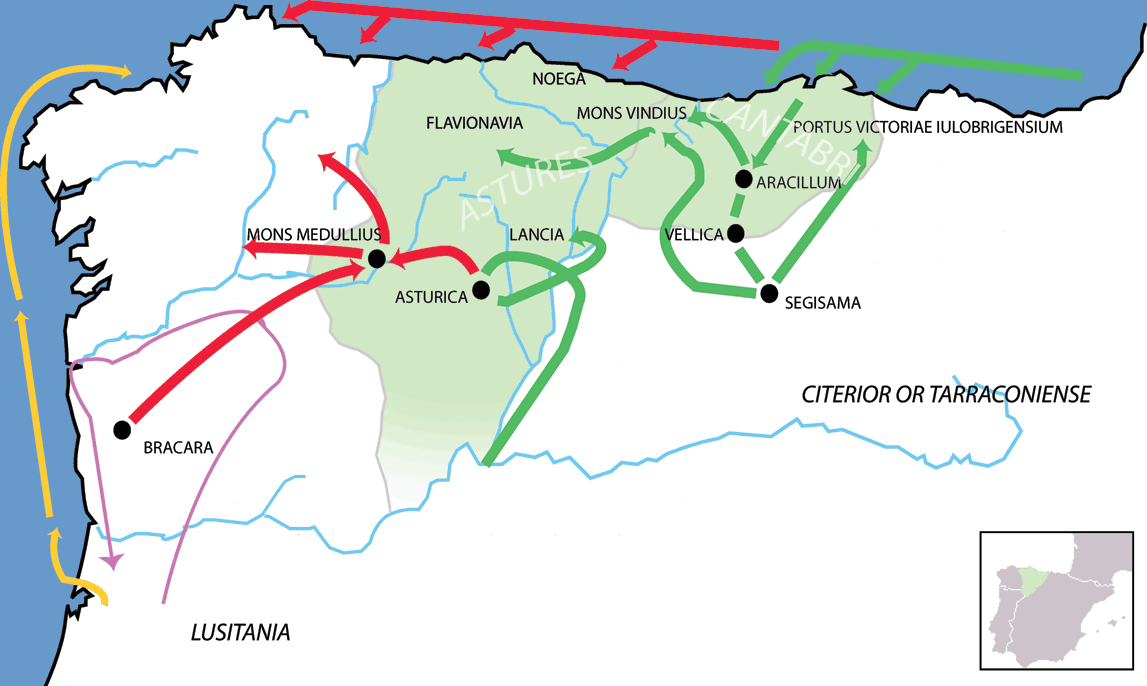
Map of Roman campaigns in the northwest of the Iberian Peninsula. The purple line shows Brutus' campaign (138–136 BC). The yellow line shows Caesar's campaign (62 BC). The green lines and the red lines show the Cantabrian War (29–19 BC).

Iberian Peninsula circa 100 BC

Appian (who wrongly identified Decimus Junius Brutus Callaicus as a praetor called Sextius Junius Brutus) wrote that (in 138 BC) Brutus was sent to the Roman province of Hispania Ulterior (Further Spain, in modern Andalusia in the south) to deal with many guerrilla bands which were raiding Lusitania in emulation of Viriathus, the Lusitanian chieftain who led the Lusitanian War (or Fiery War, 155–139 BC) against the Romans and who had been assassinated the year before. The guerrilla bands raided Lusitania, which was between the Rivers Durius (Douro) and Tagus, lying to the north-west of Hispania Ulterior. It covered central and northern parts of present Portugal and also some territory in current western Spain.

Brutus would have been unable to pursue the gangs over an area which ranged from the Rivers Lethe (Limia) and Durius to the River Baetis (Guadalquivir). This was a vast area which extended from Gallaecia, in modern-day north-western Spain and northern Portugal, to the edge of the Roman province of Hispania Ulterior. Therefore, Brutus attacked their towns for revenge, to destroy their homes and for plunder for his army, obliterating everything in his path. Women fought valiantly with their men. Some people fled to the mountains and, when they asked for pardon, Brutus took their belongings as a fine. In 137 BC Brutus crossed the River Durius and therefore crossed into Gallaecia. Brutus also reached the River Lethe, which flows from a source in Galicia close to today's border with Portugal and has its outlet on the coast of northern Portugal. Appian wrote that he was the first Roman who thought of crossing it. Lethe was also the name of a mythical river in the underworld, and so the superstitious Roman soldiers refused to cross it until Brutus crossed it himself. Brutus also crossed the Nimis (a river which has not been identified, but was probably the Minho in Galicia, the last tract of which forms part of today's northern border of Portugal. He launched an assault against the Bracari, a tribe of southern Gallaecia centred on modern-day Braga, Portugal, because they attacked his baggage train. The fighting women killed themselves and their children when they were captured. A number of towns submitted but then rebelled. One of them was Talabriga. Brutus ordered the inhabitants to hand over the deserters, the prisoners, hostages and their weapons and to leave the town. They disobeyed and he had them surrounded by soldiers to scare them and then took their horses, provisions and public money, but gave them back the town. When he completed his campaign Brutus then returned to Rome.

Brutus must have moved into Lusitania from north of the River Tagus because no crossing of this river was mentioned by Appian. Therefore, he advanced from central Portugal to northern Portugal. He had the city of Olissipo (modern Lisbon) fortified. Talabriga (whose allegedly location could be Marnel, near Águeda, but it could also be Branca according to Portuguese archeologist Félix Alves Pereira) must have been taken before the Crossing of the Durius. A fortified position was established at Vissaium (Viseu). As already noted, after devastating Lusitania Brutus also reached into southern Gallaecia.

Cividade de Terroso in the outskirts of modern Póvoa de Varzim, was one of the major cities in the heartland of the native Castro Culture in coastal northern Portugal, which had notable Carthaginian influence in trade and culture. The archaeological site shows clear signs of complete destruction and burning dating to the time of Decimus Junius Brutus. After the destruction the city was rebuilt using some Roman principles.

Decimus Junius Brutus pacified Lusitania and southern Gallaecia. The way the Roman kept suzerainty over the peoples of this area is unclear due lack of information. It is likely that they were forced to become Roman allies like some of the Celtiberian peoples who lived further east. There were further conflicts between the Romans and the Lusitanians later. Lusitania and Gallaecia were annexed into the Roman Empire later, when Augustus reorganised the Roman provinces of Hispania either before or after the Cantabrian Wars of 29–19 BC (in Asturias and Cantabria, to the north of Gallaecia) in which he suppressed the last rebellion against the Romans in the peninsula. Lusitania was established as a new province. Gallaecia became part of Hispania Tarraconensis, a new and larger province which replaced the province of Hispania Citerior to include central and southern Spain.

== Participation in war against the Vaccaei ==
In 137 BC Decimus Junius Brutus also got involved in a campaign against the Vaccaei, who lived to the west of the Celtiberians and not far from Lusitania. The commanders of the Roman province of Hispania Citerior (Nearer Spain, on the east coast of Spain, roughly corresponding to modern Catalonia and Valencia) were fighting in Numantine War (143–133 BC), a rebellion of the Celtiberians who lived to the west of Hispania Citerior. The war was centred on the town of Numantia, which was difficult to besiege, holding out for ten years. In 137 BC the consul Marcus Aemilius Lepidus Porcina was sent to Hispania Citerior to continue the war after the Roman Senate rejected a peace treaty made by the other consul for the year, Gaius Hostilius Mancinus. Aemilius did not want to keep his army idle while he was waiting for instructions from Rome and was probably greedy for glory and booty. He falsely accused the Vaccaei of aiding the Celtiberians as an excuse for war. He ravaged the countryside and besieged Pallantia, their main city. He convinced Brutus, who was the commander of Hispania Ulterior and his brother-in-law, to join him. Messengers from the senate arrived and asked why Aemilius sought a new war. They warned him not to continue the attacks on the Vaccaei. Aemilius sent them back to Rome and wrote that it would be dangerous to abandon the war. The siege lasted a long time, during which the Romans run short of food and many men and all the animals died. Aemilius and Brutus eventually had to withdraw, doing so in a very disorderly manner. The Pallantines harassed their flanks and rear and killed many men. When Rome heard of this, Aemilius was recalled, stripped of his command and consulship, and fined. Brutus does not seem to have been punished.

== Family ==
Callaicus was married to a Clodia (who had previously been married to Publius Licinius Crassus Dives Mucianus and had three children with him) and with her had at least two children, a son named Decimus Junius Brutus and a daughter named Junia who became the mother of Gaius Claudius Marcellus.

== Other facts ==
The ancient Roman historian Livy wrote that in 138 BC, when Decimus Junius Brutus and his consular colleague, Publius Cornelius Nasica, held the levy of the soldiers, "something happened in front of the recruits that served as an example." A man was accused before the plebeian tribunes of deserting the army in Hispania. He was sentenced, "sent under the yoke, chastised with rods, and sold for one sesterce."

In 138 BC Decimus Junius Brutus founded the Roman colony of "Valentia Edetanorum" (today's Valencia) in Hispania Citerior. Valentia, which means valour, was named in honour of the valour of the Roman soldiers. Edetanorum indicated that the city was in the territory of the Edetani, an Iberian people. It was built on the site of an Iberian town. Livy said that Valentia was founded to give land to soldiers who had fought under Viriathus, the Lusitanian leader.

In 136 BC the Roman Senate granted Brutus a triumph and gave him the agnomen Callaicus or Callaecus (winner against the Callaeci/Gallaeci) At an unknown date he built a temple by the Circus Flaminius which is thought to have been dedicated to Hercules Callaicus. This was one of various public buildings Callaicus built with the proceeds of the spoils of his war. All of them had inscriptions by Lucius Accius, the tragic poet. He had a colossal statue of a seated Mars erected in this temple.

Brutus was the patron of Lucius Accius, who wrote a tragedy on the tyranny of Lucius Tarquinius Superbus, the last king of Rome, and his expulsion by Lucius Junius Brutus (the founder of the Roman Republic and an ancestor of Callaecus) titled Brutus in honour of his patron.

In 129 BC, according to Livy, Brutus helped the consul Gaius Sempronius Tuditanus, who "at first fought unsuccessfully against the Iapydians [a tribe in Illyria], but the defeat was compensated by a victory won through the qualities of Decimus Junius Brutus." However, according to Appian, "Sempronius Tuditanus and Tiberius Pandusa waged war with the Iapydes, who live among the Alps, and seem to have subjugated them." This was the last historical record of Callaicus.

Cicero said that Callaicus had the peculiar habit of performing the libations (the pouring of a liquid as an offering to a god or spirit or in memory of the dead) for the dead in December instead of February as was customary. Plutarch explored a number of possible explanations for this peculiarity: (1) since the dead were honoured at the end of the day, it may be reasonable to do so at the end of the year; (2) it might not be fitting to honour the dead at the beginning of the sowing, a time of new life; (3) December was dedicated to Saturn, who was a god of the underworld; or, (4) that "Brutus deemed it proper to bestow upon the dead first-fruits" of the revelries of the festival of the Saturnalia. Plutarch also wondered whether "this statement, that Brutus alone sacrificed to the dead in this month" was wrong. "For it is in December that they make offerings to Larentia and bring libations to her sepulchre." Larentia was a mythical woman who was connected to the Lares, the spirits of ancestors who were guardian deities of the family, neighbourhoods, roadways, seaways, agriculture, livestock, towns, cities, and the state.

According to Mastrocinque, in 122 BC Callaicus took part in the suppression of the movement led by Gaius Sempronius Gracchus.

== See also ==
- Junia gens
- Lusitanians
- Quintus Sertorius
- Viriathus
- Timeline of Portuguese history

== Notes ==
Political offices
Preceded by Gn. Calpurnius Piso; M. Popillius Laenas	Roman consul 138 BC; With: P. Cornelius Scipio Nasica Serapio	Succeeded by M. Aemilius Lepidus Porcina; Gaius Hostilius Mancinus
