= Alquerubim =

Civil parish in Portugal

- Civil parish
- Location in Portugal
- Coordinates: 40.622778°N 8.509167°W
- Country: Portugal
- Region: Centro
- District: Aveiro
- Municipality: Albergaria-a-Velha

Area
  - Total: 15.36 km^{2} (5.93 sq mi)

Population (2011)
  - Total: 2,381
  - Density: 155.0/km^{2} (401.5/sq mi)
- Time zone: UTC+00:00 (WET)
  - Summer (DST): UTC+01:00 (WEST)
- Website: jf-alquerubim.pt

Alquerubim is a civil parish in the municipality of Albergaria-a-Velha, Portugal. The population in 2011 was 2,381.
