= Cacia =

Civil parish in Portugal

- Civil parish
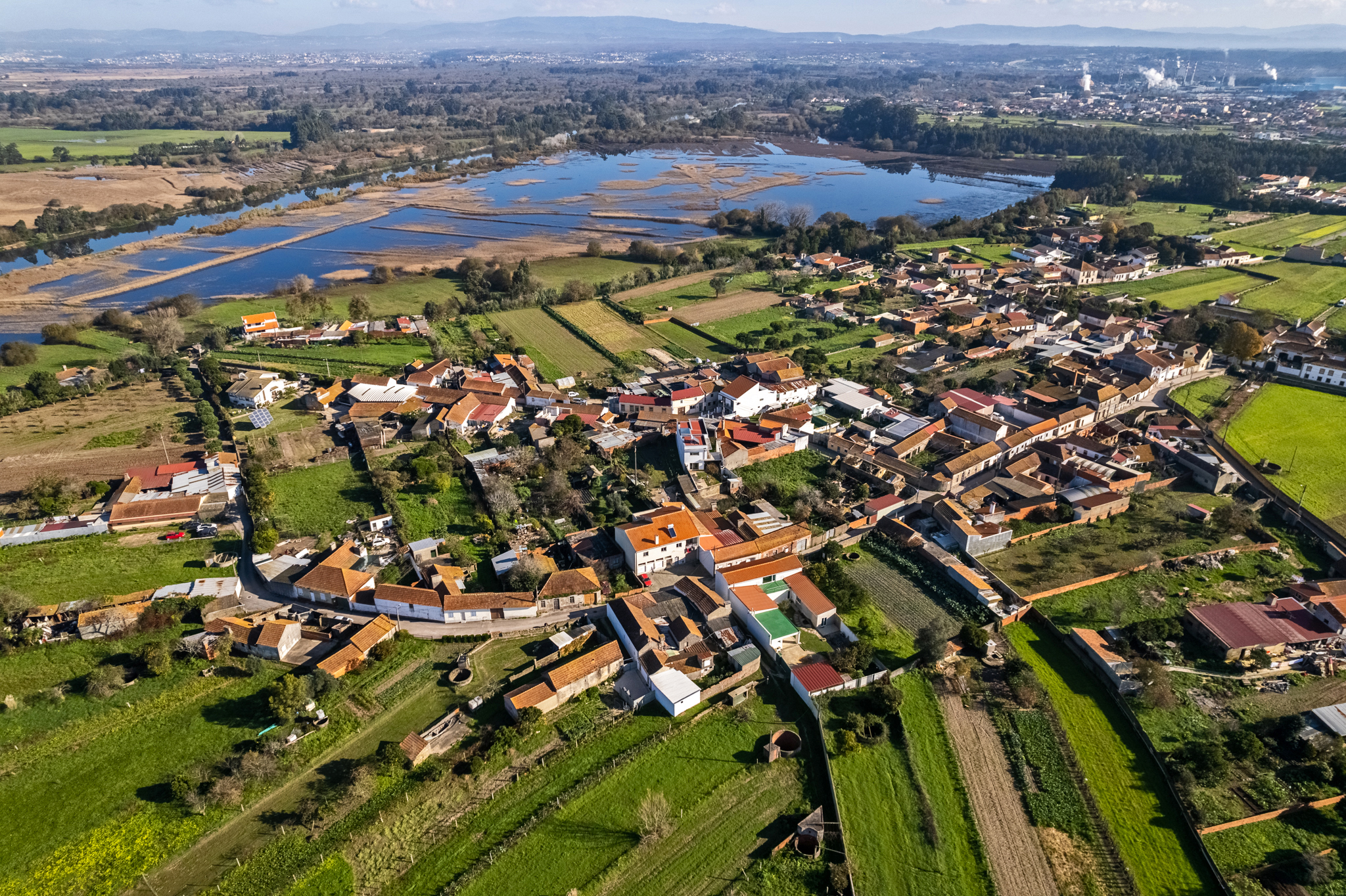
- Aerial view of Cacia

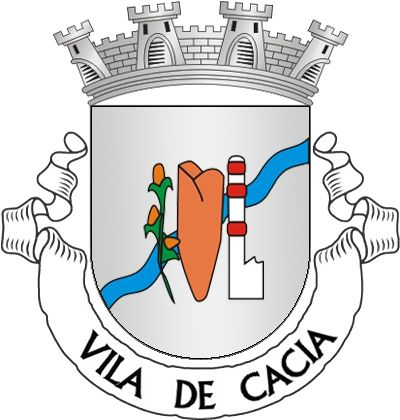
- Coat of arms

- Location in Portugal
- Coordinates: 40.690°N 8.625°W
- Country: Portugal
- Region: Centro
- Intermunic. comm.: Região de Aveiro
- District: Aveiro
- Municipality: Aveiro

Area
  - Total: 35.75 km^{2} (13.80 sq mi)
- Elevation: 9 m (30 ft)

Population (2011)
  - Total: 7,354
  - Density: 205.7/km^{2} (532.8/sq mi)
- Time zone: UTC+00:00 (WET)
  - Summer (DST): UTC+01:00 (WEST)
- Postal code: 3800
- Area code: 234
- Patron: São Julião
- Website: http://www.cacia.pt/

Cacia is a civil parish in the municipality of Aveiro. The population in 2011 was 7,354, in an area of 35.75 km^{2} (13.80 sq mi).

== History ==
There are no clear indications of the first peoples to inhabit the region; João Gaspar suggests that they could have been people from the lands of Além-Coa, who migrated into the region some 3000 years B.C. after the lakes of the Iberian plateau dried up. Later, Phoenicians and Greeks established themselves in the Vouga estuary, motivated by commercial interests and took advantage of the local region to produce salt. The Celts expanded into southern Europe (at the end of the 5th–6th century) occupying the central Meseta around Castela-a-Nova and coast of Portugal north of the Tagus until Galicia (avoiding pre-existing tribes). Roman references to the Celts of the Vouga and Mondego suggest that they were the Turduli, and with the Celts along the Guadiana River, travelled to the northern part of the peninsula and dispersed along the Atlantic coast until Galicia. In addition to salt production, the peoples of the Vouga estuary (Vacca as it was called) concentrated on fishing, salting fish and agriculture (such as the raising of pigs and cattle). There is also evidence that the locals extracted millions of tonnes of limestone and granite that were used local and other public works.

The Roman occupation of the region also brought with it the export of minerals, such as copper and iron, from the mines in the interior around Albergaria-a-Velha and Sever do Vouga. A few authors (Gaspar Barreiros, 1561; and Duart Nunes do Leão, 1610) defend that Cacia was Oppidum Talabriga, referred to by Pliny the Elder. Although the hypothesis was never proven, Alberto Souto (on visiting the ruins of Torre in 1929) guaranteed that in Cacia there existed a settlement (possibly Luso-Roman) which had an important role in maritime and fluvial commerce along the margins of the Vouga. The Celto-Roman settlement was abandoned before and during the invasion of Germanic tribes (Visigoths) into the Iberian Peninsula. Survivors abandoned the region and began to settle in the pasturelands of the interior. The rising in water levels may have also had an influence on this desertification, destroying the river community and causing the collapse of the salting industry. The Church appropriated the historical zone of the Celto-Roman settlement, erecting a stone church, while the fishermen expropriated Sarrazola (or Terra dos Salgueiros, known as the lands of the salters) to shelter their fishing community. Consequently, the new settlement of Cacia was established south of the primitive colony, while smaller agglomerations began to grow in the vicinity: to the south, Quintã do Loureiro, and farther to the west of Sarrazola, the villages of Vilarinho and Póvoa (along the sea).

The appearance of local names, such as Atalaia and Alvariça, reveal the passage of Moors into the region, which left other cultural marks in the region.

Meanwhile, after the 10th century, a natural phenomenon occurred that caused the establishment of a natural beach that formed from Espinho and slowly expanded until Cabo Mondego. This pushed the western coast farther into the sea, and distancing Cacia from the sea.

=== Middle Ages ===
During the Christian Reconquista, Afonso Henriques and Teresa, donated almost half of the village of Cacia to the Monastery of Larvão on 25 August 1106.

The Padroado of the parish was the Abbess Larvão, who was responsible for conferring episcopal authority. However, the records from the command of the Order of Christ found that land rents from this church during the 16th century diminished considerably. In March 1590, Commander António de Melo da Silva, master of the local lands and properties, claimed two-halves of the tithe, a practice that extended almost a hundred years during the Padroado of Larvão. The parochial church was dedicated to the martyr São Julião (or Gião), its church reconstructed in the late part of the last century, with limestone sculptures of the Madonna and Child, and the martyrs Saint Sebastian and Saint Catherine.

=== Monarchy ===
In 1775, the parochial tithes in Cacia, which included 458 residents, rented 900$000 réis; but the parish did not receive these land rents, because they two-thirds pertained to the Commander of the Order of Christ, and the last third to the Royal Monastery of Lorvão. The Command was obligated to reconstruct the main chapel and sacristy; pay an annual budget of 10$000 réis for upkeep; the parish priest a stipend of 260$000 réis; and the clergy, who lived at the cost of the priest, a stipend of 10$000 réis. In 1776, in addition to the priest/vicar Father José dos Santos Pires, and adjunct, Father Manuel Duarte, there lived in the parish Fathers Manuel Simões and Manuel Antunes, in minor clergy Manuel Rodrigues, Fernando Dias, Eusébio Rodrigues Teixeira and Manuel Rodrigues da Costa.

It was incorporated into the municipality of Aveiro in 1853, when the municipality of Esgueira (to which it belonged) was extinguished during the administrative reforms. At the time Esgueira included the civil parishes of Cacia, Vilarinho, Sarrazola, Quintã do Loureiro and Póvoa do Paço, and included the marine areas along the margins of the river.

The 19th century brought with it the advancement of the economic and social conditions of the families, while agriculture declined and emigration increased. As new farm estates and quintas were being constructed, the first university trained-generation returned to the community. This included Dr. Manuel Rodrigues Simões (known as the Dr. Vigairinho, the little vicar), who was, although a Miguelista, was a personal friend of José Estêvão; Dr. João Carlos Silveira Temudo, man of letters; o Dr. Manuel Nunes da Silva, referred to as Conselheiro Nunes da Silva, who was a national representative in the Cortes, and judge in the Supreme Court; Father Manuel Marques Rodrigues, who, as President of the local Junta da Paróquia, created a controversy when he redistributed a great number of properties to a few Cacienses.

At the beginning of the 20th century, the youth of the parish (primarily those living in Lisbon) supported the Republican movement. Manuel Nunes Ferreira, who was a comrade of Elias Garcia and Trigueiros de Martel; Dr. Manuel Dias Ferreira, also a founder of the First Republic; Manuel Barreiros de Macedo; Manuel Teixeira Ramalho; João Ferreira and Dr. António Maria Marques da Costa, who were deputies in the Republican Congress of 1911, and who was councilman in the municipal council of Lisbon, were some of the names that marked the community during this period.

In 1919, Cacia was the site of the military Traulitânia. Between 24 and 31 January 1919, the Vouga served as the line dividing monarchist and republican forces: monarchists in Angeja and republicans in Cacia. On 27 January 1919, the monarchists tried to cross the wood bridge between them, and were repelled by the military and civic volunteers, commanded by Captain Zeferino Camossa Ferraz de Abreu. After 31 January, the republicans advanced into the north, attacking Estarreja, the last stronghold of the monarchists in the region, and on 16 February entered Porto.

== Geography ==
The parish of Cacia is situated in the north of the municipality of Aveiro, limited in the north by the Aveiro and Vourga Rivers; west by the parish of Vera Cruz; south by the civil parish of Esgueira; and east by the Vouga River, and parallel the lands of Angeja, in the neighbouring municipality of Albergaria-a-Velha.

== Economy ==
Today, the region of Cacia is an important industrial area in the country, home to C.A. C.I.A. (ex-Renault), Vulcano, Funfrap and Portucel.

== Architecture ==
- Cacia Primary School (Portuguese: Escola Primária de Cacia), a 20th-century building, built after the Estado Novo Plano dos Centenários program, it is a two-floor structure with four twinned rooms, in the style of Beira Litoral (following the school models designed by the Edifícios Nacionais do Norte and remodelled by architect Joaquim Areal);
- Church of São Julião (Portuguese: Igreja Paroquial de Cacia/Igreja de São Julião), the parochial church of Cacia, constructed sometime in the 15th century, and credited for the 150$000 réis altarpiece which created by Antonio Gomes, date to 6 August 1697.
