= Lucius Furius Philus =

Lucius Furius Philus was a Roman statesman who became consul of ancient Rome in 136 BC. He was a member of the Scipionic Circle, and particularly close to Scipio Aemilianus.

As proconsul, his allotted province was Spain. The consul of the previous year, Gaius Hostilius Mancinus, had recently suffered a humiliating defeat at the hands of the Numantines and was forced to surrender, an event known as the foedus Mancinum. As his successor in Spain, it was Furius Philus who handed Mancinus over to the Numantines as recompense for the annulled treaty.

Furius was remembered for deliberately picking two of his personal enemies, a 'Q. Metellus' and a 'Q. Pompeius', as lieutenants for his Spanish command, apparently so that his achievements could be lauded by even those who disliked him. For this, he was remembered either as an admirable model of Roman self-confidence or as an example of Roman rashness.

He is mentioned by Macrobius as the author of a work mentioning two sacral formulae to use against besieged cities, while Cicero, in de Republica, praises the style of Furius' speeches.

Preceded by Marcus Aemilius Lepidus Porcina and Gaius Hostilius Mancinus	Consul of the Roman Republic with Sextus Atilius Serranus; 136 BC	Succeeded by Servius Fulvius Flaccus and Quintus Calpurnius Piso
