= Ribeira de Fráguas =

Civil parish in Portugal

- Civil parish
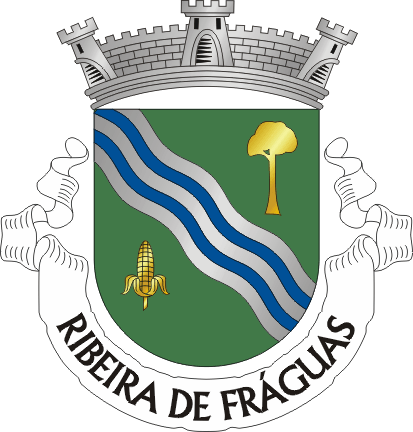
- Coat of arms

- Location in Portugal
- Coordinates: 40°44′23″N 8°26′40″W
- Country: Portugal
- Region: Centro
- Intermunic. comm.: Região de Aveiro
- District: Aveiro
- Municipality: Albergaria-a-Velha

Area
  - Total: 26.75 km^{2} (10.33 sq mi)

Population (2011)
  - Total: 1,713
  - Density: 64/km^{2} (170/sq mi)
- Time zone: UTC+00:00 (WET)
  - Summer (DST): UTC+01:00 (WEST)

Ribeira de Fráguas is a village and a civil parish of the municipality of Albergaria-a-Velha, Portugal. The population in 2011 was 1,713, in an area of 26.75 km^{2}.
