= Lusitanians =

Indo-European people who inhabited Lusitania (modern Portugal)

The Lusitanians were an Indo-European–speaking people living in the far west of the Iberian Peninsula, in present-day central Portugal and the regions of Extremadura and Castilla y León of Spain. It is uncertain whether the Lusitanians were Celts or Celticized Iberians, related to the Lusones. After its conquest by the Romans, the land was subsequently incorporated as a Roman province named after them (Lusitania).

== History ==
=== Origins ===
Ethnographic and linguistic map of the Iberian Peninsula at about 300 BCE (before the Carthaginian conquests)

Regarding their prehistoric roots, recent paleogenomic and archaeological data suggest that the ethnogenesis of the Lusitanians was heavily influenced by a Mediterranean and Aegean-like genetic substrate. During the Late Bronze Age, the western Atlantic facade of Iberia was deeply integrated into maritime trade networks, particularly for the extraction of tin and precious metals. Archaeogenetic modeling demonstrates that the local population maintained strong genetic continuity with Early European Farmers (EEFs) of Aegean/Anatolian origin, further enriched by Bronze Age Eastern Mediterranean gene flow. This genetic profile shares substantial affinities with Mycenaean-period Greek populations, fundamentally distinguishing the Lusitanians from the Central European Iron Age Hallstatt and La Tène Celtic populations, and indicating that their cultural Celticization occurred through diffusion rather than large-scale demic replacement.

Frontinus mentions Lusitanian leader Viriathus as the leader of the Celtiberians, in their war against the Romans. The Lusitanians were also called Belitanians, according to the diviner Artemidorus. Strabo differentiated the Lusitanians from the Iberian tribes and thought of them as being Celtiberians who had been known as Oestriminis in ancient times. However, based on archeological findings, Lusitanians and Vettones seem to have been largely pre-Celtic Indo-European populations that adopted Celtic cultural elements by proximity. On the other hand, Pliny the Elder and Pomponius Mela distinguished the Lusitanians from neighboring Celtic tribes in their geographical writings. The Lusitanians' Celtic root however, is further emphasized in a 2023 research by the Max Planck Institute on the origins of Indo-European languages. One study identified one common Celtic branch of peoples and languages spanning most of Atlantic Europe, including Lusitania, at around 7,000 BC. This work contradicts previous theories that excluded Lusitanian from the Celtic linguistic family.

The original Roman province of Lusitania briefly included the territories of the Astures and Gallaeci in the north, but these were soon ceded to the jurisdiction of the Provincia Tarraconensis, while the south remained the Provincia Lusitania et Vettones. Later, Gallaecia would become its own province. After this, Lusitania's northern border was along the Douro River, while its eastern border passed through Salmantica and Caesarobriga to the Anas (Guadiana) river.

=== Wars with Rome ===
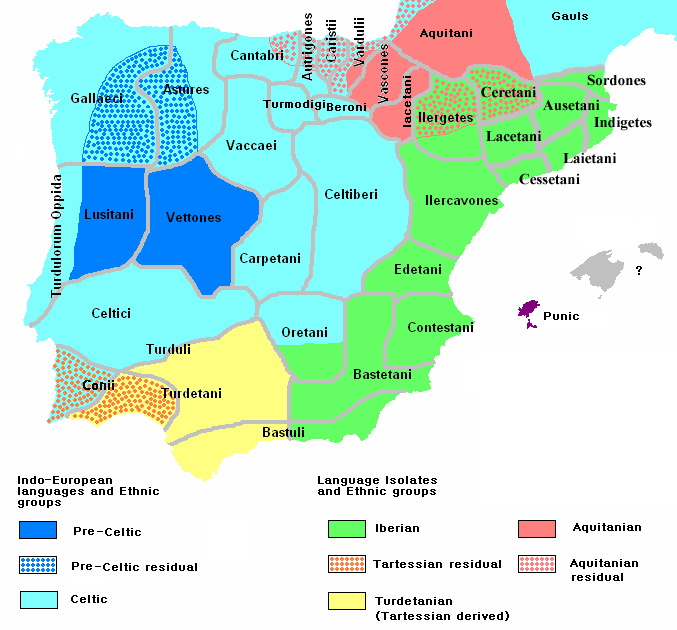
Iberian Peninsula at about 200 BCE

Lusitanian mercenaries fought for the Carthaginian Empire between the years 218 and 201 BCE, during the Second Punic War against the Roman Republic that took place in the Western Mediterranean. Roman senator and orator Silius Italicus describes them in his 17-volumes epic poem Punica as forming a combined force with the Gallaeci and both being led by a commander named Viriathus (not to be confused with the similarly named chieftain). According to Roman historian Titus Livius, Lusitanian and Celtiberian cavalry performed raids in northern Italy whenever the terrain was too rough for the Carthaginian general Hannibal's famed Numidian cavalry.

Starting in 193 BCE, the Lusitanians fought the Romans in Hispania. In 150 BCE, they were defeated by the Roman praetor Servius Galba: springing a treacherous trap, he killed 9,000 Lusitanians and later sold 20,000 more as slaves in Gaul (modern-day France). This massacre would not be forgotten by Viriathus, who three years later (147 BCE) would become the leader of the Lusitanians, and severely damaged the Roman rule in Lusitania and beyond. In 139 BCE, Viriathus was betrayed and killed in his sleep by three of his companions (who had been sent as emissaries to the Romans), Audax, Ditalcus and Minurus, bribed by Marcus Popillius Laenas (although they were warrior companions of Viriathus, they were not Lusitanians themselves; they seem to have been Turdetanians, or from another people who were not Lusitanian). However, when the three returned to receive their reward from the Romans, the consul Quintus Servilius Caepio ordered their execution, declaring: "Rome does not pay traitors".

=== Romanization of Lusitania ===
After the death of Viriathus, the Lusitanians kept fighting under the leadership of Tautalus, but gradually acquired Roman culture and language; the Romanized Lusitanian cities, in a manner similar to those of the rest of the Iberian Peninsula, eventually gained the status of "Citizens of Rome".

== Culture ==
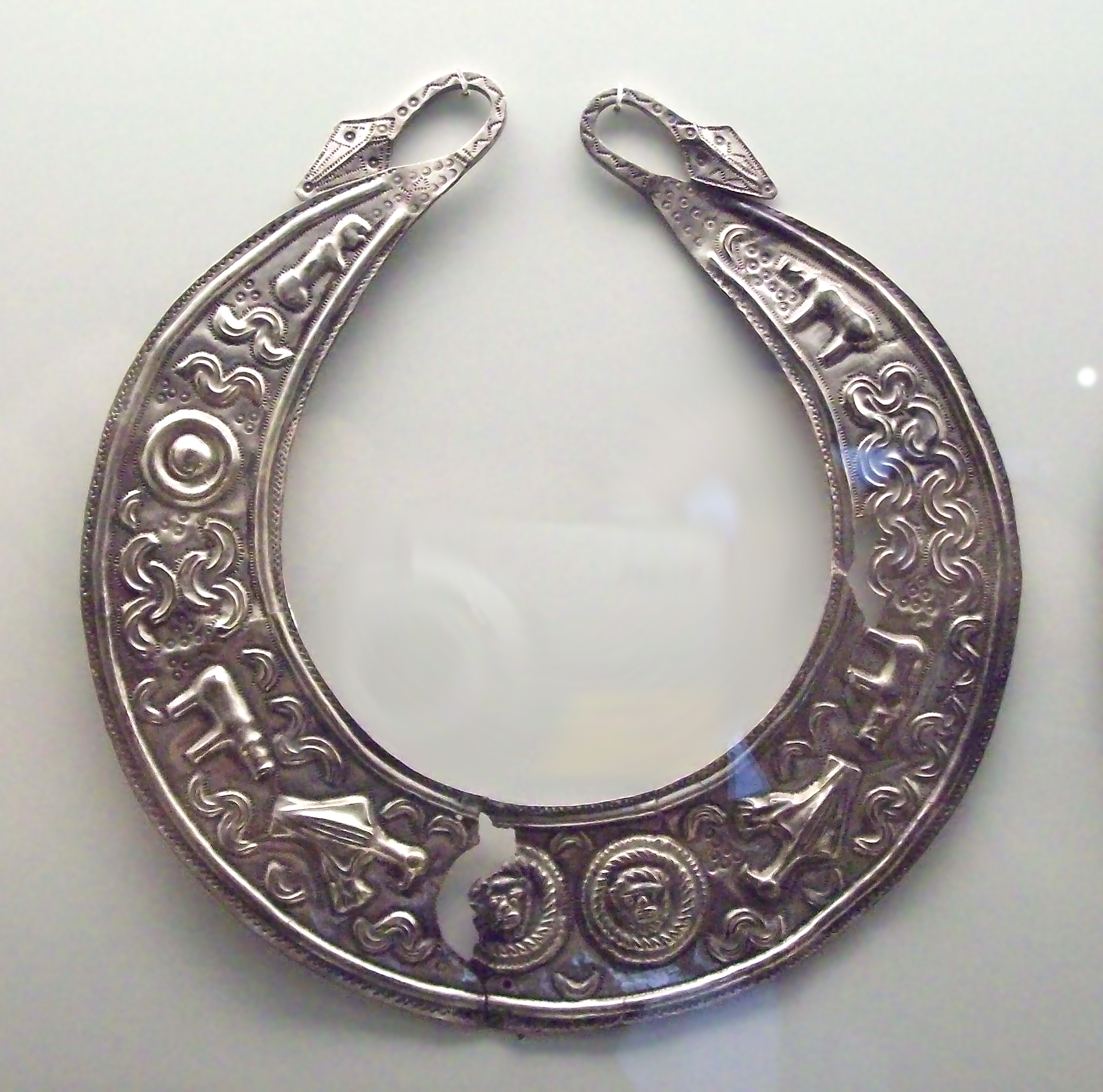
Lusitanian lunula from Miranda do Corvo (Portugal)

Generalised distribution and movements of the Bell Beaker culture

Categorising Lusitanian culture generally, including the language, is proving difficult and contentious. Some believe it was essentially a pre-Celtic Iberian culture with substantial Celtic influences, while others argue that it was an essentially Celtic culture with strong indigenous pre-Celtic influences associated with the Bell Beaker culture.

== Religion ==
The Lusitanians practiced a diverse form polytheism, that included animal sacrifice. Their gods and warriors were also depicted in sculpture.

Endovelicus was the most important god for the Lusitanians. He is considered a possible Basque language loan god by some, yet according to scholars like José Leite de Vasconcelos, the word Endovellicus was originally Celtic, Andevellicos.

Endovelicus is compared with Welsh and Breton names, giving him the meaning of "Very Good God", the same epithet of the Irish god Dagda. Even the Romans worshiped him for his ability to protect. His cult eventually spread across the Iberian peninsula and beyond, to the rest of the Roman Empire and his cult was maintained until the fifth century; he was the god of public health and safety. The goddess Ataegina was especially popular in the south; as the goddess of rebirth (spring), fertility, nature, and cure, she was identified with Proserpina during the Roman era.

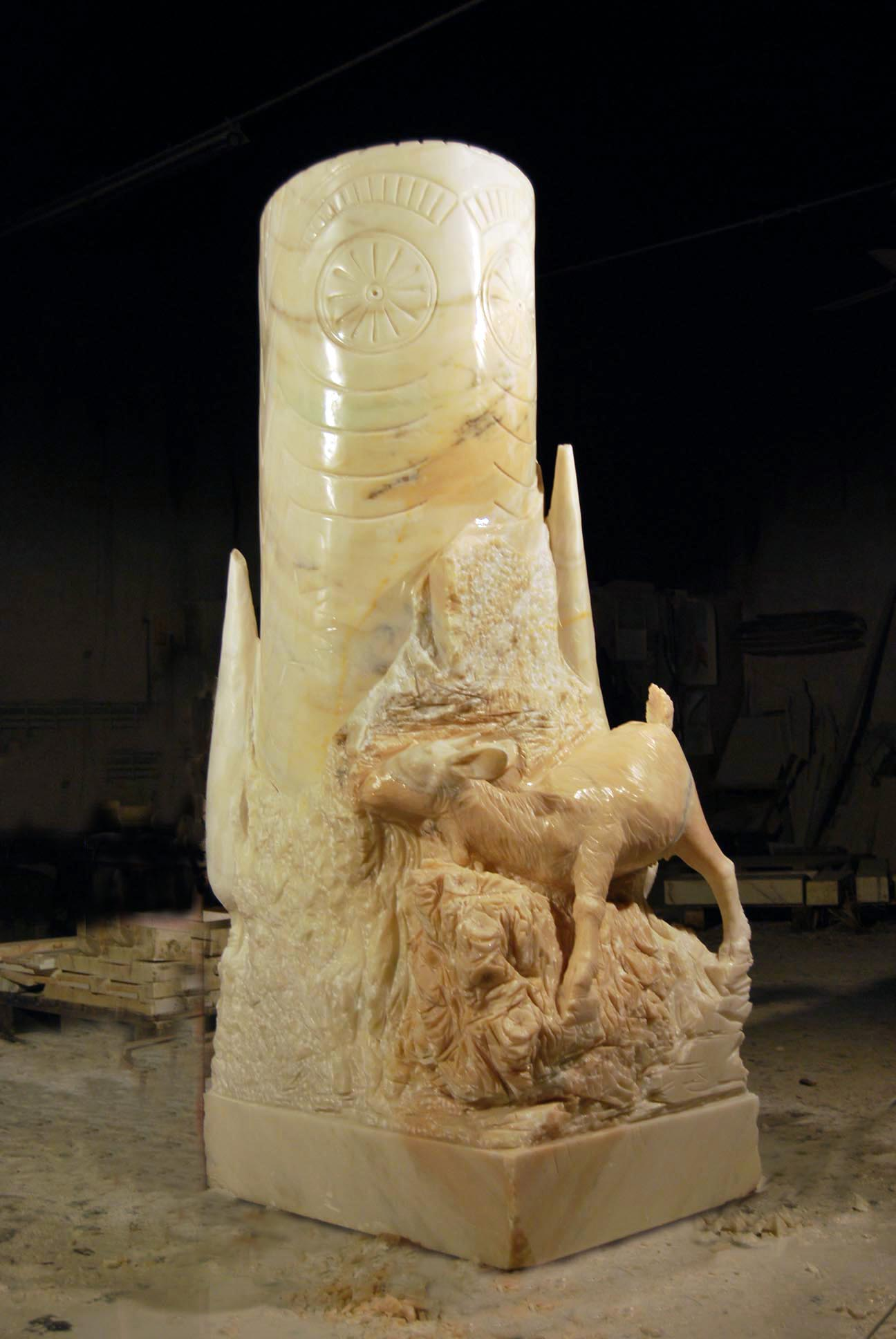
Ataegina by Pedro Roque Hidalgo (20th century), Museu do Mármore, Vila Viçosa, (Portugal).

Lusitanian mythology was heavily influenced by or related to Celtic mythology.

Also well attested in inscriptions are the names Bandua (one of the variants of Borvo) often with a second name linked to a locality such as Bandua Aetobrico, and Nabia, a goddess of rivers and streams.

According to Strabo the Lusitanians were given to offering sacrifices; they practiced divination on the sacrificial offering by inspecting its vitals and veins.

They also sacrificed human victims, prisoners of war, by striking them under coarse blankets and observing which way they fell. They cut off the right hands of their captives, which they offered to the gods.

== Language ==
The Lusitanian language was a Paleohispanic language that belongs to the Indo-European family. The precise affiliation of Lusitanian with the other Indo-European languages is still a matter of debate: there are those who endorse that it is a para-Celtic language with an obvious Celticity to most of the lexicon, over many anthroponyms and toponyms. A second theory relates Lusitanian with the Italic languages; based on the names of Lusitanian deities with other grammatical elements of the area.

One other hypothesis is that the Lusitanian language may have been basal Italo-Celtic, a branch independent from Celtic and Italic, and splitting off early from Proto-Celtic and Proto-Italic populations who spread from Central Europe into western Europe after new Yamnaya migrations into the Danube Valley. Alternatively, a European branch of Indo-European dialects, termed "Northwest Indo-European" and associated with the Beaker culture, may have been ancestral to not only Celtic and Italic, but also to Germanic and Balto-Slavic. Ellis Evans believes that Gallaecian and Lusitanian were one language (not separate languages) of the "P" Celtic variant. Some recent scholars' analyses, further conducted on a newly discovered inscription, strongly suggest that Lusitanian is more akin to Italic and has no relation to Celtic.

Lujan, argues that the evidence shows that Lusitanian must have diverged from the other western Indo-European dialects before the kernel of what would then evolve into the Italic and Celtic language families had formed. This points to Lusitanian being so ancient that it predates both the Celtic and Italic linguistic groups. Contact with subsequent Celtic migrations into the Iberian Peninsula are likely to have led to the linguistic assimilation of the Celtic elements found in the language.

The Lusitanian Celtic root however, is further emphasized in a 2023 research project by the Max Planck Institute on the origins of Indo-European languages. This study identified one common Celtic branch of peoples and languages spanning most of Atlantic Europe, including Lusitania, at around 7,000 BC. This work contradicts previous theories that excluded Lusitanian from the Celtic linguistic family. There is therefore no general consensus on the exact origin of the Lusitanian language.

== Tribes ==
Map showing the main pre-Roman tribes in Portugal and their main migrations: Turduli movement in red, Celtici in brown, and Lusitanian in blue; most tribes neighbouring the Lusitanians were dependent on them. Names are in Latin.

The Lusitanians were a people formed by several tribes that lived between the rivers Douro and Tagus, in most of today's Beira and Estremadura regions of central Portugal, and some areas of the Extremadura region (Spain).

They were a tribal confederation, not a single political entity; each tribe had its own territory and was independent, and was formed by smaller clans. However, they had a cultural sense of unity and a common name for the tribes.

Each tribe was ruled by its own tribal aristocracy and chief. Many members of the Lusitanian tribal aristocracy were warriors as happened in many other pre-Roman peoples of the Iron Age.

Only when an external threat occurred did the different tribes politically unite, as happened at the time of the Roman conquest of their territory when Viriathus became the single leader of the Lusitanian tribes. Punicus, Caucenus and Caesarus were other important Lusitanian chiefs before the Roman conquest. They ruled the Lusitanians (before Viriathus) for some time, leading the tribes in the resistance against Roman attempts of conquest, and were successful.

The known Lusitanian tribes were:

- Arabrigenses
- Araocelenses
- Aravi
- Coilarni/Colarni
- Interamnienses
- Lancienses
  - Lancienses Oppidani
  - Lancienses Transcudani
  - Lancienses Ocelenses (may be the same as the Oppidani)
- Meidubrigenses
- Paesuri - Douro and Vouga (Portugal)
- Palanti (there is not agreement among scholars if they were Vettones or Lusitanian)
  - Calontienses
  - Caluri
  - Coerenses
- Petravioi
- Tangi
  - Elbocori
  - Igaeditani
  - Tapori/Tapoli - by the river Tagus, around the border area between Portugal and Spain
- Talures
- Veaminicori
- Vissaieici

It remains to be known whether the Turduli Veteres, Turduli Oppidani, Turduli Bardili, and Turduli were Lusitanian tribes (coastal tribes), were related Celtic peoples, or were instead related to the Turdetani (Celtic, pre-Celtic Indo-European, or Iberians) and came from the south. The name Turduli Veteres (older or ancient Turduli), a tribe that dwelt in today's Aveiro District, seems to indicate they came from the north and not from the south (contrary to what is assumed on the map). Several Turduli peoples were possibly Callaeci tribes that initially came from the north, towards the south along the coast and then migrated inland along the Tagus and the Anas (Guadiana River) valleys.

If there were more Lusitanian tribes, their names are unknown.

== Warfare ==
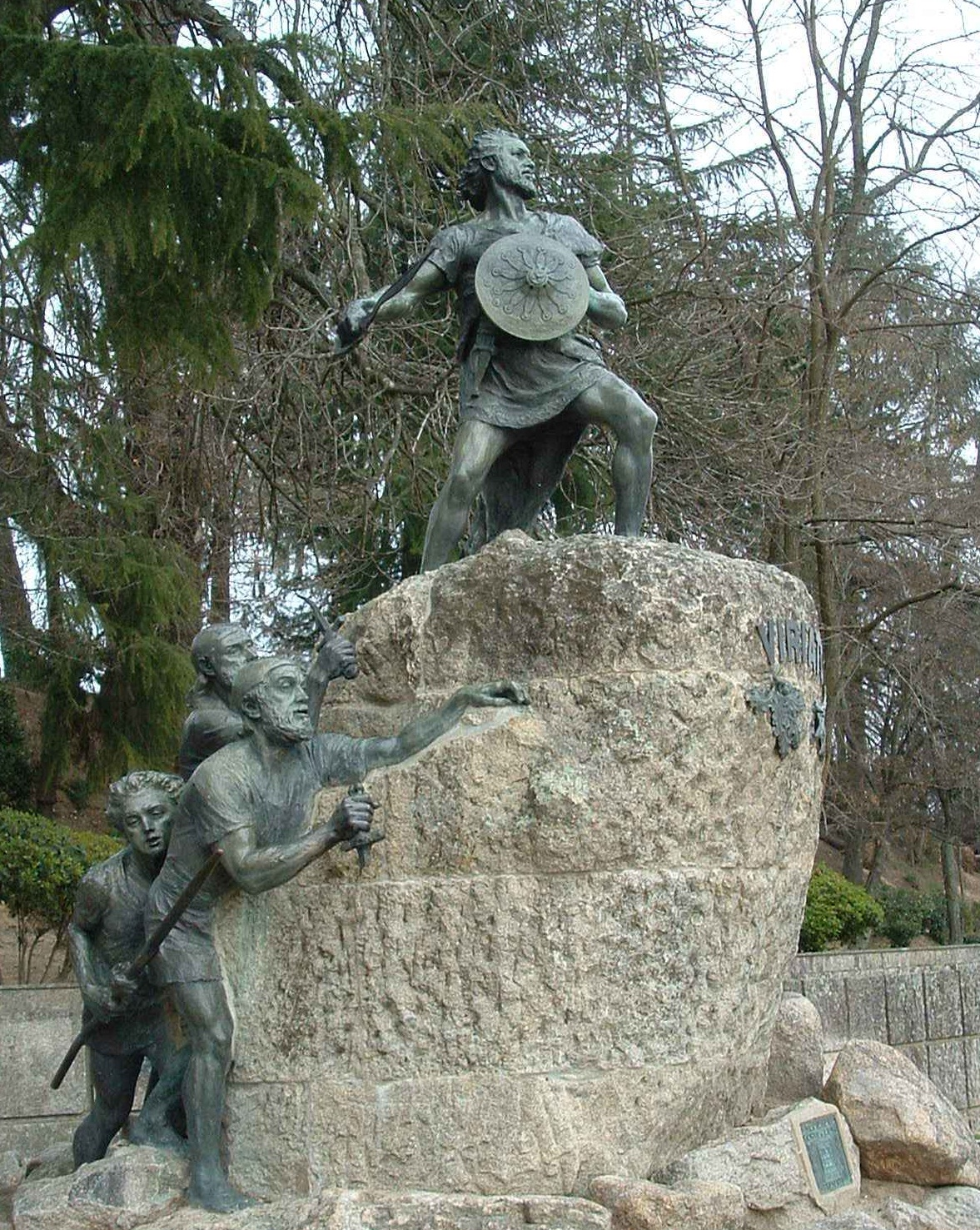
Statue of Viriatus in Viseu, the Lusitanian leader during the Lusitanian War (155 to 139 BCE).

The Lusitanians were considered by historians to be particularly adept at guerrilla warfare. The strongest amongst them were selected to defend the populace in mountainous sites. They used hooked javelins or saunions made of iron, and wielded swords and helmets like those of the Celtiberians. They threw their darts from some distance, yet often hit their marks and wounded their targets deeply. Being active and nimble warriors, they would pursue their enemies and decapitate them.

"In a narrow pass 300 Lusitani faced 1000 Romans; as a result of the action 70 of the former and 320 of the latter died. When the victorious Lusitani retired and dispersed confidently, one of them on foot became separated, and was surrounded by a detachment of pursuing cavalry. The lone warrior pierced the horse of one of the riders with his spear, and with a blow of his sword cut off the Roman’s head, producing such terror among the others that they prudently retired under his arrogant and contemptuous gaze."

— Orosius, Seven Books of History Against the Pagans, 5.4

In times of peace, they had a particular style of dancing, which required great agility and nimbleness of the legs and thighs. In times of war, they marched in time, until they were ready to charge the enemy.

Appian claims that when Praetor Brutus sacked Lusitania after Viriathus's death, the women fought valiantly next to their men as women warriors.

== Contemporary meaning ==
While the Lusitanians did not speak a Romance language, nowadays the term Lusitanian is often used as a metonym for the Portuguese people, and similarly Lusophone is used to refer to a Portuguese speaker within or outside Portugal, Brazil, Macau, Timor-Leste, Angola, Mozambique, Cape Verde, São Tomé and Príncipe, Guinea Bissau, and other overseas territories and countries formerly comprised within the Portuguese Empire.

== See also ==
- European Portuguese
- Geography of Portugal
  - Alentejo
  - Autonomous Regions of Portugal
  - Beira Alta
  - Beira Baixa
  - Continental Portugal
  - Ribatejo
- History of Portugal
- Emerita Augusta, capital of the Roman province of Lusitania (Lusitaniae et Vetoniae)
  - Hispania
  - List of ancient peoples of Portugal
  - List of Celtic place names in Portugal
  - List of wars involving the Lusitanians
  - Pre-Roman peoples of the Iberian Peninsula
  - Timeline of Portuguese history
- List of Celtic tribes
- National Museum of Archaeology in Lisbon
- Provinces of the Roman Empire
