= Bardili (Turduli) =

Pre-Roman tribe of Lusitania

Main language areas in Iberia c. 300 BC

The Bardili were a small, pre-Roman tribe of the Iberian Peninsula, and an offshoot of the widespread Turduli people, who lived in what is now southwestern Portugal in the 5th-1st centuries BC.

== Location ==
Migrating in conjunction with the Celtici, they settled the present Setúbal peninsula along the Tagus river mouth and the lower Sardum (Sado; Kallipos in the Greek sources) river valley around the 5th Century BC, where they founded several coastal towns. The exact location of the Bardili capital Bardo remains uncertain, though the towns of Equabona/Aquabona (Coina-a-Velha), Caetobriga/Cetobriga (Monte da Rotura, near Setúbal) and Salacia (Alcácer do Sal; Iberian-type mint: Ketuvion) have all been identified.

== History ==
In the mid-3rd century BC the Bardili were forced to acknowledge the suzerainty of Carthage at the latter part of the century. However, their history after the Second Punic War is unclear; they seem to have played no role in the Lusitanian Wars and subsequent conflicts during the 2nd-1st Centuries BC. It is almost certain that the Bardili recovered their independence, which they enjoyed for nearly a century before being included into Hispania Ulterior province by the Praetor Publius Licinius Crassus in the wake of his campaign against the Lusitani and Celtici in 93 BC. Later during the Sertorian Wars in 79 BC, Proconsul Quintus Caecilius Metellus Pius established a permanent military base at Caeciliana (near Setúbal), in order to prevent the Bardili from lending their support to Quintus Sertorius.

=== Romanization ===
Increasingly Romanized after the Ulterior Propraetor Julius Caesar campaigns against the Lusitani, Turduli Oppidani, and Turduli Veteres in 61-60 BC, they were aggregated to the new Lusitania province by Emperor Augustus in 27-13 BC.

== See also ==
- Celtici
- Cynetes
- Lusitanian Wars
- Pre-Roman peoples of the Iberian Peninsula
- Turduli
- Turduli Oppidani
- Turduli Veteres
