= Marcus Popillius Laenas (consul 139 BC) =

2nd century BC Roman politician

Marcus Popilius Laenas was a Roman politician in the second century BC.

== Family ==
He was a member of gens Popilia. His father was Marcus Popilius Laenas, consul in 173 BC.

== Career ==
In 154 BC, Laenas was sent as an ambassador to Liguria to investigate the accusations of the residents of the allied city of Massalia against the Ligurians of depredations and raids. In 146 BC, as part of an embassy to Corinth, Laenas was beaten up by a seditious crowd. This prompted Lucius Mummius to sack the city later that year in the Achaean War.

In 139 BC, he was elected consul together with Gnaeus Calpurnius Piso as his colleague. He took the province of Hispania Citerior and remained proconsul until 137 BC. There he unsuccessfully attempted to end the insurrection led by Viriathus, a Lusitanian chieftain that had defeated his consular predecessor.
