= Mary Harlow =

English archaeologist and classical scholar

Mary Harlow, FSA (born 20 October 1956) is an English archaeologist and classical scholar. Her research focuses on various aspects of Roman social history―such as age, family, dress and textiles―and their impact on the formation of ancient identity. Her approach strongly promotes interdisciplinary methods, using source materials to accompany the study of Roman dress.

== Education and career ==
Harlow studied at the University of Leicester gaining a BA in classical studies and PhD in ancient history. After the completion of her PhD she taught briefly at St Andrews, before joining the Institute of Archaeology and Antiquity at the University of Birmingham as senior lecturer in Roman history (1995–2012). Between 1995 and 2000 she was also an Associate Lecturer at the Open University. In 2000–2002 she held a Leverhulme Research Fellowship to study Dress and Identity in Late Antiquity. In 2013 Harlow returned to the University of Leicester, where she is now associate professor in ancient history in the School of Archeology and Ancient History.

Between 2011 and 2013 Harlow was also guest professor at the Danish National Research Foundation's Centre for Textile Research (CTR) in Copenhagen, where she took part in the TEMA (Textile Economies in the Mediterranean Area) research project. Since 2015, Harlow has been involved in the international research group ATOM (Ancient Textiles from the Orient to the Mediterranean), in collaboration with CTR and the CNRS, Paris.

On 15 March 2018, Harlow was elected a Fellow of the Society of Antiquaries (FSA).

== Selected bibliography ==
- Growing Up and Growing Old in Ancient Rome: A Life Course Approach (with Ray Laurence, 2002); ISBN 9780415202008
- The Clothed Body in the Ancient World (with Liza Cleland and Lloyd Llewellyn-Jones, 2005); ISBN 9781842171653
- Age and Ageing in the Roman Empire (with Ray Laurence, 2007); ISBN 978-1887829656
- ‘The Greek and Roman family’ (with Tim Parkin) in Blackwell’s Companion to Ancient History (2009), pp. 329–41; ISBN 9781405131506
- A Cultural History of Childhood and Family in Antiquity (with Ray Lawrence, 2010); ISBN 9781845208264
- Dress and Identity (2012); ISBN 9781407309422
- Families in the Roman and Late Antique World (with Lena Larsson Loven, 2012); ISBN 9781441174680
- Prehistoric, Ancient Near Eastern & Aegean Textiles and Dress: An Interdisciplinary Anthology (with Cécile Michel and Marie-Louise Nosch, 2014); ISBN 9781782977193
- Greek and Roman Textiles and Dress: An Interdisciplinary Anthology (with Marie-Louise Nosch, 2014); ISBN 9781782977155
- Spinning Fates and the Song of the Loom: The Use of Textiles, Clothing and Cloth Production as Metaphor, Symbol and Narrative Device in Greek and Latin Literature (with Giovanni Fanfani and Marie-Louise Nosch, 2016); ISBN 9781785701603
