= Renieblas =

- Municipality
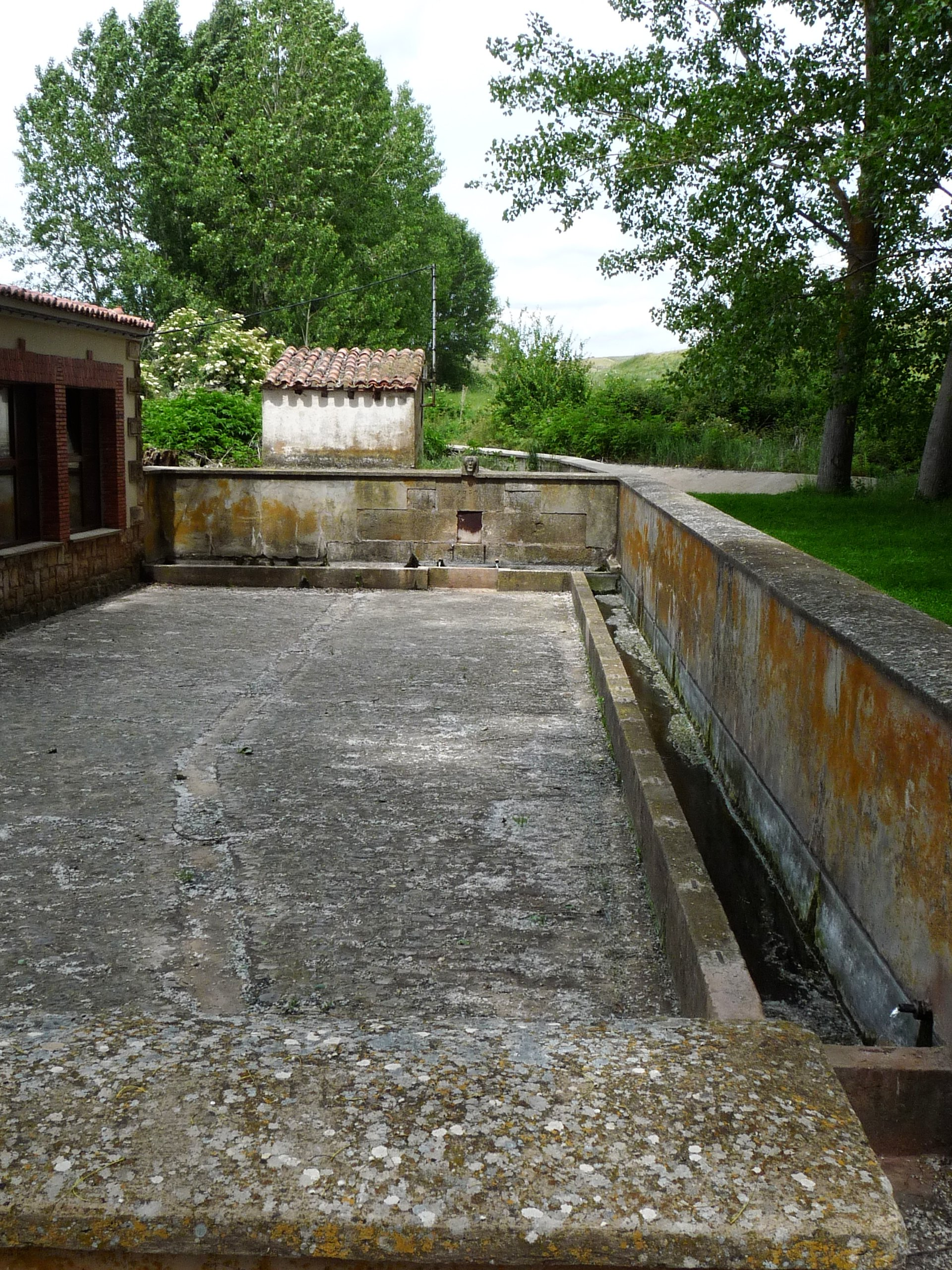

- Location in Spain. Renieblas (Spain)
- Coordinates: 41°49′17″N 2°22′13″W
- Country: Spain
- Autonomous community: Castile and León
- Province: Soria
- Comarca: Campo de Gómara

Government
  - Mayor: Fernando López

Area
  - Total: 36.23 km^{2} (13.99 sq mi)
- Elevation: 10,333 m (33,901 ft)

Population (2025-01-01)
  - Total: 107
  - Density: 2.95/km^{2} (7.65/sq mi)
- Time zone: UTC+1 (CET)
  - Summer (DST): UTC+2 (CEST)
- Climate: Cfb
- Website: Official website

Renieblas is a municipality located in the province of Soria, in the autonomous community of Castile and León, Spain.
