= Sextus Atilius Serranus =

2nd century Roman consul

Sextus Atilius Serranus was a Roman politician in the second century BC.

== Career ==
In 139 BC or earlier, Serranus served as praetor. In 136 BC, he was elected consul together with Lucius Furius Philus as his colleague. The proconsul of Hispania Citerior, Gaius Hostilius Mancinus, had signed a humiliating peace treaty with the Numantines. Having refused the treaty, Serranus sent Mancinus back to the Numantines in chains. In 135 BC, Serranus served as proconsul of Cisalpine Gaul.
