= Branca, Albergaria-a-Velha =

Civil parish in Portugal

Branca
- Civil parish
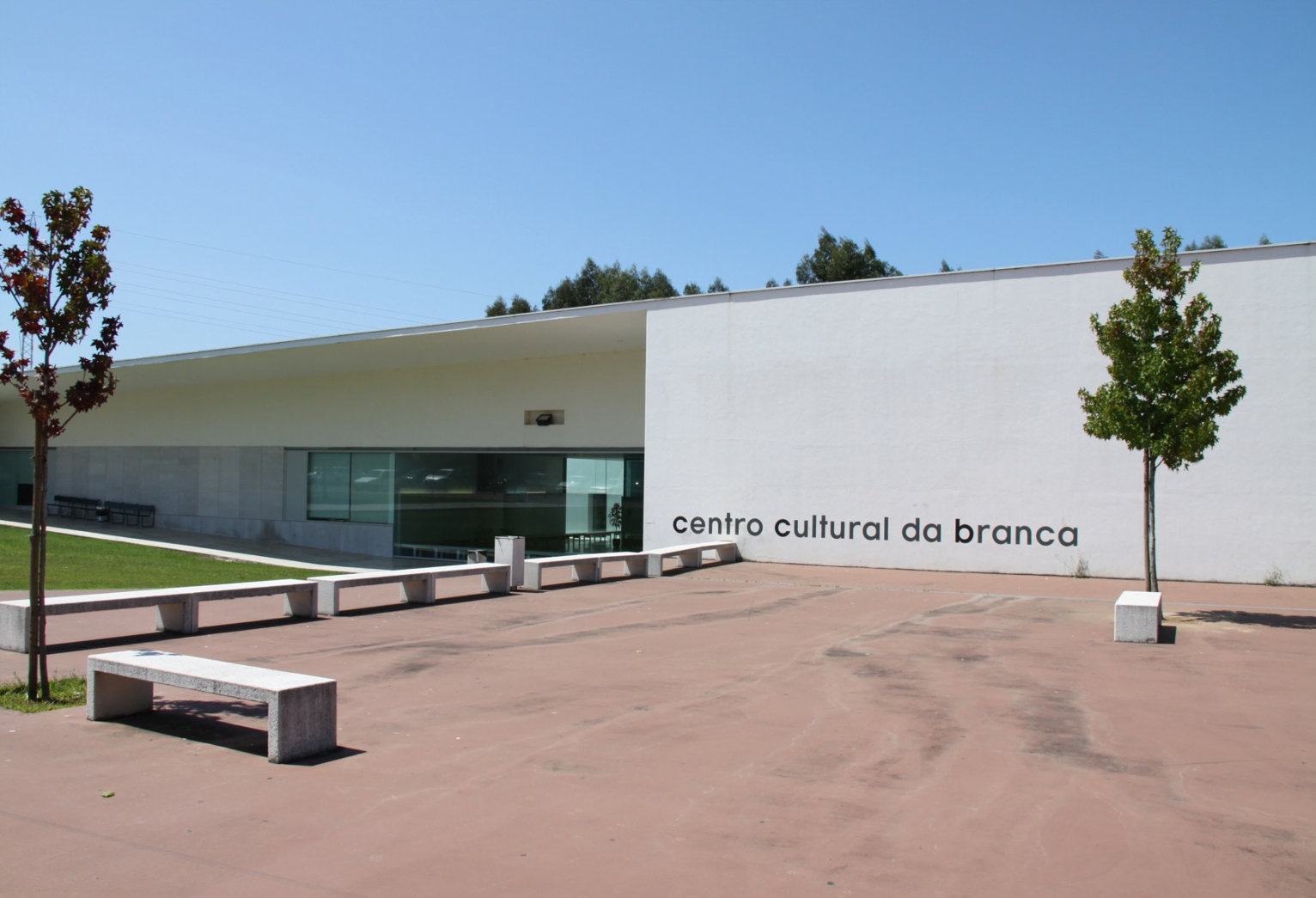

- Location in Portugal
- Coordinates: 40°44′N 8°29′W
- Country: Portugal
- Region: Centro
- Intermunic. comm.: Região de Aveiro
- District: Aveiro
- Municipality: Albergaria-a-Velha

Area
  - Total: 30.29 km^{2} (11.70 sq mi)
- Elevation: 151 m (495 ft)

Population (2011)
  - Total: 5,621
  - Density: 185.6/km^{2} (480.6/sq mi)
- Time zone: UTC+00:00 (WET)
  - Summer (DST): UTC+01:00 (WEST)
- Postal code: 3850 Branca ALB

Branca is a village and a civil parish of the municipality of Albergaria-a-Velha, Portugal. The population in 2011 was 5,621, in an area of 30.29 km^{2}.
