= Albergaria-a-Velha =

- Municipality
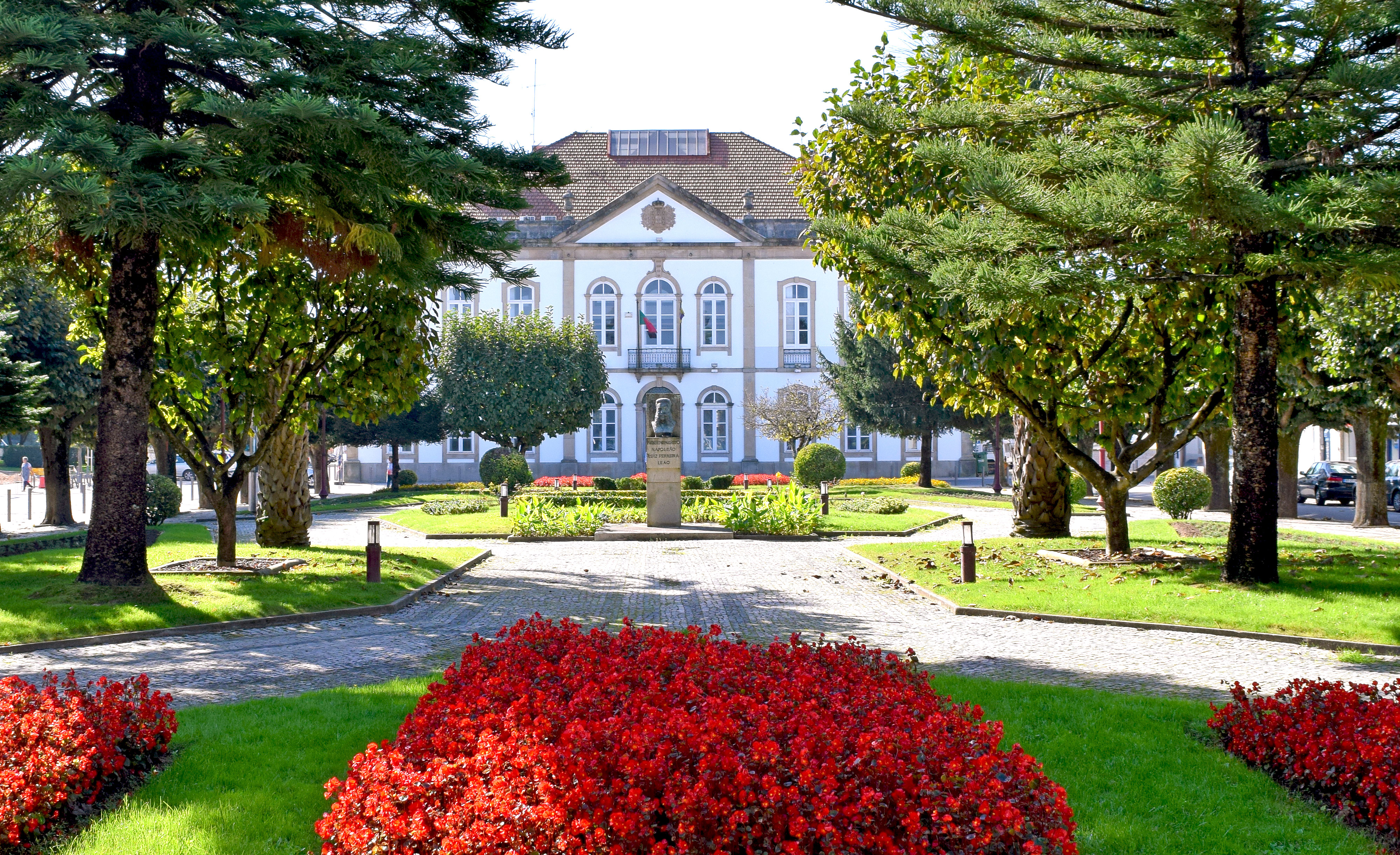
- Municipal Chamber of Albergaria-a-Velha

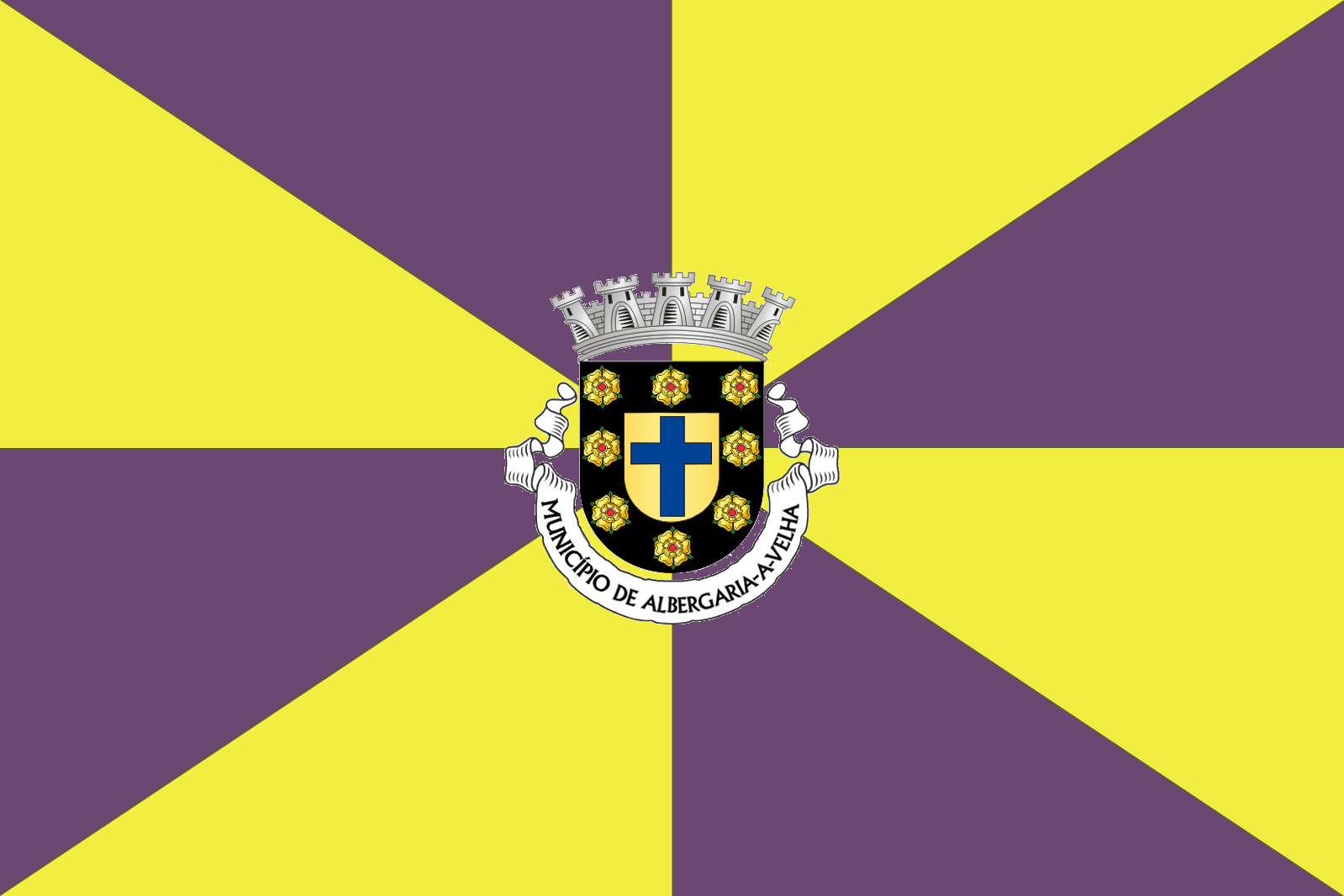
- Flag Coat of arms
- Interactive map of Albergaria-a-Velha
- Location in Portugal
- Coordinates: 40°41′36″N 8°28′52″W
- Country: Portugal
- Region: Centro
- Intermunic. comm.: Região de Aveiro
- District: Aveiro
- Parishes: 6

Government
  - President: João Agostinho Pinto Pereira (PSD)

Area
  - Total: 158.83 km^{2} (61.32 sq mi)
- Elevation: 124 m (407 ft)

Population (2011)
  - Total: 25,252
  - Density: 158.99/km^{2} (411.78/sq mi)
- Time zone: UTC+00:00 (WET)
  - Summer (DST): UTC+01:00 (WEST)
- Postal code: 3850
- Area code: 292
- Patron: Santa Cruz
- Website: www.cm-albergaria.pt

Albergaria-a-Velha (pronounced [alβɨɾɣɐˈɾi.ɐ ɐ ˈvɛʎɐ] or [alβɨɾɣɐˌɾi.aˈvɛʎɐ]) is a town and a municipality in the Aveiro District in Portugal. The population in 2011 was 25,252, in an area of 158.83 km^{2}. It had 19,687 eligible voters in 2006.

== History ==
In 1117, D. Teresa, Countess of Portucale, and mother of Afonso Henriques the first king of Portugal, donated to the nobleman Gonçalo Eriz the lands that constitute Albergaria-a-Velha. As part of the donation the nobleman was obligated to maintain open a hospice for poor travels. The document referred to this shelter for the travelling poor, or albergaria, and thus the area was known as Albergaria.

Later, the Carta do Couto de Osselôa was discovered that definitely identified both the first document to refer to Portugal as a Kingdom and at the same figured in the identification of Albergaria-a-Velha as an administrative unit of the country. The Bishop of Coimbra, D. Egas, in 1258, ordered this document to be transcribed in order to conserve it. Also, because it was the older Albergaria, owing to the existence of Albergaria-a-Nova, the community began to be referred to as Albergaria-a-Velha (meaning Portuguese for older).

The first references to Albergaria as town, developed in the 16th century, with the erection of an obelisk in the municipal square, around the location of the first hospital. It was ordered erected at the hospital by the Lisbon government on 27 May 1629.

The municipality was created in 1834, when the older municipality of Aveiro was dismembered, and the new administrative divisions Loure, Albergaria-a-Velha and Vale Maior reconstituted. Just after this reconstitution, the parish of Alquerubim (Paus) was annexed to Albergaria-a-Velha, and later the parishes of Branca, Ribeira de Fráguas ( both around 1855), Angeja and Frossos (in 1854) were incorporated.

== Geography ==
Population of Albergaria-a-Velha (1849–2006)
Year	Pop.	±%
1849	4,717	—
1900	13,526	+186.8%
1930	15,296	+13.1%
1960	18,446	+20.6%
1981	21,326	+15.6%
1991	21,995	+3.1%
2001	24,638	+12.0%
2004	25,497	+3.5%
2006	25,921	+1.7%

The municipality of Albergaria-a-Velha is located in the transition zone between the coastal municipalities of Murtosa, Aveiro, Estarreja and Ílhavo and the more mountain communities in the interior.

Administratively, the municipality is divided into 6 civil parishes (freguesias):

- Albergaria-a-Velha e Valmaior
- Alquerubim
- Angeja
- Branca
- Ribeira de Fráguas
- São João de Loure e Frossos

== Economy ==
The fertile lands of Albergaria-a-Velha have been historically a center of agriculture and cattle-raising, so much so, that it has been erroneously considered an agricultural community. In fact, the secondary sector represents 56.2% of the activity within the municipality, while the primary sector occupies 13.6% of the economic activity. This secondary sector includes basic industrial businesses involved in metallurgy, industrial textiles and lumber industries. These companies are primarily small- to medium-size enterprises with less than 20 employees.

Most of the transformative sectors are concentrated in the parishes of Albergaria-a-Velha and Branca, representing about 90% of the secondary sector. The urbanized are of the parish of Albergaria-a-Velha is the primary beneficiary of these industries; its geo-strategic position in the center of the municipality and industrial zone provides the region with incubator affects. Activities such as metallurgy and fabrication, equipment production, transformation of lumber goods, paper production, the fabrication and restoration of furniture, as well as the production of ceramics, provide Albergaria-a-Velha with a diversified economic base.

== Tourism ==
Water Mills Route

The water mills are predominant in Albergaria-a-Velha – a municipality with the largest number of water mills in Europe – constituting one of the most important elements of the rural landscape throughout the entire municipality. These are elements with high patrimonial value that are enjoyed by their citizens and visitors.

Albergaria-a-Velha is a land of traditions made of water, bread and mills. The Water Mills Route is currently made up of 11 clusters in a total of 14 mills with 19 couples of millstones, distributed in different parishes of the county.

The mill was the central place in the life of a rural community, where the memories of once, are still very much alive in the daily rituals of the millers and in the endless spinning of their millstones and casters. Mills are distributed across the entire municipality; however, those situated along the Rio Caima are the most prominent and significant, as the river's greater flow stability enabled continuous operation. However, also in the rivers Fílveda and Jardim, in the streams of Albergaria-a-Velha, Fontão, Frias, Fial and Mouquim and in the countless corgas and ditches of all the parishes, there are traces or records of more than three and a half hundred mills, indicating the importance that the mill activity had in the region.

These mills were built mainly in the 18th and 19th centuries, using local construction materials. Situated on the banks of rivers and streams, they took advantage of the water force of the watercourses, diverting it by taking it directly to the cube where the pressure was increased by the effect of gravity, feeding the feathers of the wooden caster and making it rotate.

The force generated by this action is transmitted by the axis, generating the force to move the stone wheels. Many of them were mills of several owners, so they were used according to a schedule previously agreed between all their users.

Here the local crops were mainly ground, with particular emphasis on corn and wheat. These mills were also used for the husking of rice produced in the Baixo Vouga region, using cork slabs that covered the millstones, which reduced their abrasive effect.

== Notable people ==
- Silvino Vidal (1850–1937), Portuguese-Brazilian writer
