= Ray Laurence =

Professor of ancient history at Macquarie University

Ray Laurence is professor of ancient history at Macquarie University. He has won the Routledge Ancient History Prize for his first book Roman Pompeii: Space and Society, and the Longman-History Today New Generation Prize for his book Pompeii: The Living City.

He was educated at Leighton Park School and Newcastle University both in the United Kingdom.

== Selected publications ==
- Roman Pompeii: Space and Society (1996) ISBN 978-0415141031
- Pompeii: The Living City (2006) ISBN 978-0312355852
- Growing Up and Growing Old in Ancient Rome (2001) ISBN 978-0415202015
- The Roads of Roman Italy: Mobility and Cultural Change (2011) ISBN 978-0415620062
- Roman Archaeology for Historians (2012) ISBN 978-0415505925
- Rome, Ostia, Pompeii: Movement and Space (2012) ISBN 978-0199583126
- The City in the Roman West (2011) ISBN 978-0521701402
- The Cultural History of Shopping in Antiquity (2022) ISBN 978-1350026964
- The Cultural History of Childhood and Family in Antiquity (2010) ISBN 978-1847887948
