= Turduli =

Historic ethnic group

The Iberian Peninsula in the 3rd century BC.

The Turduli (Greek Tourduloi) or Turtuli were an ancient pre-Roman people of the southwestern Iberian Peninsula.

== Location ==
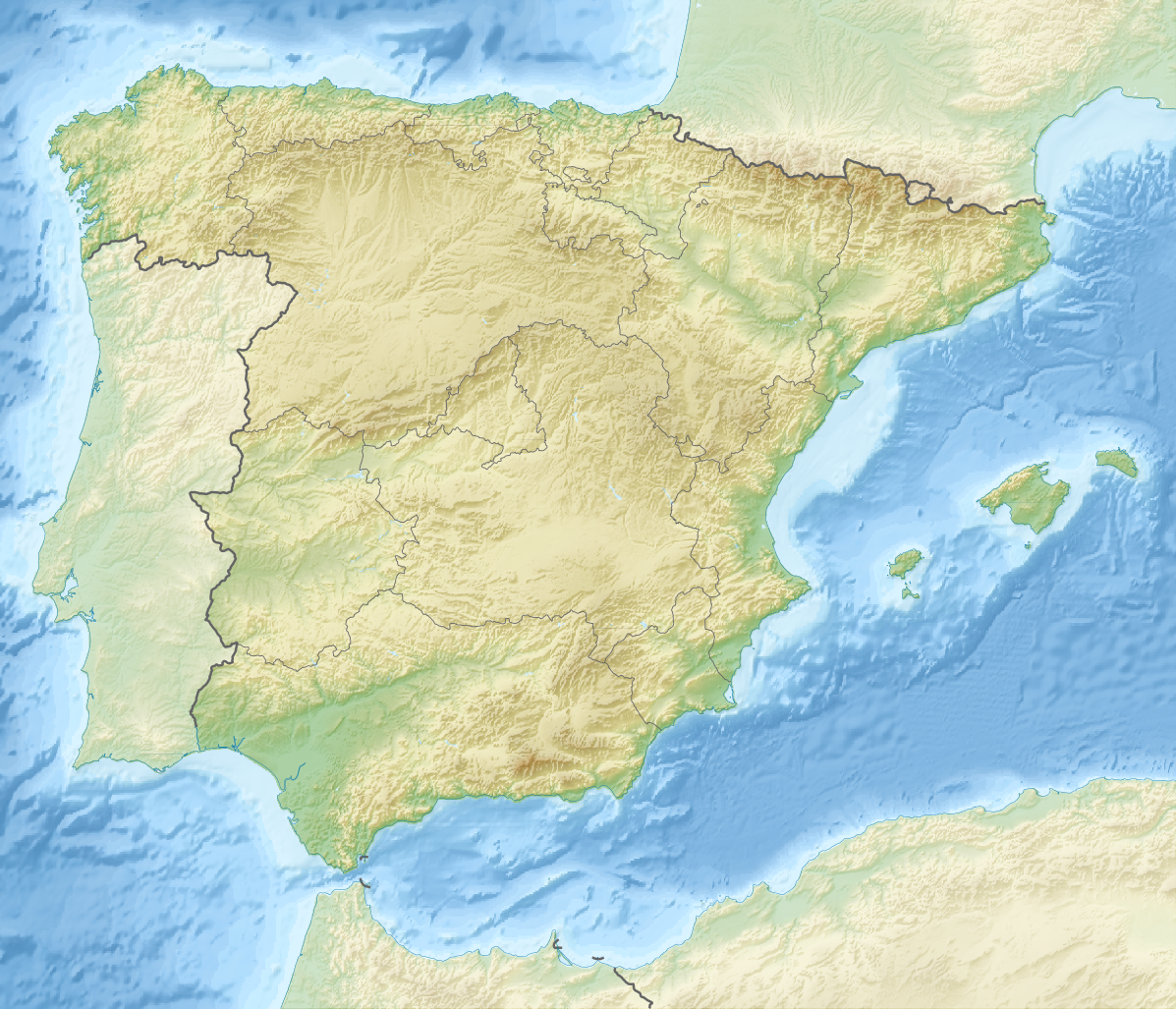
Pre-Roman towns most strongly associated with the Turdulli

The Turduli tribes lived mainly in the south and centre of modern Portugal – in the east of the provinces of Beira Litoral, coastal Estremadura and Alentejo along the Guadiana valley, and in Extremadura and Andalusia in Spain. Their capital was the old oppidum of Ibolca (sometimes transliterated as Ipolka), known as Obulco in Roman times, and which currently corresponds to the city of Porcuna, currently located between the provinces of Córdoba and Jaén. Apart from Ibolca, the pre-Roman towns most strongly associated with the Turdulli include Budua (Badajoz), Dipo (Guadajira), Mirobriga (Capilla), and Sisapo (Almadén).

== Origins ==
While they are sometimes described, in the available ancient sources, as being related ethnically to the neighboring Turdetani of Baetica (modern Andalusia), the exact ethnic origins remain obscure. The only evidence regarding the original Turdulian language are a few funerary inscriptions. Linguistic studies of these texts suggest that the early Turduli spoke an Indo-European language. Some scholars in the past, have put forward evidence that the language belonged to the Anatolian branch of Indo-European and was similar, in particular, to Paeonian-Mysian. There may also have been cultural links to the Ligurians and Illyrians (who were native to the western Balkans).

== History ==
According to the 4th century BC Greek geographer and explorer Pytheas, quoted by Strabo in the 1st century AD, their ancestral homeland was located north of Turdetania (the region where was located the semi-legendary Kingdom of Tartessos, in the Baetis River valley, the present-day Guadalquivir), in the modern Spanish eastern Extremadura region, where their ancient capital Regina Tourdulorum (Reina – Badajoz) once stood.

The collapse of Tartessos in around 530 BC, and migrations by the Celtici in the 6th-5th centuries BC appear to have also caused mass migrations by the Turduli. Most of them settled the middle Anas (Guadiana) basin, a region known as Beturia or Baeturia Turdulorum roughly corresponding to parts of eastern Alentejo, and the western half of the modern Badajoz and southeastern Huelva provinces, hence the name Baetici Turduli. Others went west, colonizing the central coastal Portuguese region of Estremadura and became known as Turduli Oppidani. Some went south, where they settled the present Setubal peninsula along the Tagus river mouth and the lower Sardum (Sado; Kallipos in the Greek sources) river valley as the Bardili. The remnants, designated Turduli Veteres in the ancient sources, migrated northwards in conjunction with the Celtici and ended settling the Beira Litoral, a coastal region situated along the lower Douro and Vacca (Vouga) river basins.

== See also ==
- Bardili (Turduli)
- Cynetes
- Tartessos
- Turdetani
- Turduli Oppidani
- Turduli Veteres
- Pre-Roman peoples of the Iberian Peninsula
