= List of freguesias of Portugal: E =

The freguesias (civil parishes) of Portugal are listed in by municipality according to the following format:

- concelho
  - freguesias

== Elvas ==
  - Ajuda, Salvador e Santo Ildefonso
  - Alcáçova
  - Assunção
  - Barbacena
  - Caia e São Pedro
  - Santa Eulália
  - São Brás e São Lourenço
  - São Vicente e Ventosa
  - Terrugem
  - Vila Boim
  - Vila Fernando

== Entroncamento ==
  - Entroncamento

== Espinho ==
  - Anta
  - Espinho
  - Guetim
  - Paramos
  - Silvalde

== Esposende ==
  - Antas
  - Apúlia
  - Belinho
  - Curvos
  - Esposende
  - Fão
  - Fonte Boa
  - Forjães
  - Gandra
  - Gemeses
  - Mar
  - Marinhas
  - Palmeira de Faro
  - Rio Tinto
  - Vila Chã

== Estarreja ==
  - Avanca
  - Beduído
  - Canelas
  - Fermelã
  - Pardilhó
  - Salreu
  - Veiros

== Estremoz ==
  - Arcos
  - Estremoz (Santa Maria)
  - Estremoz (Santo André)
  - Évora Monte (Santa Maria)
  - Glória
  - Santa Vitória do Ameixial
  - Santo Estêvão
  - São Bento de Ana Loura
  - São Bento do Ameixial
  - São Bento do Cortiço
  - São Domingos de Ana Loura
  - São Lourenço de Mamporcão
  - Veiros

== Évora ==
  - Bacelo
  - Canaviais
  - Évora (Santo Antão)
  - Évora (São Mamede)
  - Horta das Figueiras
  - Malagueira
  - Nossa Senhora da Boa Fé
  - Nossa Senhora da Graça do Divor
  - Nossa Senhora da Torega
  - Nossa Senhora de Guadalupe
  - Nossa Senhora de Machede
  - São Bento do Mato
  - São Manços
  - São Miguel de Machede
  - São Sebastião da Giesteira
  - São Vicente do Pigeiro
  - Sé e São Pedro
  - Senhora da Saúde
  - Torre de Coelheiros
