= Renato Santos (footballer, born 1991) =

Portuguese footballer

Personal information
- Full name: Renato João Saleiro Santos
- Date of birth: 5 October 1991 (age 35)
- Place of birth: Pardilhó, Portugal
- Height: 1.75 m (5 ft 9 in)
- Position: Winger

Youth career
- 1999–2003: Estarreja
- 2003–2010: Sporting CP

Senior career*
Years	Team	Apps	(Gls)
2010–2015	Rio Ave	10	(0)
2010–2012	→ Moreirense (loan)	33	(4)
2012–2013	→ Aves (loan)	30	(3)
2015	→ Tondela (loan)	19	(3)
2015–2018	Boavista	82	(11)
2018–2020	Málaga	59	(2)
2021	Volos	13	(0)
2021	Busan IPark	10	(0)
2022	Algeciras	13	(0)
2022–2023	Torreense	25	(4)
2023–2024	Olympiakos Nicosia	16	(4)
2025–2026	Atlético	4	(0)
- * Club domestic league appearances and goals as of 7 May 2026

Renato João Saleiro Santos (born 5 October 1991) is a Portuguese professional footballer who plays as a winger.

== Club career ==
Born in the village of Pardilhó in Estarreja, Aveiro District, Santos played youth football for two clubs, including Sporting CP from ages 11 to 18. Having signed with Rio Ave F.C. in the summer of 2010, he was successively loaned to Moreirense F.C. and C.D. Aves, with both sides competing in the Segunda Liga.

Santos returned to the Estádio dos Arcos for the 2013–14 season, making his debut in the Primeira Liga on 28 September 2013 when he came as a 64th-minute substitute in a 0–3 home loss against C.D. Nacional. In January 2015, he was once again loaned to a second-tier team, contributing 12 starts as C.D. Tondela promoted to the top flight for the first time in its history.

On 31 August 2015, Boavista F.C. signed free agent Santos to a three-year contract. He played 29 games in all competitions in his first year, scoring four goals.

Firmly established in the starting XI under both Erwin Sánchez and his successor Miguel Leal, Santos netted from spectacular efforts to help to away wins over Rio Ave (2–1, 6 November 2016) and C.D. Nacional (2–0, 22 December). Late in the year, he agreed to a new two-year deal.

On 17 July 2018, Santos signed a three-year contract with Segunda División club Málaga CF. He was released on 3 October 2020 along with seven other first-team players, due to a layoff.
