= Fonte de Angeão e Covão do Lobo =

- Civil parish
- Location in Portugal
- Coordinates: 40.4525°N 8.675°W
- Country: Portugal
- Region: Centro
- Intermunic. comm.: Região de Aveiro
- District: Aveiro
- Municipality: Vagos

Area
  - Total: 17.55 km^{2} (6.78 sq mi)

Population (2011)
  - Total: 2,165
  - Density: 120/km^{2} (320/sq mi)
- Time zone: UTC+00:00 (WET)
  - Summer (DST): UTC+01:00 (WEST)

Fonte de Angeão e Covão do Lobo is a civil parish in the municipality of Vagos, Aveiro district, Portugal. It was formed in 2013 by the merger of the former parishes Fonte de Angeão and Covão do Lobo. The population in 2011 was 2,165, in an area of 17.55 km^{2}. The former parish Fonte de Angeão includes three hamlets: Fonte de Angeão, Parada de Cima and Gandara.
