= Pessegueiro do Vouga =

- Civil parish
- Coordinates: 40.710°N 8.370°W
- Country: Portugal
- Region: Centro
- Intermunic. comm.: Região de Aveiro
- District: Aveiro
- Municipality: Sever do Vouga

Area
  - Total: 15.85 km^{2} (6.12 sq mi)

Population (2011)
  - Total: 1,852
  - Density: 120/km^{2} (300/sq mi)
- Time zone: UTC+00:00 (WET)
  - Summer (DST): UTC+01:00 (WEST)
- Postal code: 3741-801

Pessegueiro do Vouga is a freguesia in Sever do Vouga, Aveiro District, Portugal. The population in 2011 was 1,852, in an area of 15.85 km^{2}.
