= John da Silva Antao =

Portuguese-American priest

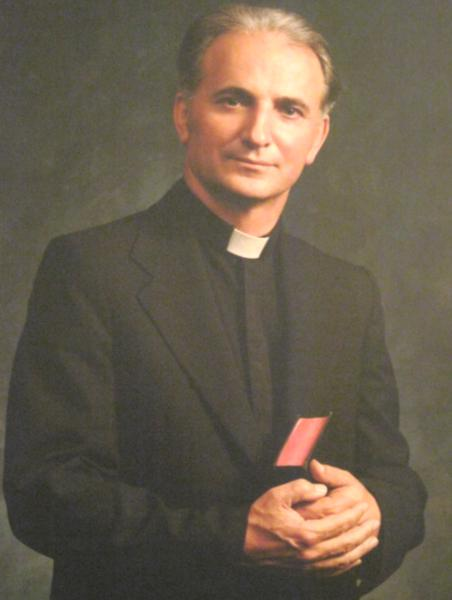
- Born: March 10, 1933 (age 93); Salreu, Estarreja, Portugal
- Education: Seton Hall University
- Parent(s): José Nunes Antão; Ana Rosa da Silva

John da Silva Antão (born March 1933 in Salreu, Estarreja, Portugal) is a priest in the Archdiocese of Newark, and a religious leader of the Portuguese-American community in New Jersey and a community leader in Elizabeth, NJ.

== Early years and studies ==
The son of a farmer, Antão entered the seminary at the early age of 11 in the city of Aveiro, Portugal and in 1956 the Patriarchal Seminary of Lisbon in Olivais. After his parents immigrated to the United States he went on to continue his studies at Immaculate Conception Seminary, the school of theology at Seton Hall University, then located in Darlington, NJ. After many years of study he was ordained priest in 1960 by bishop Walter Curtis, then auxiliary bishop of Newark. the rite of ordination was celebrated at Our Lady of Fatima Church in Newark, on October 7, 1960.

== In New Jersey ==
Father John was designated parochial vicar at Our Lady of Fatima parish in Newark, NJ. Very quickly became a good communicator and helped the pastor at that parish to found a Portuguese language newspaper "Novos Rumos", that reached beyond the state borders. In 1970, he was approached to help organize a parish community in the city of Elizabeth. The Archbishop of Newark, upon erecting a parish for the Portuguese speaking people in that city, he was elected as their pastor on May 13, 1973. In September 1983 he was elevated to the distinction of honorary prelate with the title of monsignor by pope John Paul II.

== Recognition ==
He is a recipient of many awards and commendations. The city of Elizabeth, through its Board of Education, on November 17, 2005 named a new school in his honor, recognizing in him one of the city's most active community leaders. Thus school no. 31, one of the newest buildings in the Elizabeth Public Schools bears the name of Monsignor João S. Antão School No. 31.
