= Manuel Freire =

- Birth name: Manuel Augusto Coentro de Pinho Freire
- Born: 25 April 1942 (age 82); Vagos, Aveiro District, Portugal
- Occupation: Singer
- Years active: 1968-present

Manuel Freire (Manuel Augusto Coentro de Pinho Freire) is a Portuguese influential left-wing singer and composer, although he also works as a computer technician. Freire was born in Vagos, Aveiro District on 25 April 1942.

Freire's first work was an EP, released in 1968, with the title "Livre" ("Free"), that included 4 songs. "Livre", "Dedicatória", "Pedro Soldado" and "Eles". The best-known song was "Livre", a hymn to the free will and thought as the album was released during the Fascist regime of Oliveira Salazar, against the official censorship. After that, Freire became a close friend of some of the most influential left-wing musicians like Zeca Afonso, Padre Fanhais or Adriano Correia de Oliveira. Some years later, still during the dictatorial regime, Freire participated in a TV show, in the only Portuguese station operating at the time, RTP, the "Zip-Zip", singing a poem by António Gedeão called "Pedra Filosofal" ("Philosopher's Stone") that became his most well-known song.

Later, he released an album composed by 11 songs, which had lyrics written by Portuguese poets, like António Gedeão, José Gomes Ferreira, Fernando Assis Pacheco, Eduardo Olímpio, Sidónio Muralha and José Saramago. For this album, Freire received the Portuguese Press Award, the most prestigious prize awarded to a musician in Portugal, at the time.

After the Carnation Revolution, in 1974, Freire continued his political action through the music, acting for the working class in several places around the country. In 1978, he returned with another album, "Devolta", once more, singing poems of great Portuguese poets.

He then continued his work as a computer technician, but returned in 1993 with a re-edition of his work "Pedra Filosofal". In 1995, he performed in the opening of the Festa do Avante!, a cultural event, carried out by the Portuguese Communist Party. His show, along with the Portuguese folk band Brigada Victor Jara, was an homage to Adriano Correia de Oliveira.

Nowadays, he continues his career, often playing in trade union or Communist rallies.

In 2003, Freire was elected president of the Portuguese Society of Authors. As of July 2010, he still holds that position.
