= São Lourenço do Bairro =

Civil parish in Portugal

- Civil parish
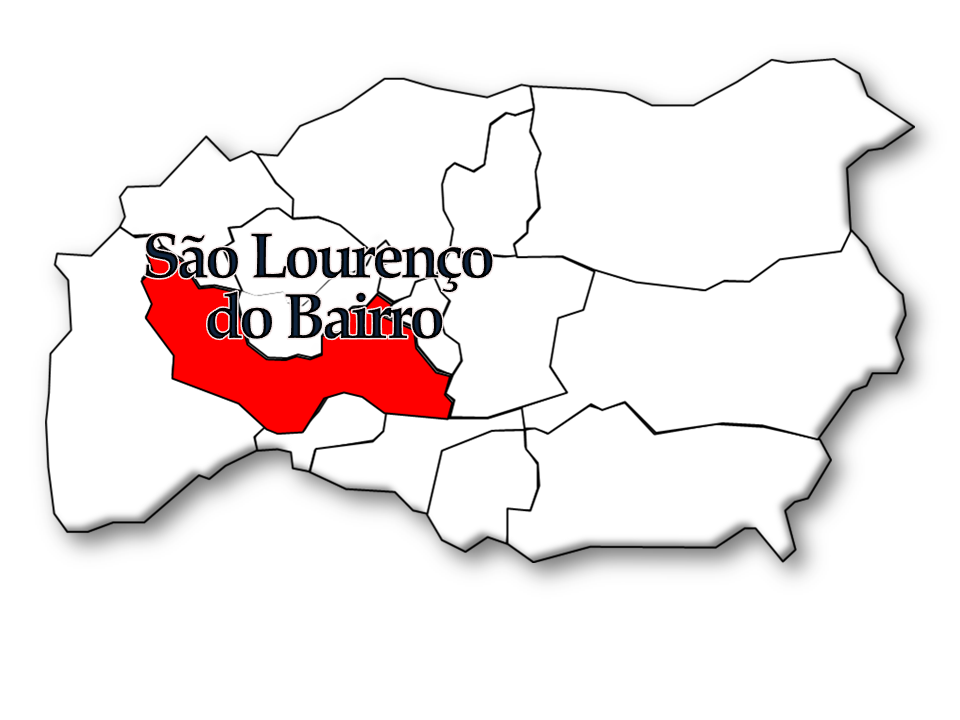
- Location in the municipality of Anadia

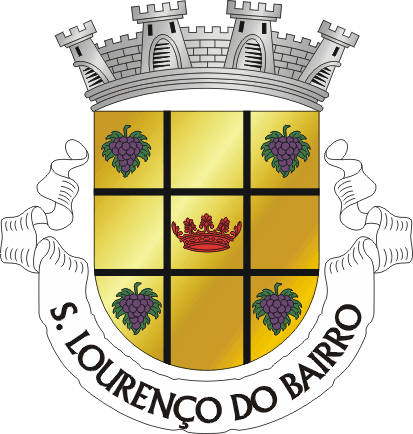
- Coat of arms

- Location in Portugal
- Coordinates: 40°26′16″N 8°29′54″W
- Country: Portugal
- Region: Centro
- Intermunic. comm.: Região de Aveiro
- District: Aveiro
- Municipality: Anadia

Area
  - Total: 15.38 km^{2} (5.94 sq mi)

Population (2011)
  - Total: 2,414
  - Density: 157.0/km^{2} (406.5/sq mi)
- Time zone: UTC+00:00 (WET)
  - Summer (DST): UTC+01:00 (WEST)

São Lourenço do Bairro is a village and a civil parish of the municipality of Anadia, Portugal. The population in 2011 was 2.414, in an area of 15.38 km^{2}.

In September 2023 two large wine tanks burst at the Levira distillery in the village, sending an estimated 2.2 million litres of wine flowing through its streets and flooding the basement of a house.
