= Vilarinho do Bairro =

Civil parish in Portugal

- Civil parish
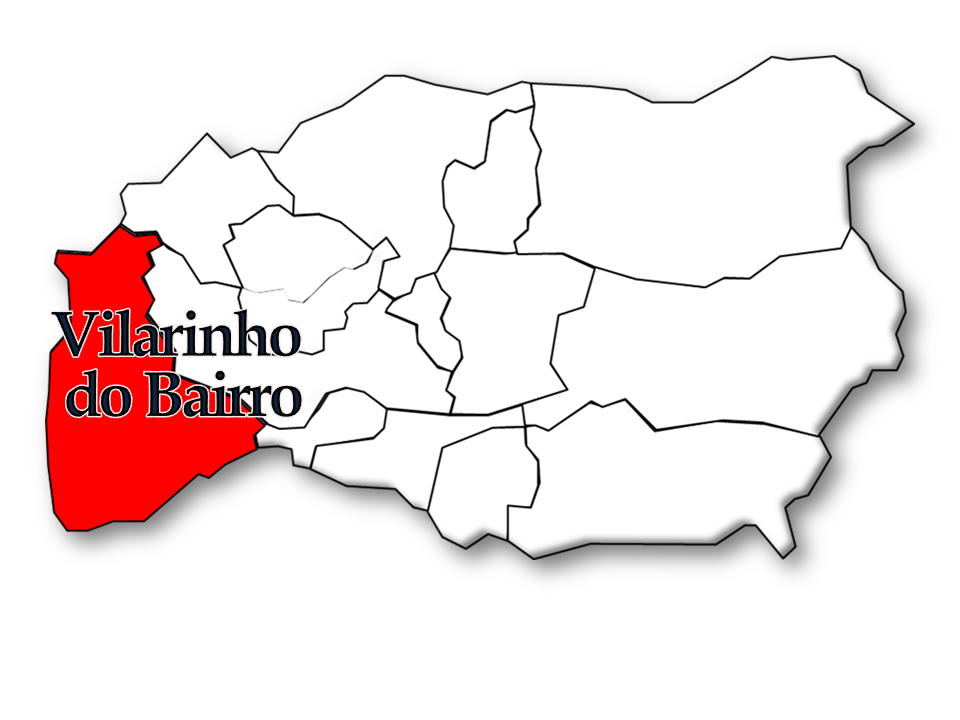
- Location in the municipality of Anadia

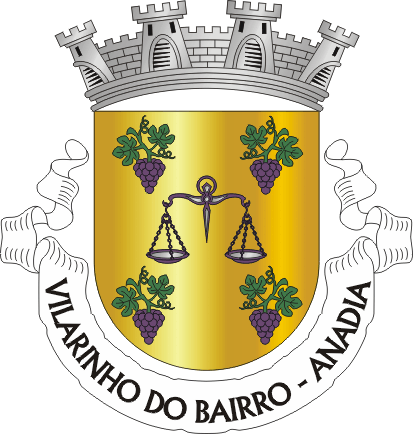
- Coat of arms

- Location in Portugal
- Coordinates: 40°25′17″N 8°31′44″W
- Country: Portugal
- Region: Centro
- Intermunic. comm.: Região de Aveiro
- District: Aveiro
- Municipality: Anadia

Area
  - Total: 25.56 km^{2} (9.87 sq mi)

Population (2011)
  - Total: 2,764
  - Density: 108.1/km^{2} (280.1/sq mi)
- Time zone: UTC+00:00 (WET)
  - Summer (DST): UTC+01:00 (WEST)

Vilarinho do Bairro is a village and a civil parish of the municipality of Anadia, Portugal. The population in 2011 was 2,764, in an area of 25.56 km^{2}.
