= Couto de Esteves =

- Civil parish
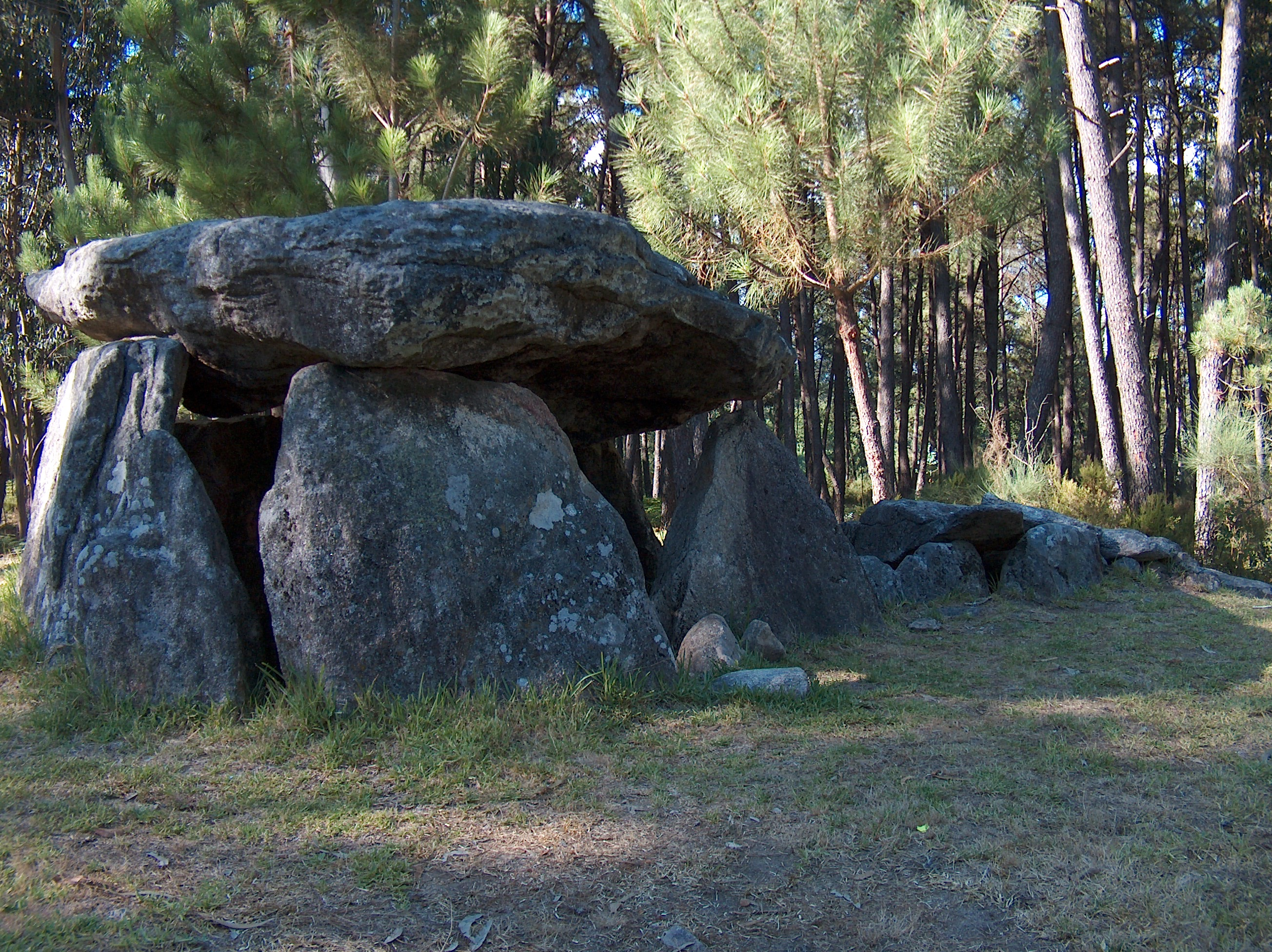
- The Dólmen da Arca da Cerqueira

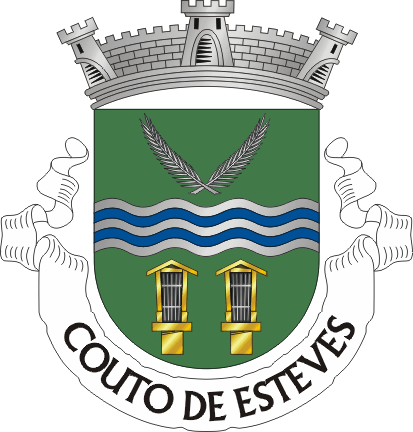
- Coat of arms

- Coordinates: 40.758°N 8.309°W
- Country: Portugal
- Region: Centro
- Intermunic. comm.: Região de Aveiro
- District: Aveiro
- Municipality: Sever do Vouga

Area
  - Total: 16.42 km^{2} (6.34 sq mi)

Population (2011)
  - Total: 890
  - Density: 54/km^{2} (140/sq mi)
- Time zone: UTC+00:00 (WET)
  - Summer (DST): UTC+01:00 (WEST)

Couto de Esteves is a freguesia in Sever do Vouga, Aveiro District, Portugal. The population in 2011 was 890, in an area of 16.42 km^{2}. The Dólmen da Arca da Cerqueira is located in the freguesia.
