= Avelãs de Caminho =

Civil parish in Portugal

- Civil parish
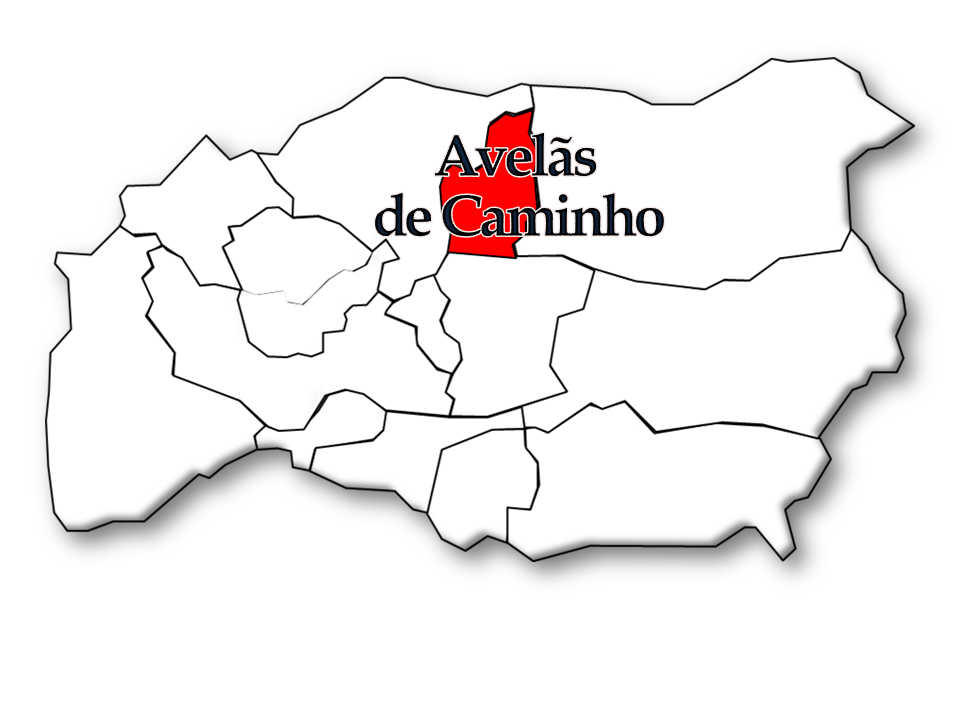
- Location in the municipality of Anadia

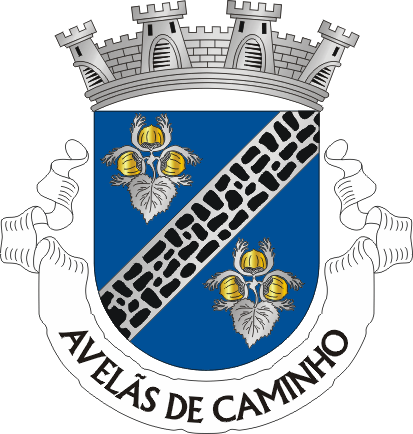
- Coat of arms

- Location in Portugal
- Coordinates: 40°28′45″N 8°27′12″W
- Country: Portugal
- Region: Centro
- Intermunic. comm.: Região de Aveiro
- District: Aveiro
- Municipality: Anadia

Area
  - Total: 6.45 km^{2} (2.49 sq mi)

Population (2011)
  - Total: 1,252
  - Density: 194/km^{2} (503/sq mi)
- Time zone: UTC+00:00 (WET)
  - Summer (DST): UTC+01:00 (WEST)

Avelãs de Caminho is a village and a civil parish of the municipality of Anadia, Portugal. The population in 2011 was 1,252, in an area of 6.45 km^{2}.
