= Avelãs de Cima =

Civil parish in Portugal

- Civil parish
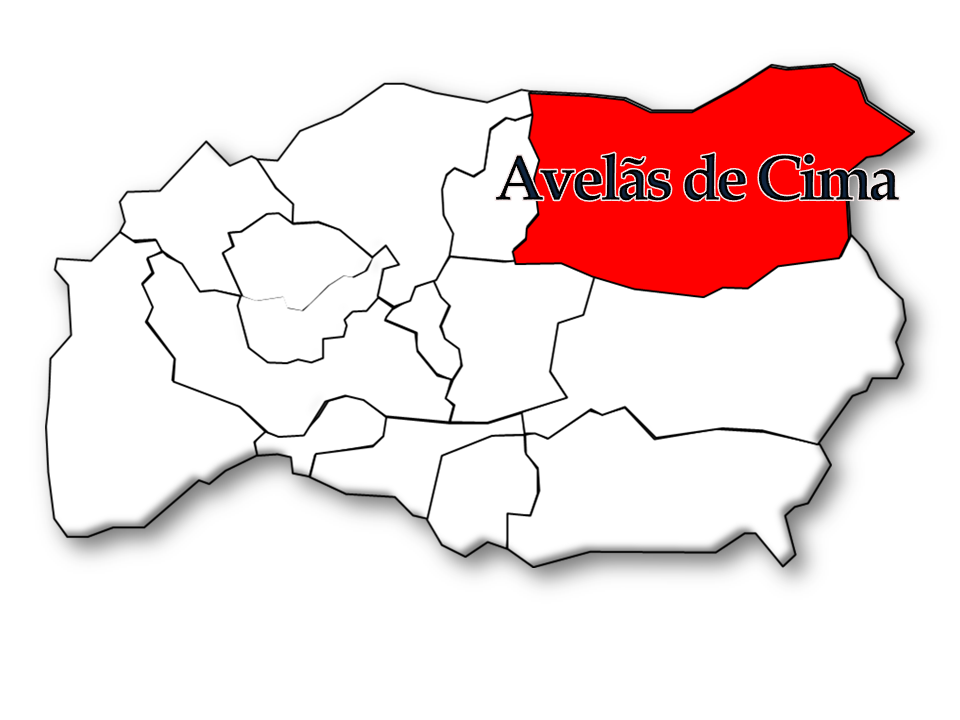
- Location in the municipality of Anadia

- Location in Portugal
- Coordinates: 40°28′51″N 8°25′15″W
- Country: Portugal
- Region: Centro
- Intermunic. comm.: Região de Aveiro
- District: Aveiro
- Municipality: Anadia

Area
  - Total: 40.58 km^{2} (15.67 sq mi)

Population (2011)
  - Total: 2,185
  - Density: 53.84/km^{2} (139.5/sq mi)
- Time zone: UTC+00:00 (WET)
  - Summer (DST): UTC+01:00 (WEST)

Avelãs de Cima is a village and a civil parish of the municipality of Anadia, Portugal. The population in 2011 was 2,185, in an area of 40.58 km^{2}.
