= Rocas do Vouga =

- Civil parish
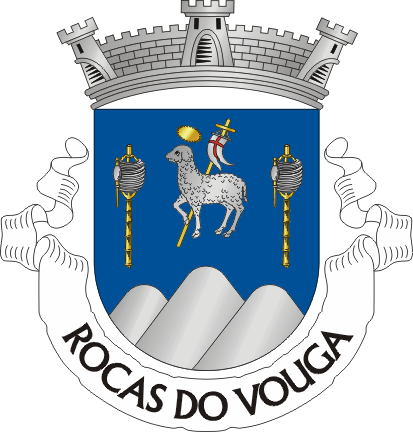
- Coat of arms

- Coordinates: 40.760°N 8.344°W
- Country: Portugal
- Region: Centro
- Intermunic. comm.: Região de Aveiro
- District: Aveiro
- Municipality: Sever do Vouga

Area
  - Total: 14.82 km^{2} (5.72 sq mi)

Population (2011)
  - Total: 1,778
  - Density: 120.0/km^{2} (310.7/sq mi)
- Time zone: UTC+00:00 (WET)
  - Summer (DST): UTC+01:00 (WEST)

Rocas do Vouga is a freguesia in Sever do Vouga, Aveiro District, Portugal. The population in 2011 was 1,778, in an area of 14.82 km^{2}.
