= Avanca =

- Civil parish
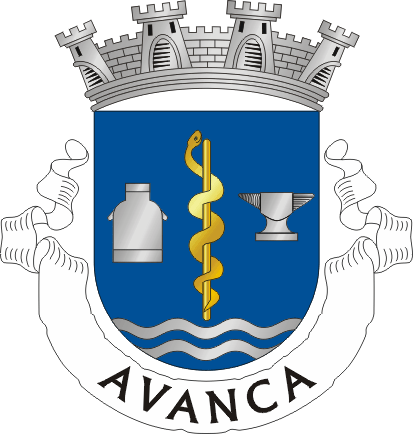
- Coat of arms

- Location in Portugal
- Coordinates: 40.807°N 8.573°W
- Country: Portugal
- Region: Centro
- Intermunic. comm.: Região de Aveiro
- District: Aveiro
- Municipality: Aveiro

Area
  - Total: 21.07 km^{2} (8.14 sq mi)

Population (2011)
  - Total: 6,189
  - Density: 290/km^{2} (760/sq mi)
- Time zone: UTC+00:00 (WET)
  - Summer (DST): UTC+01:00 (WEST)
- Postal code: 3860
- Area code: 234
- Patron: Santa Marinha
- Website: http://www.jf-avanca.pt/

Avanca is a civil parish in the municipality of Estarreja, in the central subregion of Baixo Vouga. The population in 2011 was 6,189, in an area of 21.07 km^{2}.

== History ==
During the mid 18th century Avanca was divided in three separate municipalities: Estarreja, Feira and Bemposta, all part of the province of Beira Baixa and the comarca of Esgueira.

== Geography ==
The parish of Avanca is situated in the municipality of Estarreja, in the historic district of Aveiro. One of the seven parishes of this municipality, it occupied a territory of 2300 hectares, an area almost rectangular in shape.

The territory is bisected by the Linha Norte railway, whose segment (the Aveiro-Porto link) was inaugurated on 7 July 1865. Almost parallel to this line is the Estrada Nacional E.N.109 (Porto-Aveiro-Figueira da Foz) fronting the parochial church, and its churchyard, is 42 kilometres (26 mi) from Porto and 23 kilometres (14 mi) from Aveiro. Closer to this is Ovar, 6 kilometres (3.7 mi), and the town of Estarreja, 5 kilometres (3.1 mi), with accesses by the A29 and A1, to the north of the parish.

== Architecture ==
=== Civic ===
- Manorhouse of Quinta da Aldeia (Portuguese: Casa da Quinta da Aldeia em Avanca), the manorhouse, constructed in the 18th century, is a simple, two-story building in the ornate Baroque style, that includes an estate gate with grande flourish;
- Residence of Congosta (Portuguese: Casa da Areia/Casa de São Bernardo/Casa da Congosta), originally this building was the chapel (now alongside the residence), constructed by ordinance captain Diogo Tavares de Resende, and completed in 1737 (from the chapel inscription). Annual masses in honour of the patron saint, Saint Bernard, were instituted on 20 August 1748, by pilgrims, but abandoned after 1922, when Domingos Libório de Lima e Lemos, the then property owner, moved to this site, constructing the annex residence, and forcing the parishioners to construct a new chapel to the invocation of Santa Luzia;
- Residence of São José do Outeiro de Paredes (Portuguese: Casa do Outeiro e Capela / Casa de São José do Outeiro de Paredes e Capela), this estate house was constructed at the beginning of the 19th century, and conceded to the Morgados do Outeiro; Manuel Lourenço de Sá Pereira Melo Valente (death in 1810) was likely the original benefactor, which was later continued by his nephew, João de Resende Valente de Sá Abreu Freire (first Morgado do Outeiro), who was buried in the parochial church upon his death (in 1810, since the chapel constructed alongside the residence was not completed at the time of his death), while the second and third morgados were buried in the chapel onsite;
- Residence of Nossa Senhora do Carmo do Mato (Portuguese: Casa do Mato e Capela de Nossa Senhora do Carmo do Mato), the residence was built by Brígida Joana Tavares de Resende Valente, and ordinance captain Manuel Pereira Antão, some time around 1714 or 1716. The chapel's ecclesiastical coat-of-arms was conceded to João Caetano Pereira Valente, their descendant on 27 April 1776; the chapel façade and residence's gate retain many of the important decorative aspects of the original architectural characteristics;

=== Religious ===
- Chapel of Santo André (Portuguese: Capela de Santo André), the simple Mannerist chapel with one nave, was constructed in the 17th century, now situated on unleveled ground along Rua Duarte de Oliveira;
- Chapel of Santo António (Portuguese: Capela de Santo António), this chapel was reconstructed in 1626, with several upgrades during the 19th century, including redesign and the installation of new retables. The space is highlighted by a five-panel framed ceiling of wood, elevated altar and retables, and the wooden pulpit and staircase (to the left of the altar), as well as a small high-choir and staircase at the entrance;
- Chapel of São Francisco (Portuguese: Capela de São Francisco), ordered built in 1736 by Father Manuel de São João Baptista, deacon and abbey of São João de Ver (his real name was Manuel Cabral Soeiro), it is highlighted by a square structure alongside lateral body, with dome and pinnacles;
- Chapel of São Salvador (Portuguese: Capela de São Salvador), based on a 17th-century chapel, the building was reformed during the 20th century;

== Sport ==
- A.A. Avanca: District Side football club

Artística de Avanca

== Notable citizens ==
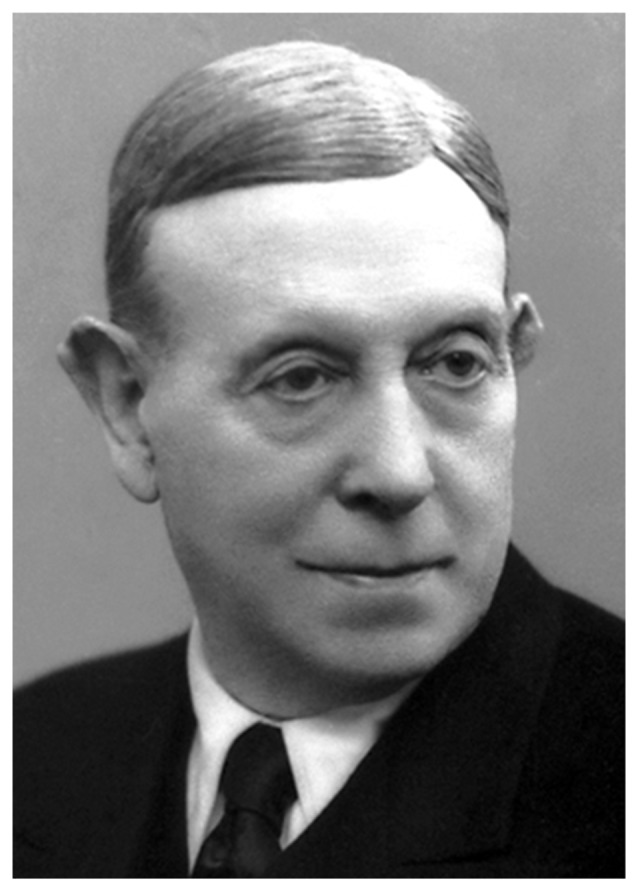
Portrait of Egas Moniz, co-developer of lobotomy

- Egas Moniz (29 November 1874 – 13 December 1955), surgeon, politician and Nobel Prize recipient (along with Walter Rudolf Hess) for the development of leucotomy.
