= Cedrim e Paradela =

- Civil parish
- Coordinates: 40.712°N 8.339°W
- Country: Portugal
- Region: Centro
- Intermunic. comm.: Região de Aveiro
- District: Aveiro
- Municipality: Sever do Vouga

Area
  - Total: 18.37 km^{2} (7.09 sq mi)

Population (2011)
  - Total: 1,554
  - Density: 85/km^{2} (220/sq mi)
- Time zone: UTC+00:00 (WET)
  - Summer (DST): UTC+01:00 (WEST)

Cedrim e Paradela (Portuguese: União de Freguesia de Cedrim e Paradela) is a parish in Sever do Vouga, Aveiro District, Portugal. The population in 2011 was 1,554, in an area of 18.37 km^{2}.
