= Silva Escura e Dornelas =

- Civil parish
- Coordinates: 40.758°N 8.390°W
- Country: Portugal
- Region: Centro
- Intermunic. comm.: Região de Aveiro
- District: Aveiro
- Municipality: Sever do Vouga

Area
  - Total: 24.19 km^{2} (9.34 sq mi)

Population (2011)
  - Total: 2,318
  - Density: 96/km^{2} (250/sq mi)
- Time zone: UTC+00:00 (WET)
  - Summer (DST): UTC+01:00 (WEST)

Silva Escura e Dornelas (Portuguese: União de Freguesias de Silva Escura e Dornelas) is a parish in Sever do Vouga, Aveiro District, Portugal. The population in 2011 was 2,318, in an area of 24.19 km^{2}.
