= Parada de Cima =

Coordinates: 40°28′N 8°41′W

Parada de Cima is a hamlet in the parish of Fonte de Angeão, whose municipality is Vagos, district of Aveiro (Portugal).
