= Sever do Vouga (freguesia) =

- Civil parish
- Coordinates: 40.733°N 8.371°W
- Country: Portugal
- Region: Centro
- Intermunic. comm.: Região de Aveiro
- District: Aveiro
- Municipality: Sever do Vouga

Area
  - Total: 11.58 km^{2} (4.47 sq mi)

Population (2011)
  - Total: 2,777
  - Density: 239.8/km^{2} (621.1/sq mi)
- Time zone: UTC+00:00 (WET)
  - Summer (DST): UTC+01:00 (WEST)

Sever do Vouga is a freguesia in Sever do Vouga, Aveiro District, Portugal. The population in 2011 was 2,777, in an area of 11.58 km^{2}.
