= Vacus =

Vacus may refer to:

- Vagos, a town in Portugal
- Acoma Pueblo, a village and tribe in New Mexico
