= Levira Distillery =

Portuguese distillery founded in 1923

- Native name: Destilaria Levira
- Company type: Private
- Industry: Distilled beverages
- Founded: 1923
- Headquarters: São Lourenço do Bairro, Anadia, Portugal
- Area served: International
- Products: Wine spirits, brandies, aged brandies, distilled alcohol, grape-seed oil, avocado oil
- Website: destilarialevira.com

Levira Distillery (Destilaria Levira) is a distillery in São Lourenço do Bairro, Anadia, Portugal, founded in 1923.

According to Público, Levira is one of the country's largest distilleries.

Early in the COVID-19 pandemic, Levira partnered with Super Bock to make around 14,000 litres (3,700 US gal) of hand sanitizer from 56,000 litres (15,000 US gal) of alcohol used in beer.

In 2023, the distillery amassed a large quantity of wine in storage due to a European wine surplus. Inflation increased prices on food and drinks and consumers were drinking less wine both in Portugal and in the countries it typically exports to. This, combined with a productive grape harvest, led to increased storage.

On 10 September 2023, a "structural failure" in a storage tank of red wine caused it to collapse. The force of its contents spilled out, knocking over a second tank and resulting in about 2,200,000 litres (580,000 US gal) of wine flowing down Rua de Cima in the village of São Lourenço do Bairro. As of the following day, though the road and at least one basement flooded, there were no injuries. Local officials issued an environmental warning out of concern that the wine could contaminate the Certima River. The local fire department closed access to the road and tried to divert the wine away from the river into a field, which Levira then began to dredge. The distillery issued a statement taking responsibility and committing to clean it up. Clips of the incident went viral on social media.
