= Vila Chã =

Vila Chã may refer to the following places in Portugal:

- Vila Chã (Alijó), a civil parish in the municipality of Alijó
- Vila Chã (Esposende), a civil parish in the municipality of Esposende
- Vila Chã (Fornos de Algodres), a parish in the municipality of Fornos de Algodres
- Vila Chã (Vale de Cambra), a parish in the municipality of Vale de Cambra
- Vila Chã (Vila do Conde), a parish in the municipality of Vila do Conde
- Santiago de Vila Chã (Ponte da Barca), a civil parish in the municipality of Ponta da Barca
- São João Baptista de Vila Chã (Ponta da Barca), a parish in the municipality of Ponta da Barca
- Vila Chã da Beira (Tarouca), a civil parish in the municipality of Tarouca
- Vila Chã de Braciosa (Miranda do Douro), a civil parish in the municipality of Miranda do Douro
- Vila Chã de Ourique (Cartaxo), a civil parish in the municipality of Cartaxo
- Vila Chã de Sá (Viseu), a civil parish in the municipality of Viseu
- Vila Chã da Beira (Amarante), a civil parish in the municipality of Amarante
