= 2024 in dance sports =

This article lists the dance sports events for 2024.

- For Full 2024 WDSF Events calendar here.

== Breaking ==
=== Major events ===
- August 9–10: 2024 Summer Olympics in (France) Paris
- December 7: 2024 Red Bull BC One World Final in (Brazil) Rio de Janeiro

== Cheerleading ==
=== World & Continental Championships ===
- April 24–26: 2024 Junior World & World Cheerleading Championships (National Teams) in (United States) Orlando
- April 26–29: 2024 IASF Worlds (Club) in (United States) Orlando
- June 28–30: 2024 ICU European Cheerleading Championships (Club) in (Norway) Oslofjord
- September 13–15: 2024 Asian Cheerleading Championships (National Teams) in (Indonesia) Bali
- September 21–22: 2024 African Cheerleading Championships (National Teams) in (South Africa) Cape Town
- September 27–29: 2024 Pan-American Cheerleading Championships (National Teams) in (Canada) Ottawa
- September 27–29: 2024 Copa Americana Cheerleading Championships (Club) in (Canada) Ottawa
- November 22–24: 2024 ICU Cheerleading World Cup (Club) in (South Korea) Seoul

== Dance sport ==
=== 2024 WDSF Dance sport World Championships ===
- March 29: Choreographic Latin WC in (Spain) Cambrils
- April 27: WC Standard U-21 in (China) Wuhan
- May 31: WC Standard Senior III in (Germany) Bremen
- July 17–19: WC Latin Junior II, Standard Youth & Latin Adult in (China) Wuxi
- July 26: WC Standard Senior IV in (Austria) Vienna
- August 31: WC Show Dance Latin Adult in (Bulgaria) Burgas
- September 14: WC Standard Junior II in (Romania) Timișoara
- September 17–19: WC Ten Dance Junior II & Standard Senior I in (Slovakia) Košice
- October 11–13: WC Standard Senior II & Ten Dance Senior I in (Netherlands) Rotterdam
- October 27: WC Ten Dance Senior II in (Portugal) Vagos
- November 1–2: WC Ten Dance Senior U-21 & Latin Senior III in (Spain) Platja d'Aro
- November 9: WC Latin Senior I in (Germany) Dresden
- November 9: WC Ten Dance Youth in (Portugal) Vila Nova de Famalicão
- November 16: WC Latin U-21 in (Latvia) Salaspils
- November 29–30: WC Salsa Adult & Bachata Adult in (Spain) Guadalajara
- November 29 - December 1: WC Solo Latin Solo Female Junior II, Adult & Youth in (Bosnia and Herzegovina) Sarajevo
- December 16: WC Formation Latin Adult in (Austria) Vienna

=== 2024 World Open ===
- January 6: WO #1 in (Spain) Madrid
  - Latin winners: (France) Charles-Guillaume Schmitt & Elena Salikhova
  - Standard winners: (Moldova) Alexey Glukhov & Anastasia Glazunova
- January 21: WO #2 in (Italy) Lazise
  - Latin winners: (France) Charles-Guillaume Schmitt & Elena Salikhova
  - Standard winners: (Lithuania) Marco Bodini & Kristina Charitonovaite
- January 27: WO #3 in (Germany) Pforzheim
  - Latin winners: (Spain) Guillem Pascual & Diandra-Aniela Illes
- February 10–11: WO #4 in (Belgium) Antwerp
  - Latin winners: (Denmark) Malthe Brinch Rohde & Sandra Sorensen
  - Standard winners: (Lithuania) Marco Bodini & Kristina Charitonovaite
- April 14: WO #5 in (South Korea) Seoul
- April 27–28: WO #6 in (China) Wuhan
- June 1: WO #7 in (Germany) Bremen
- July 6–7: WO #8 in (Germany) Wuppertal
- September 21–22: WO #9 in (Czech Republic) Brno
- September 28: WO #10 in (Slovakia) Košice
- October 19–20: WO #11 in (Poland) Elbląg
- October 27: WO #12 in (Portugal) Vagos
- November 2: WO #13 in (Romania) Sibiu

=== 2024 GrandSlam ===
- May 4 & 5: GS #1 in (Spain) Calvià
- July 20 & 21: GS #2 in (China) Wuxi
- August 15–17: GS #3 in (Germany) Stuttgart
- October 5 & 6: GS #4 in (Serbia) Belgrade
- December 14 & 15: GS #5 in (China) Shanghai
