= Baixo Vouga =

Coordinates: 40°37′N 8°38′W

Map showing the location of the Baixo Vouga subregion

Baixo Vouga (Portuguese pronunciation: [ˌbajʃu ˈvoɣɐ]) is a former Portuguese subregion integrated in the Centro Region. It was abolished at the January 2015 NUTS 3 revision. It was centered on the city of Aveiro. Other major cities included Águeda, Ílhavo and Ovar. The subregion covered an area of 1,807 km^{2} and had a population of 394,393 inhabitants (2005) for an overall density of 218 inhabitants/km^{2}. It was crossed from east to west by the Vouga River.

== Economy ==
Baixo Vouga is a subregion of heavy industry; its exports include paper, ceramics, chemicals, automobiles, and food. Tourism, education (including the University of Aveiro) and health services are also very developed.

== Municipalities ==
The municipalities (Concelhos) of Baixo Vouga ("Lower Vouga" river valley) are:

- Águeda
- Albergaria-a-Velha
- Anadia
- Aveiro
- Estarreja
- Ílhavo
- Murtosa
- Oliveira do Bairro
- Ovar
- Sever do Vouga
- Vagos

Note: Mealhada used to be part of Baixo Vouga. It is now part of Baixo Mondego / Regiao de Coimbra.

== Transport ==
Several motorways, tollways (auto-estradas)[A 1;A 25]. Main train stations: Aveiro (main hub) Ovar, Esmoriz, Pampilhosa, Mealhada, Estarreja, O.do Bairro, Mogofores. Other stations: Avanca, Oia, Paraimo/Sangalhos, Quintas, Luso. Principal airfield: Aveiro/Sao Jacinto [PVA]. Chief harbor: Porto de Aveiro {Ilhavo/Aveiro}.
