= Salreu =

- Civil parish
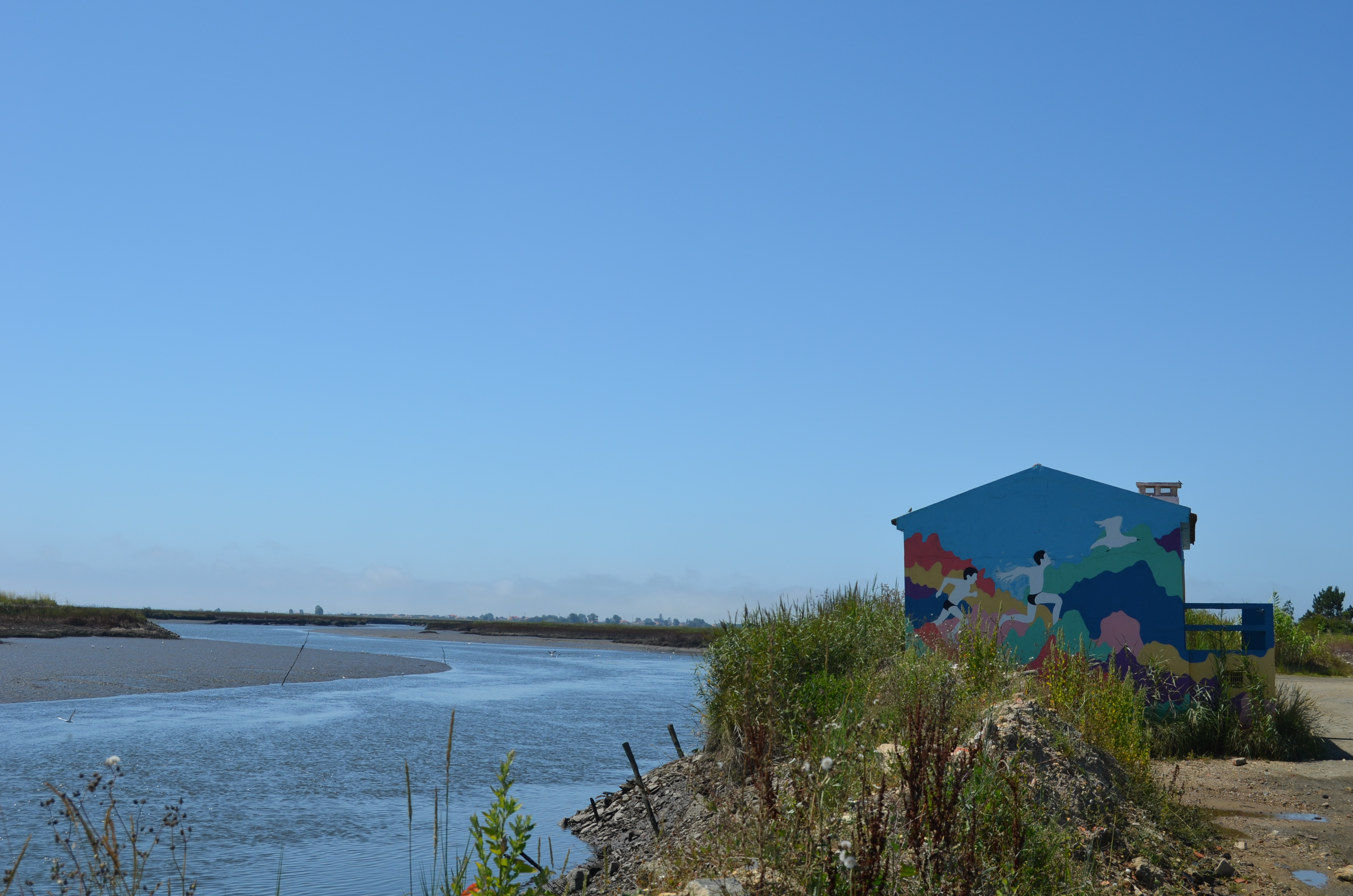

- Location in Portugal
- Coordinates: 40°44′14″N 8°33′39″W
- Country: Portugal
- Region: Centro
- Intermunic. comm.: Região de Aveiro
- District: Aveiro
- Municipality: Estarreja

Area
  - Total: 16.2 km^{2} (6.3 sq mi)

Population (2011)
  - Total: 4,153
  - Density: 256/km^{2} (664/sq mi)
- Time zone: UTC+00:00 (WET)
  - Summer (DST): UTC+01:00 (WEST)

Salreu is a village and a civil parish of the municipality of Estarreja, Portugal. The population in 2011 was 4,153, in an area of 16.2 km^{2}.
