= Vale de Cambra =

- Municipality
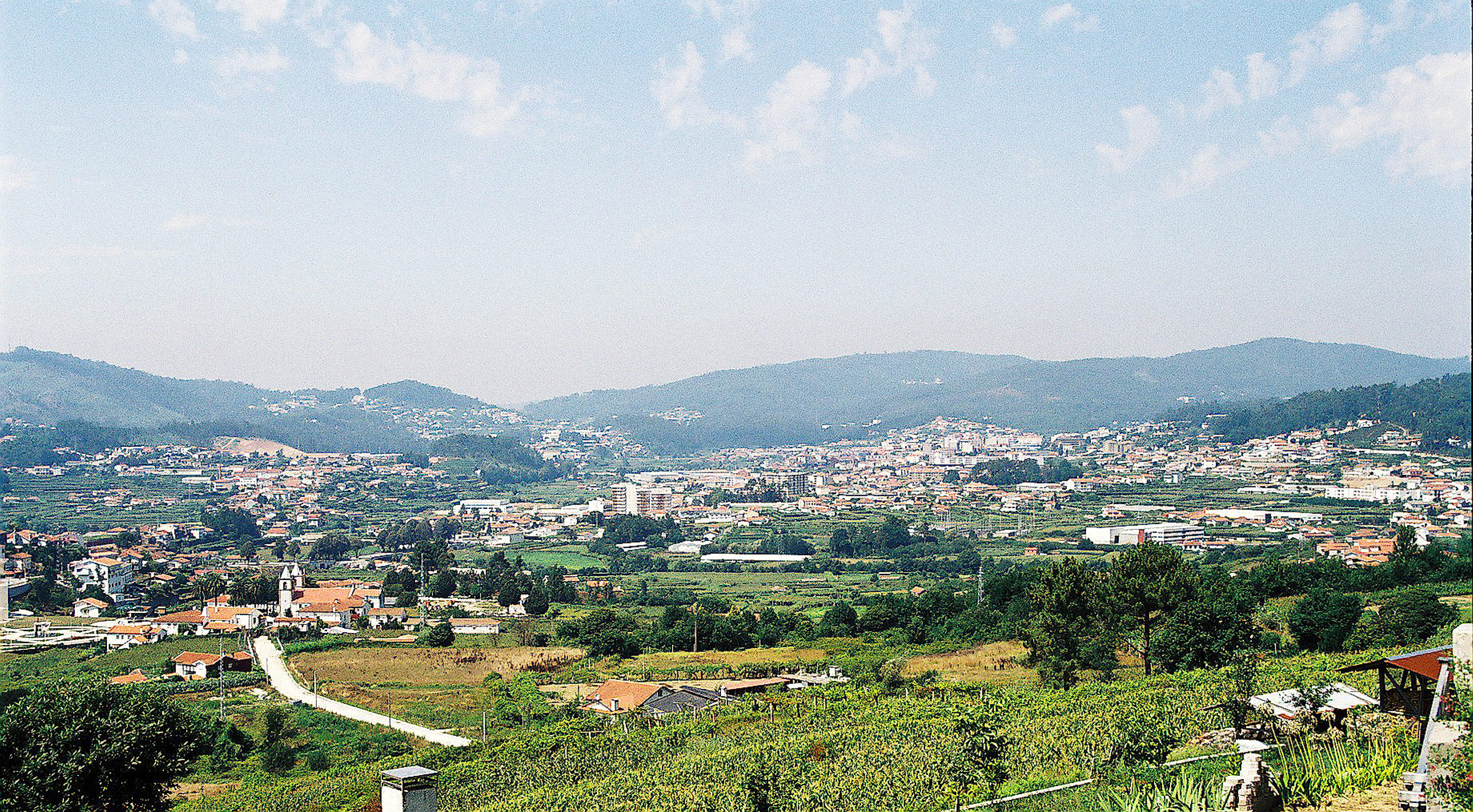

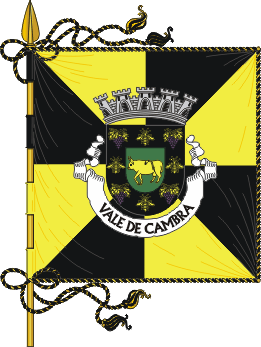
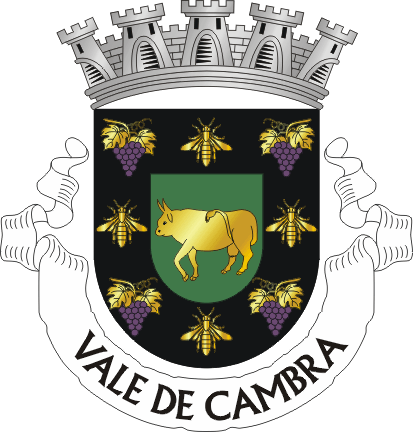
- Flag Coat of arms
- Interactive map of Vale de Cambra
- Coordinates: 40°51′N 8°24′W
- Country: Portugal
- Region: Norte
- Metropolitan area: Porto
- District: Aveiro
- Parishes: 7

Government
  - President: André Martins da Silva (CDS–PP)

Area
  - Total: 147.33 km^{2} (56.88 sq mi)

Population (2011)
  - Total: 22,864
  - Density: 155.19/km^{2} (401.94/sq mi)
- Time zone: UTC+00:00 (WET)
  - Summer (DST): UTC+01:00 (WEST)
- Website: http://www.cm-valedecambra.pt

Vale de Cambra (Portuguese pronunciation: [ˈval(ɨ) ðɨ ˈkɐ̃bɾɐ]; Proto-Celtic: *Cambra) is a city and a municipality in Portugal. The population in 2011 was 22,864, in an area of 147.33 km^{2} (56.88 sq mi). It had 21,440 electors in 2006. The city itself has about 4,100 inhabitants and is located in the Vila Chã, Codal e Vila Cova de Perrinho parish.

The municipality is located in the District of Aveiro, in Norte region and Entre Douro & Vouga subregion. It is now one of the municipalities of the Greater Metropolitan Area of Porto.

The present Mayor is André Agostinho Martins da Silva, elected by the CDS – People's Party. The municipal holiday is June 13.

== Historical List of Mayors (1928-2026) ==
=== Mayors from 1928 to 1974 (Military Dictatorship and Estado Novo) ===
- 1928–1937: Domingos de Almeida Brandão
- 1937–1943: Armindo Ferreira de Matos
- 1944: António Soares Coelho
- 1944–1945: António Joaquim Borges Ferreira
- 1945–1947: António Bernardo Coelho
- 1947–1954: Armindo Ferreira de Matos
- 1954–1962: António Henriques Tavares de Almeida
- 1962–1966: Rogério Martins Fernando
- 1966–1970: António José Tavares Prado de Castro
- 1970–1974: Delmiro Henriques de Almeida

=== Mayors during the democratic transition (1974–1976) ===
- 1974–1975: Adão Pinho da Cruz
- 1975–1976: Manuel de Almeida Campos

=== Democratically elected mayors (1976–2026) ===
- 1976–1979: Bernardo Coelho Pinho
- 1979–1981: Álvaro Pinho da Costa Leite
- 1981–1982: José Tavares
- 1982–1985: António José de Oliveira Fonseca
- 1985–1993: Luís Gonçalo Bastos de Pinho
- 1993–2001: António José de Oliveira Fonseca
- 2001–2004: Eduardo Manuel Martins Coelho
- 2004–2013: José António Bastos da Silva
- 2013–2025: José Alberto Freitas Soares Pinheiro e Silva
- 2025–present: André Agostinho Martins da Silva

== Climate ==
Climate data for Vale de Cambra, 1991-2020, altitude: 306 m (1,004 ft)
Month	Jan	Feb	Mar	Apr	May	Jun	Jul	Aug	Sep	Oct	Nov	Dec	Year
Record high °C (°F)	20.5 (68.9)	23.9 (75.0)	28.5 (83.3)	30.1 (86.2)	32.8 (91.0)	36.1 (97.0)	39.5 (103.1)	38.6 (101.5)	34.1 (93.4)	30.9 (87.6)	24.5 (76.1)	21.4 (70.5)	39.5 (103.1)
Daily mean °C (°F)	8.9 (48.0)	9.8 (49.6)	11.8 (53.2)	13.1 (55.6)	15.6 (60.1)	18.4 (65.1)	20.4 (68.7)	20.7 (69.3)	18.9 (66.0)	15.9 (60.6)	12.0 (53.6)	9.7 (49.5)	14.6 (58.3)
Average precipitation mm (inches)	196.2 (7.72)	122.0 (4.80)	137.3 (5.41)	143.6 (5.65)	113.4 (4.46)	48.7 (1.92)	21.9 (0.86)	35.0 (1.38)	78.4 (3.09)	187.6 (7.39)	204.7 (8.06)	216.5 (8.52)	1,505.3 (59.26)
Source: Portuguese Environment Agency

== Demographics ==
Historical population

Year	Pop.	±%
1864	10,188	—
1878	11,495	+12.8%
1890	11,358	−1.2%
1900	12,264	+8.0%
1911	13,290	+8.4%
1920	13,920	+4.7%
1930	15,745	+13.1%
1940	17,437	+10.7%

Year	Pop.	±%
1950	19,193	+10.1%
1960	20,404	+6.3%
1970	21,430	+5.0%
1981	24,224	+13.0%
1991	24,537	+1.3%
2001	24,798	+1.1%
2011	22,864	−7.8%
2021	21,269	−7.0%

Source: INE

== Parishes ==
Administratively, the municipality is divided into 7 civil parishes (freguesias):

- Arões
- Cepelos
- Junqueira
- Macieira de Cambra
- Roge
- São Pedro de Castelões
- Vila Chã

== Environment ==
The mountains of Freita and Arada: Serra da Freita & Serra da Arada

These mountains are a part to the European Nature 2000

Arouca Geopark

== Notable people ==
- Rui Filipe (1968–1994), Portuguese footballer with 222 club caps and 6 for Portugal
- João Paulo Fernandes (born 1984), Portuguese boccia player and Paralympic champion.

== See also ==
- Hóquei Académico de Cambra, a rink hockey club.
