= Sidónio Muralha =

Portuguese author (1920–1982)

- Pedro Sidónio de Araújo Muralha
- Born: 29 July 1920; Lisbon, Portugal
- Died: 8 December 1982 (aged 62); Curitiba, Brazil
- Occupations: Writer, poet
- Children: 2
- Relatives: Pedro Muralha (father)
- Writing career
- Language: Portuguese
- Notable works: Bichos, bichinhos e bicharocos

Sidónio Muralha (Lisbon, 29 July 1920 – Curitiba, 8 December 1982) was a Portuguese writer. He wrote poetry, prose (fiction and essays), as well as children's literature, the genre in which he became most renowned.

He also pursued a professional career as a manager and international sales specialist.

== Biography ==
Pedro Sidónio de Araújo Muralha was born on 29 July 1920 in Lisbon. He was the son of Beatriz Araújo and journalist Pedro Muralha. He spent his childhood in the Madragoa neighbourhood.

At a very young age, he contributed to literary magazines and publications somewhat associated with what would later become Portuguese neorealism (such as Mocidade Académica and Solução, and, a decade later, Vértice).

In 1941, encouraged by Bento de Jesus Caraça, he published his first book of poetry: Beco. He joined the neorealist movement and the Lisbon-based literary groups associated with this movement, becoming one of its leading figures alongside Armindo Rodrigues, Joaquim Namorado, Fernando Namora and Mário Dionísio. With his work Passagem de Nível (Coimbra, 1942), he became part of the so-called Novo Cancioneiro, a collection that brought together poetry by several authors who opposed the Salazar regime.

In 1943, he arrived in the Belgian Congo in voluntary exile, having departed with Alexandre Cabral. In that country, he eventually became managing director of Unilever International (in Lisbon, Sidónio Muralha had studied Economic and Financial Sciences; he later studied business administration at the University of Louvain, Belgium). In 1944, he married Maria Fernanda d’Almeida by proxy (she was in Portugal, while he was in the Congo). The couple had four children: Alexandre, Beatriz, José Ricardo and Mário Jorge. At Christmas 1949, Sidónio returned to Portugal, publishing that year the second edition of Beco – Passagem de Nível in a combined volume and, the following year, one of the major works of his poetic career: Companheira dos Homens. Both self-published editions featured cover illustrations by painter Júlio Pomar, with whom he maintained a lasting friendship. Also in 1950, with illustrations by Júlio Pomar and music by Francine Benoit, he published his first book of poems for children: Bichos, Bichinhos e Bicharocos.

In 1960, in light of the turbulent social developments in the Belgian Congo, the Muralha family returned to Europe, settling in Brussels for two years. During this period, he continued working for Unilever, travelling constantly around the world. Muralha undertook professional assignments and worked in Bafatá (Guinea-Bissau), Ostend, Dakar, London and Paris.

In the early 1960s, Sidónio Muralha arrived in Brazil, the country he would adopt as his home for the remainder of his life. He initially settled with his family in São Paulo. There, together with writer Fernando Correia da Silva and painter Fernando Lemos (both Portuguese), he founded Editora Giroflé, which would revolutionise children's publishing and establish a new standard for books aimed at young readers. Although the publishing project ultimately did not succeed, Muralha continued publishing children's books, including 1962 A Televisão da Bicharada (winner of the First São Paulo Book Biennial Award in 1963), and works for adults, such as Esse Congo que foi Belga (1969). Alongside his literary career, he continued working for Unilever in Brazil, providing financial consultancy and delivering lectures throughout the country.

In the 1970s, Sidónio Muralha returned to Portugal, initially to promote his poetry anthology Poemas (1971), and later to celebrate the "liberated Portugal" following the Carnation Revolution. In 1977, he received the "Environmental Literature Award for Children's Literature" (Prémio Meio Ambiente na Literatura Infantil) for his book Valéria e Vida, illustrated by Fernando Lemos, which marked the beginning of a fruitful partnership with Livros Horizonte. His wife, Maria Fernanda d’Almeida Muralha, died in 1978. In 1979, Sidónio Muralha received another children's literature award, the "Portugal 79 Award – Children's Book" (Prémio Portugal 79 – Livro para Crianças), for his work Helena e a Cotovia. In the same year, he married obstetrician Helen Butler Muralha, with whom he subsequently lived in Curitiba.

On 8 December 1982, the poet and writer Sidónio Muralha died in Curitiba, Paraná. Sidónio Muralha was one of the pioneers of Portuguese neorealism and an important promoter of children's literature. During his lifetime, he published 21 books of prose (short stories, novels, essays and personal accounts) and poetry for adults, as well as 15 children's books, through Portuguese and Brazilian publishers. He left three unpublished plays. He is regarded as one of the finest poets for children in the Portuguese language.

== Works ==
Between 1941 and 1982, Sidónio Muralha published an extensive body of poetry, several essays, two short-story collections and one or two autobiographical books, in addition to approximately fifteen children's literature titles. Throughout his literary career, he contributed to several publications, including Vértice, and was featured in various anthologies of both poetry and children's literature.

=== Poetry ===
- Beco, Lisbon, [Self-published], first edition, 1941. Second edition, Lisbon, 1949. [Cover vignette by Júlio Pomar, combined edition with Passagem de Nível]. Third edition, 1950.
- Passagem de Nível — Novo Cancioneiro, Coimbra, first edition, 1942. Second edition, 1949 [Cover vignette by Júlio Pomar, combined edition with Beco]. Third edition, 1949. Facsimile edition of the books in the Novo Cancioneiro collection, Lisbon: Althum Editores, Novo Cancioneiro collection, vol. 8, 2010.
- Companheira dos Homens, cover illustrated by Júlio Pomar, first edition, Lisbon: Typografia Garcia & Carvalho, 1950. Second edition, same publisher, 1950.
- Os Olhos das Crianças, layout by Maria Bonomi and Fernando Lemos, São Paulo, 1963. Second edition, edited by Helen Butler Muralha, Curitiba: Editora Lítero-Técnica, 1983.
- Quando São Paulo Só Tinha Quatro Milhões de Habitantes, cover and layout by Joaquim Guedes and Regina Dias de Aguiar, São Paulo: Gráfica Martinez, 1966.
- Poemas [Anthology of his poetic work], Porto: Editorial Inova, 1971.
- O Pássaro Ferido (poems and short-short stories), Rio de Janeiro: Editorial Nórdica, 1972.
- Poema para Beatriz, Curitiba, 1972. Poema para Beatriz / Poema per Beatrice, translated by Orietta del Bane, Lisbon: Prelo Editora, 1977 (?).
- Poemas de Abril, foreword by Alexandre Cabral, Lisbon: Prelo Editora, 1974.
- Valéria, Valéria, Curitiba, 1976.
- Com Sol e Sal, Eu Escrevo, Curitiba, 1977.
- 26 Sonetos, Lisbon: Livros Horizonte, Horizonte da Poesia collection, no. 7, 1979.
- Pátria Minha, Camões Fourth Centenary, Curitiba: Editora Lítero-Técnica, 1980.
- Um Punhado de Areia, Curitiba: Editora Lítero-Técnica, 1981.
- Cântico à Velhice [poema-cartaz], Curitiba: Editora Lítero-Técnica, 1982.
- (Posthumous anthology:) Obras Completas do Poeta [Sidónio Muralha], Lisbon: Universitária Editora, 2002.

=== Prose and miscellanea ===
- Esse Congo que foi Belga, São Paulo: Editora Brasiliense, 1969. [Chronicles, short stories, autobiography]
- O Homem Arrastado, Coimbra: Editora Atlântica, Textos Vértice collection, 1972. [Novel]
- A Caminhada – Livro de Vivências, Lisbon: Prelo Editora, O Homem no Mundo collection, 1975. [Autobiography]
- O Andarilho, Lisbon: Prelo Editora, 1975. [Short stories]
- A Mulher Submissa, Lisbon: Prelo Editora, Cacto collection, 1975. [Essay]
- As Crianças sem Ano Internacional, Curitiba, 1979. [Personal account, essay]
- Do Outro Lado da Rua, Lisbon: Ler Editora, 1982. [Short stories]

=== Children's literature ===
- Bichos, Bichinhos e Bicharocos, cover and illustrations by Júlio Pomar, with three poems set to music by Francine Benoit, Lisbon: Typografia Garcia e Carvalho, 1950. Second edition, Lisbon: Livros Horizonte, Pássaro Livre collection, no. 4, 1977. Facsimile edition of the first edition, with a foreword by João Lobo Antunes, Lisbon: Althum Editores/Centauro, 2010.
- A Televisão da Bicharada, illustrated by Fernando Lemos, São Paulo: Editora Giroflé, 1962. (...) Eighth edition, São Paulo: Nórdica, 1988. Ninth edition, illustrated by Cláudia Scatamachia, São Paulo: Global Editora, 1997.
- Um Personagem Chamado Pedrinho – A Vida Monteiro Lobato para os Alunos Lerem e os Professores Também, São Paulo: Editora Brasiliense, São Paulo, 1970. Second edition, same publisher, 1973. Third edition, Rio de Janeiro: Editorial Nórdica, 1978.
- O Companheiro, illustrations by "Nova Geração", Lisbon: Editorial Futura, 1975.
- A Amizade Bate à Porta, cover and illustrations by Tóssan, Lisbon: Editorial A Comuna, 1975.
- Valéria e a Vida, illustrations by Soares Rocha, Lisbon: Livros Horizonte, Pássaro Livre collection, no. 1, 1976. Second edition, same publisher, 1979. Third edition, illustrations by Flavio Colin, Curitiba: Edições Criar/Fundação Sidónio Muralha, 1988. [Fourth edition], illustrations by the pupils of class 8.5 at Escola Cooperativa de Vale de São Cosme, Riba de Ave: Didáxis, 2003–2004 school year. [Fifth edition], first edition, illustrations by Inês Oliveira, Vila Nova de Gaia: Gailivros, with the support of Fundação Sidónio Muralha, 2004.
- A Dança dos Pica-Paus, Rio de Janeiro: Editorial Nórdica, 1976. Second edition, 1979. Eighth edition, illustrated by Eva Furnari, São Paulo: Global Editora, 1997.
- Sete Cavalos na Berlinda, illustrations by Ana Machado, Lisbon: Plátano Editora, Plátano de Abril collection, no. 6, 1977. Second edition, same publisher, 1979. Third edition, illustrated by Márcia Széliga, São Paulo: Global Editora, 1997. [Edition containing only the short story "Sete Cavalos na Berlinda", excluding the other children's stories included in the original edition of the book.]
- Todas as Crianças da Terra, illustrated by Fernando Lemos, Lisbon: Livros Horizonte, Pássaro Livre collection, 1978. Second edition (?), illustrated by Fê, São Paulo: Global Editora, 1999. Spanish translation: Todos los Niños de la Tierra, illustrated by Fê, São Paulo: Global Editora, 1999 (?).
- Voa Pássaro, Voa, illustrated by Fernando Lemos, Lisbon: Livros Horizonte, Pássaro Livre collection, 1978.
- Catarina de Todos Nós, illustrations by Teresa Coelho Dias, Lisbon: Editora Caminho, Infantil e Juvenil collection, no. 52, 1979.
- Helena e a Cotovia, illustrated by Fernando Lemos, Lisbon: Livros Horizonte, Pássaro Livre collection, no. 15, 1979.
- Terra e Mar Vistos do Ar, illustrated by Fernando Lemos, Lisbon: Livros Horizonte, Pássaro Livre collection, no. 25, 1981.
- Film en Couleur, illustrated by Fernando Lemos, São Paulo: Digital, 1981. Second edition, Curitiba, 1982.

Posthumous works:

- O Rouxinol e Sua Namorada, illustrated by Fernando Lemos, Lisbon: Livros Horizonte, Pássaro Livre collection, no. 39, 1983.

(Texts taken from Sete Cavalos na Berlinda and published separately as children's books):

- O Trem Chegou Atrasado, second edition, illustrated by Helena Alexandrino, São Paulo: Global Editora, 1998. Third edition, illustrated by Graça Lima, Global, 2003. First reprint of the second edition in 2008.
- A Revolta dos Guarda-Chuvas, second edition, illustrated by Eva Furnari, São Paulo: Global Editora, 1998. Third reprint of the second edition in 2009.
- Os Três Cachimbos, second edition, illustrated by Priscila Martins, Global Editora, São Paulo, 1999. First reprint of the second edition in 2007.

== Sources ==
- História da Literatura Portuguesa, António José Saraiva and Óscar Lopes.
- Projecto Vercial.
- Lisbon Civil Registry Notary Office (Conservatória de Lisboa), Birth Certificate of Pedro Sidónio de Araújo Muralha, dated 29 July 1920.
- "Collection of works by Sidónio Muralha" (from the collection of José Raimundo Noras).
- "Active bibliography of Sidónio Muralha (1920–1982)", research and notes by José Raimundo Noras
