= António Egas Moniz =

Portuguese neurologist (1874–1955)

António Egas Moniz GCSE GCIB
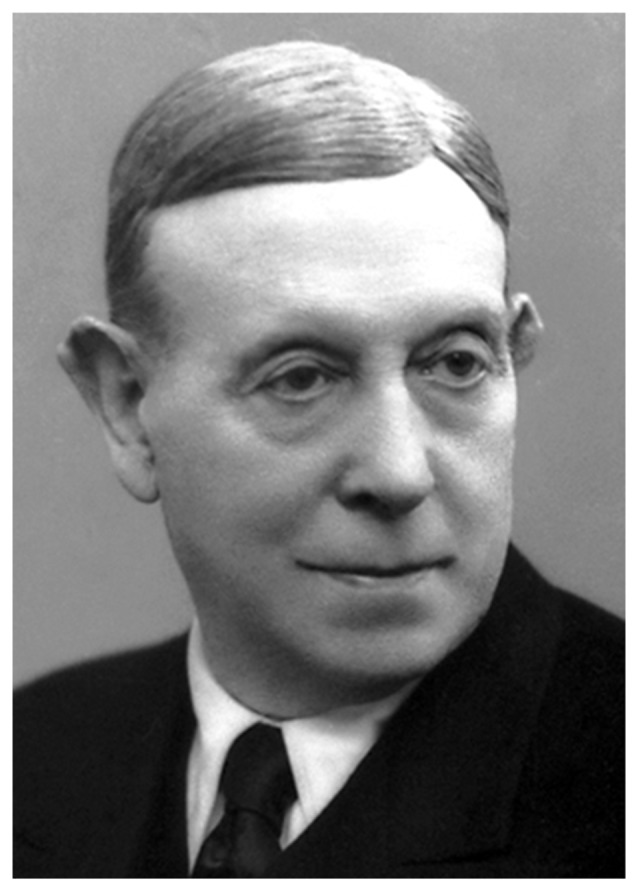
- Born: António Caetano de Abreu Freire de Resende; 29 November 1874; Avanca, Estarreja, Portugal
- Died: 13 December 1955 (aged 81); Lisbon, Portugal
- Education: University of Coimbra
- Known for: Cerebral angiography; Moniz sign; Prefrontal leucotomy
- Spouse: Elvira de Macedo Dias (m. 1901; died 1945)
- Awards: Nobel Prize in Physiology or Medicine, 1949
- Scientific career
- Fields: Neurologist
- Workplaces: University of Coimbra (1902); University of Lisbon (1921–1944)

Minister of Foreign Affairs
- In office 8 October 1918 – 30 March 1919
- Prime Minister: Sidónio Pais (de facto); João do Canto e Castro (acting); João Tamagnini Barbosa; José Relvas
- Preceded by: Joaquim do Espírito Santo Lima
- Succeeded by: Rodolfo Xavier da Silva

Ambassador of Portugal to Spain
- In office 4 March 1918 – 10 October 1918
- Nominated by: Sidónio Pais
- Preceded by: Augusto de Vasconcelos
- Succeeded by: Manuel Teixeira Gomes

António Caetano de Abreu Freire Egas Moniz (Note: European Portuguese pronunciation: [ɐ̃ˈtɔni.u kɐjˈtɐnu ð(j) ɐˈβɾew ˈfɾɐjɾ(ɨ) ˈɛɣɐʒ muˈniʃ, ɐ̃ˈtɔnju -].) GCSE GCIB (29 November 1874 – 13 December 1955), known as simply Egas Moniz, was a Portuguese neurologist and the developer of cerebral angiography. He is regarded as one of the founders of modern psychosurgery, having developed the surgical procedure leucotomy—better known today as lobotomy—for which he became the first Portuguese national to receive a Nobel Prize in 1949 (shared with Walter Rudolf Hess).

He held academic positions, wrote many medical articles and also served in several legislative and diplomatic posts in the Portuguese government. In 1911, he became professor of neurology in Lisbon until his retirement in 1944.

== Early life and training ==
Moniz was born in Avanca, Estarreja, Portugal, as António Caetano de Abreu Freire de Resende. He attended Escola do Padre José Ramos and the Jesuit-run College of Saint Fidelis. Then he studied medicine at the University of Coimbra, graduating in 1899. For the next 12 years, he served as a lecturer for basic medical courses at Coimbra. In 1911, he became a neurology professor at the University of Lisbon, where he worked until his retirement in 1944.

His uncle and godfather, Father Caetano de Pina Resende Abreu e Sá Freire, convinced his family to change his surname to Egas Moniz since he was convinced that the Resende family was descended from medieval nobleman Egas Moniz o Aio.

== Politics ==
Politics was an early passion for Moniz. He supported a republican government, diverging from his family's support for the monarchy. As a student activist, he was jailed on two separate occasions for participating in demonstrations. While serving as Dean of the Medical School at the University of Lisbon, he was arrested a third time for preventing police from settling a student-run protest.

Moniz's formal political career began when he was elected to parliament in 1900. During World War I, he was appointed the Ambassador to Spain, and afterward, he became Minister for Foreign Affairs in 1917, and in 1918 led the Portuguese delegation to the Paris Peace Conference. He retired from politics in 1919 following a duel resulting from a political quarrel.

== Research ==
=== Cerebral angiography ===
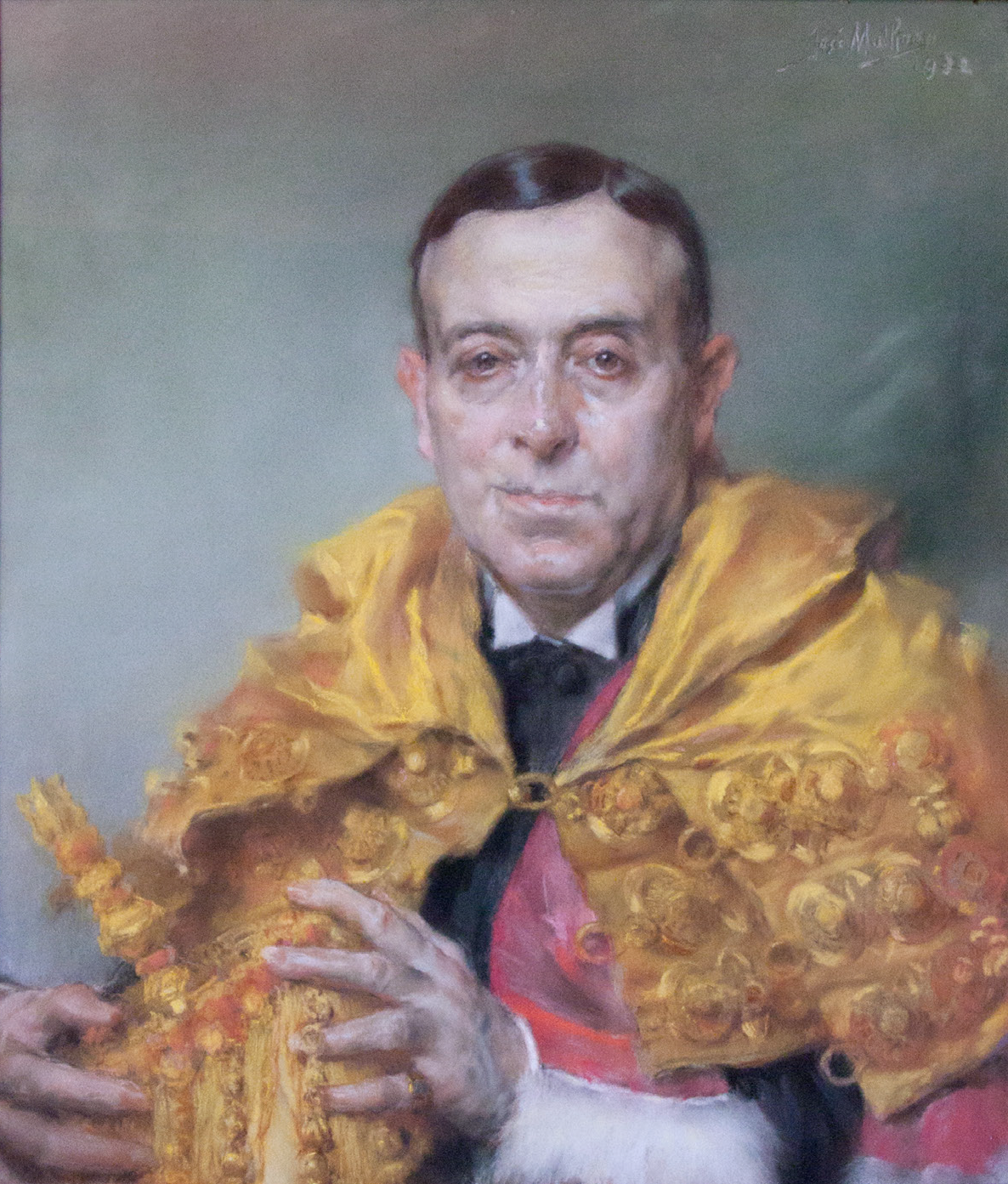
Portrait of Egas Moniz in the doctoral regalia of the University of Coimbra, 1932, by José Malhoa

In 1926, at age 51, Moniz returned to medicine full-time. He hypothesized that visualizing blood vessels in the brain with radiographic means would allow for more precise localization of brain tumors. During his experiments, Moniz injected radiopaque dyes into brain arteries and took X-rays to visualize abnormalities. In his initial tests, Moniz used strontium and lithium bromide in three patients with a suspected tumor, epilepsy, and Parkinsonism, but the experiment failed and one patient died. After a set of trials in rabbits, dogs, and cadaver heads, he achieved success using 25% sodium iodide solution on three patients, developing the first cerebral angiogram.

Moniz presented his findings at the Neurological Society in Paris and the French Academy of Medicine in 1927. He was the first person to successfully visualize the brain using radiopaque substances, as previous scientists had only visualized peripheral structures. He also contributed to the development of Thorotrast for use in the procedure and delivered many lectures and papers on the subject. His work led to the use of angiography to detect internal carotid occlusion, as well as two Nobel Prize nominations in this area.

=== Prefrontal leucotomy ===
Moniz thought that mental illness originated from abnormal neural connections in the frontal lobe. He described a "fixation of synapses," which in mental illness, was expressed as "predominant, obsessive ideas." Moniz also referenced the experiments of Yale physiologists John Farquhar Fulton and C.F. Jacobsen, who found that removing the frontal lobes of a chimpanzee made it calmer and more cooperative. In addition, Moniz observed "changes in character and personality" among soldiers who had had injuries to their frontal lobes.

Moniz hypothesized that surgically removing white matter fibers from the frontal lobe would improve a patient's mental illness. He enlisted his long-time staff member and neurosurgeon Pedro Almeida Lima to test the procedure on a group of 20 patients, mainly with schizophrenia, anxiety, and depression. The surgeries took place under general anesthesia. The first psychosurgery was performed in 1935 on a 63-year-old woman with depression, anxiety, paranoia, hallucinations, and insomnia. The patient experienced a rapid physical recovery, and two months later, a psychiatrist noted that she was calmer, less paranoid, and well oriented. In the first set of surgeries, Moniz reported a total of seven cures, seven improvements, and six unchanged cases.

Moniz never performed a surgery himself, partially because of his lack of neurosurgical training but also because he had limited use of his hands as a complication of gout. Instructed by Moniz, Lima performed ten of the first twenty surgeries by injecting absolute alcohol to destroy the frontal lobe. Later on, Moniz and Lima developed a new technique using a leucotome, a needle-like instrument with a retractable wire loop. By rotating the wire loop, they were able to surgically separate white matter fibres.

Moniz judged the results acceptable in the first 40 or so patients he treated, claiming, "Prefrontal leukotomy is a simple operation, always safe, which may prove to be an effective surgical treatment in certain cases of mental disorder." He also claimed that any behavioral and personality deterioration that may occur was outweighed by reduction in the debilitating effects of the illness. He conceded that patients who had already deteriorated from the mental illness did not benefit much. The procedure enjoyed a brief vogue, and in 1949 he received the Nobel Prize "for his discovery of the therapeutic value of leucotomy in certain psychoses."

Critics accused Moniz of understating complications, providing inadequate documentation, and not following up with patients. After his initial procedures, other physicians, such as Walter Jackson Freeman II and James W. Watts, adopted a modified technique in the United States and renamed it "lobotomy."

== Writing ==
Moniz was a prolific writer, publishing work in Portuguese literature, sexology, and two autobiographies. Upon graduating from medical school, he gained notoriety for publishing a series of controversial books, called A Vida Sexual (The Sexual Life). His other writings included biographies of Portuguese physician Pedro Hispano Portucalense and José Custódio de Faria, a monk and hypnotist. In the field of medicine, Moniz published 112 articles and 2 books on angiography alone. He also wrote on neurological war injuries, Parkinson's disease, and clinical neurology.

== Later life and death ==
In 1939, Moniz was shot multiple times by a patient with schizophrenia. (Note: It is often said that this was one of Moniz's lobotomy patients, but there seems to be no evidence for this.) He continued in private practice until 1955. Moniz died from an internal haemorrhage on 13 December 1955.

== Legacy ==
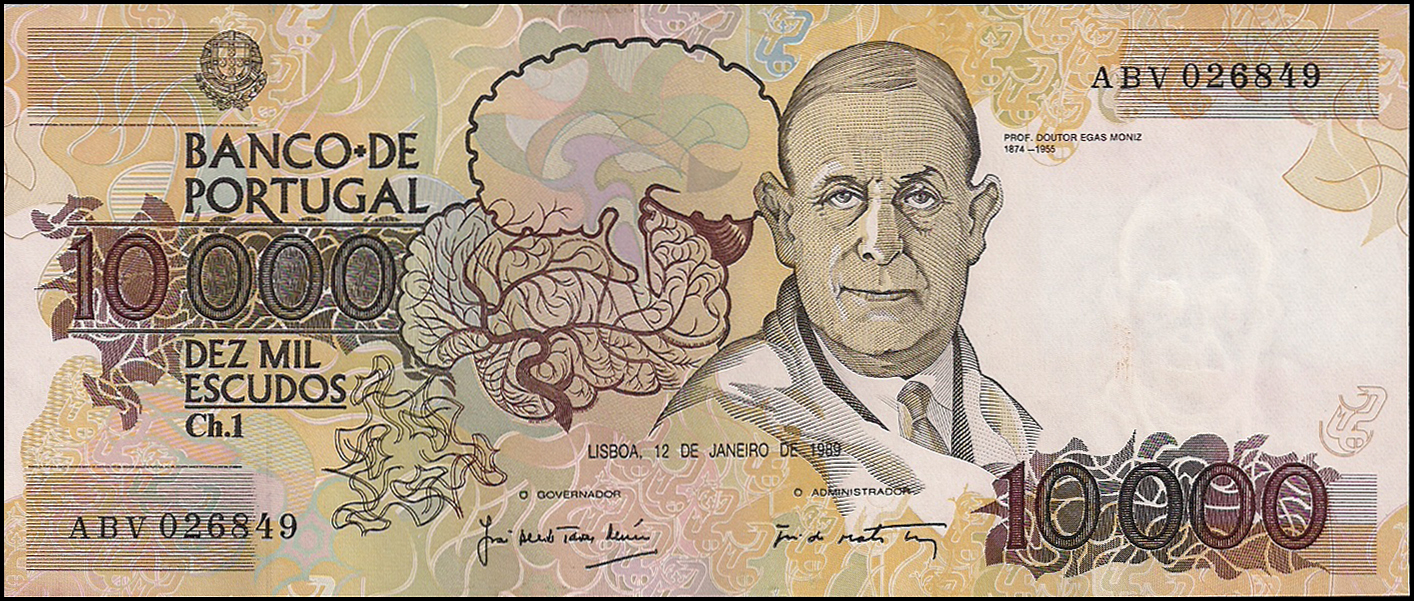
Moniz on a 1989 commemorative Portuguese escudo banknote

After Moniz's death, antipsychotic medications were developed and put into use and leucotomies fell out of favour. Moniz's legacy suffered towards the end of the 20th century, as leucotomies were then perceived overwhelmingly negatively, thought of as an outdated experimental procedure. Well-known experts, including psychologist Elliot Valenstein, and neurologist Oliver Sacks, were particularly critical of Moniz's methods and him earning the Nobel Prize.

There have been calls to rescind Moniz's Nobel Prize, especially from family members of patients who underwent leucotomies. However, others have defended Moniz for his scientific contributions, stressing the need to examine his legacy in context.

In his native Portugal, Moniz is highly regarded, being featured on commemorative banknotes and postage stamps. A statue of him stands outside the Faculty of Medicine of the University of Lisbon, and his country house in Avanca is now a museum.

In 2020, a biographical made-for-television film was produced by RTP2 titled O Ego de Egas ("The Ego of Egas"), which explores Moniz's work and motives.

== Important publications ==
According to the Nobel Prize, his more important publications are:

- Alterações anátomo-patológicas na difteria (Anatomo-pathologic changes in diphtheria), Coimbra, 1900.
- A vida sexual (fisiologia e patologia) (Physiological and pathological aspects of sex life), 19 editions, Coimbra, 1901.
- A neurologia na guerra (Neurology in war), Lisbon, 1917.
- Um ano de política (A year of politics), Lisbon, 1920.
- Júlio Diniz e a sua obra (Júlio Dinis and his works), 6 editions, Lisbon, 1924.
- O Padre Faria na história do hipnotismo (Abbé Faria in the history of hypnotism), Lisbon, 1925.
- Diagnostic des tumeurs cérébrales et épreuve de l'encéphalographie artérielle (Diagnostics of cerebral tumours and application of arterial encephalography), Paris, 1931.
- L'angiographie cérébrale, ses applications et résultats en anatomie, physiologie et clinique (Cerebral angiography, its applications and results in anatomy, physiology, and clinic), Paris, 1934.
- Tentatives opératoires dans le traitement de certaines psychoses (Tentative methods in the treatment of certain psychoses), Paris, 1936.
- La leucotomie préfrontale. Traitement chirurgical de certaines psychoses (Prefrontal leucotomy. Surgical treatment of certain psychoses), Turin, 1937.
- Clinica dell'angiografia cerebrale (Clinical cerebral angiography), Turin, 1938.
- Die cerebrale Arteriographie und Phlebographie (Cerebral arteriography and phlebography), Berlin, 1940.
- Ao lado da medicina (On the side of medicine), Lisbon, 1940.
- Trombosis y otras obstrucciones de las carótidas (Thrombosis and other obstructions of the carotids), Barcelona, 1941.
- História das cartas de jogar (History of playing-cards), Lisbon, 1942.
- Como cheguei a realizar a leucotomia pré-frontal (How I came to perform prefrontal leucotomy), Lisbon, 1948.
- Die präfrontale Leukotomie (Prefrontal leucotomy), Archiv für Psychiatrie und Nervenkrankheiten, 1949.

== Distinctions ==
=== National orders ===
- Grand Cross of the Order of Saint James of the Sword (3 March 1945)
- Grand Cross of the Order of Instruction and of Benefaction (5 October 1928)

=== Foreign orders ===
- Commander of the Legion of Honour (France)
- Grand Officer of the Order of the Crown of Italy (Italy)
- Grand Cross of the Order of Isabella the Catholic (Spain)

== See also ==
- Angiography
- Pulmonary angiography
- Neuroimaging
