= Vila Chã (Vale de Cambra) =

- Civil parish
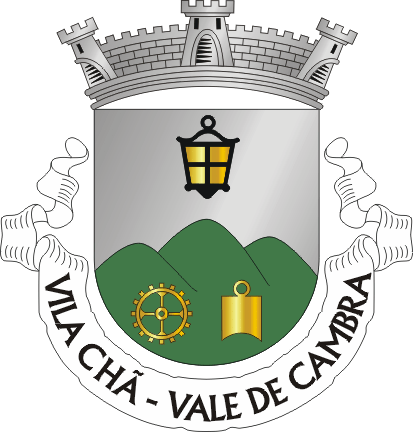
- Flag

- Location in Portugal
- Coordinates: 41.51°N 8.24°W
- Country: Portugal
- Region: Norte
- Metropolitan area: Porto
- District: Aveiro
- Municipality: Vale de Cambra

Area
  - Total: 6.86 km^{2} (2.65 sq mi)

Population (2001)
  - Total: 4,133
  - Density: 600/km^{2} (1,600/sq mi)
- Time zone: UTC+00:00 (WET)
  - Summer (DST): UTC+01:00 (WEST)

Vila Chã is a civil parish (freguesia) in the Portuguese municipality of Vale de Cambra with a population of 4,133 (2001).
