= Pardilhó =

- Civil parish
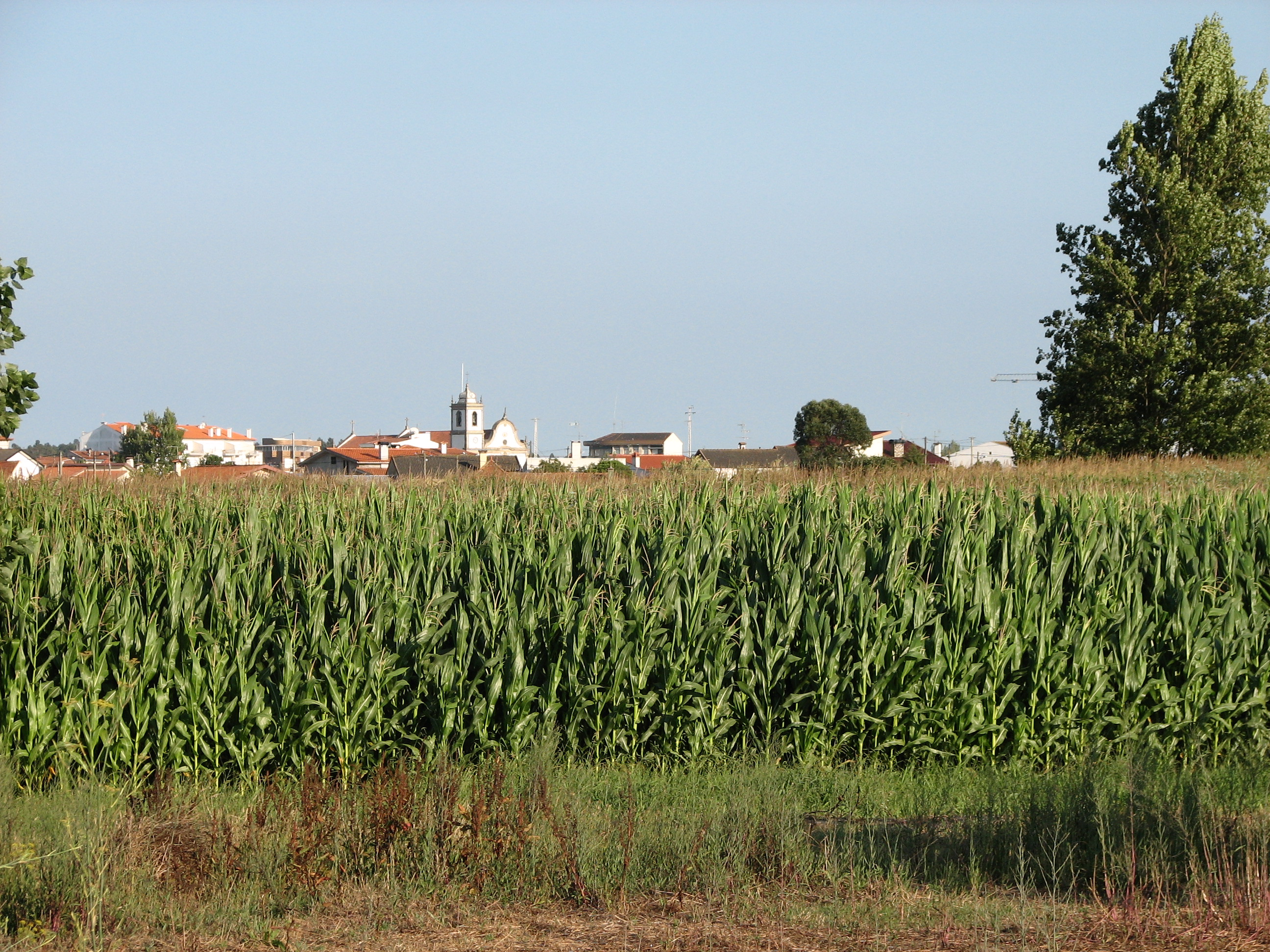
- The town seen from the west

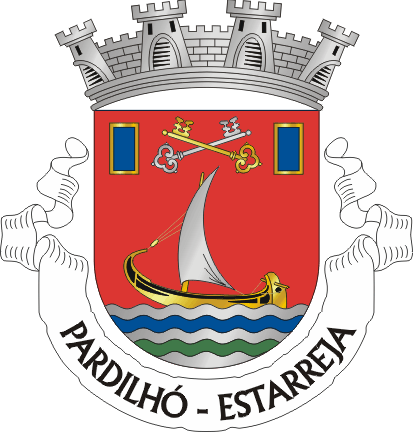
- Coat of arms

- Location in Portugal
- Coordinates: 40°47′51″N 8°37′29″W
- Country: Portugal
- Region: Centro
- Intermunic. comm.: Região de Aveiro
- District: Aveiro
- Municipality: Estarreja

Area
  - Total: 15.7 km^{2} (6.1 sq mi)

Population (2011)
  - Total: 4,176
  - Density: 266/km^{2} (689/sq mi)
- Time zone: UTC+00:00 (WET)
  - Summer (DST): UTC+01:00 (WEST)
- Postal code: 3860 - 464 Pardilhó

Pardilhó is a village and a civil parish of the municipality of Estarreja, Portugal. The population in 2011 was 4,176, in an area of 15.7 km^{2}.
