= Fernando Lemos =

Portuguese visual artist and photographer (1926–2019)

- Born: José Fernandes de Lemos; May 3, 1926; Lisbon, Portugal
- Died: December 17, 2019 (aged 93); São Paulo, Brazil
- Known for: Painting, photography, poetry
- Movement: modernism, surrealism

José Fernandes de Lemos (May 3, 1926 – December 17, 2019), known professionally as Fernando Lemos, was a Portuguese-Brazilian painter, graphic designer and photographer.

He belongs to the third generation of Portuguese modernist artists. He took up residence in Brazil in 1953, acquiring Brazilian nationality a few years later. He developed a multifaceted practice, dedicating himself to the fine arts (painting, drawing, photography) and design (graphic and industrial) as well as writing and teaching.

== Biography and work ==
Born in Lisbon, he studied at the António Arroio School of Decorative Arts and attended the free painting course at the National Society of Fine Arts in Lisbon. He initially defined himself as a surrealist, painting, drawing, writing poetry and taking photographs.

In 1949 he purchased a Flexaret camera and began his work in photography using processes widely used in Surrealist photography (solarization, superimpositions, negative and positive prints) while building a language of image fragmentation later used by artists such as Man Ray.

In 1952 he exhibited, with Marcelino Vespeira and Fernando Azevedo at Casa Jalco in Lisbon. In this exhibition, in addition to 22 gouaches, 28 drawings, and 20 oil paintings characterized by the exploration of abstract register and the dynamic combination of organic and angular forms, it presented a set of portraits in which manipulated photography was used to reveal characteristic aspects of their subjects.

In 1952, with José-Augusto França, he directed the Galeria de Março. He abandoned photography and, the following year, his stance of opposition to the Salazar regime led him to leave Portugal and take up residence in São Paulo, Brazil. In 1953, part of his photography collection was exhibited at the Museum of Modern Art in São Paulo and at the Museum of Modern Art in Rio de Janeiro. Throughout the 1950s he dedicated himself to drawing, exhibiting at for example, at Galeria de Março (1954). He won the Brazilian National Prize at the 1957 São Paulo Biennial.

In 1959 he participated in the Exhibition 50 Independent Artists (SNBA, Lisbon) and, in 1961, in the II Exhibition of Visual Arts of the Calouste Gulbenkian Foundation, where he exhibited four drawings that "break or extend the traditional limits of Western drawing." In 1962 he received a scholarship to Japan, sponsored by the Calouste Gulbenkian Foundation. In 1973, he participated in the Inaugural Collective Exhibition at Galeria Quadrum and, in the same year, exhibited paintings at Galeria Dinastia.

Throughout the 1960s, he opted, in his pictorial production, for principles of plastic composition that led him to the "affirmation of a concrete abstractionism, defined by the presence and overlapping of black forms [...], which was very different from visual references and the surreal atmospheres that guided his first works."

His activity as a poet and writer includes his participation, between 1955 and 1975, in the writing of the newspaper Portugal Democrático – a publication created by Portuguese political exiles in Brazil – his collaboration in the magazine Colóquio/Artes (since 1971) and the publication of the poetry book Cá & Lá (Imprensa Nacional, Lisbon, 1985).

His other professional activities include decorating Brazilian representation pavilions at international fairs (New York, 1957; Tokyo, 1963); teaching activity at the Faculty of Architecture and Urbanism of the University of S. Paulo; the presidency of the Brazilian Association of Industrial Design; the creation, in 1963, of a children's literature publishing house (Giroflé).

In 1994, he exhibited individually at the Centro de Arte Moderna in Lisbon.

Lemos died in São Paulo at the age of 93, succumbing to a kidney infection. He is survived by five children and his wife, Beatrix Overmeer.

== Awards and honours ==
He won the Annual Photography Prize of the Centro Português de Fotografia, Porto, 2001. On 5 April 2004, he was awarded the degree of Commander of the Order of Prince Henry. He was awarded the 2016 Visual Arts Critic Prize from APCA (São Paulo Art Critics Association). On June 6, 2018, he was elevated to the rank of Grand Officer of the Order of Prince Henry.
