= Sever do Vouga =

- Municipality
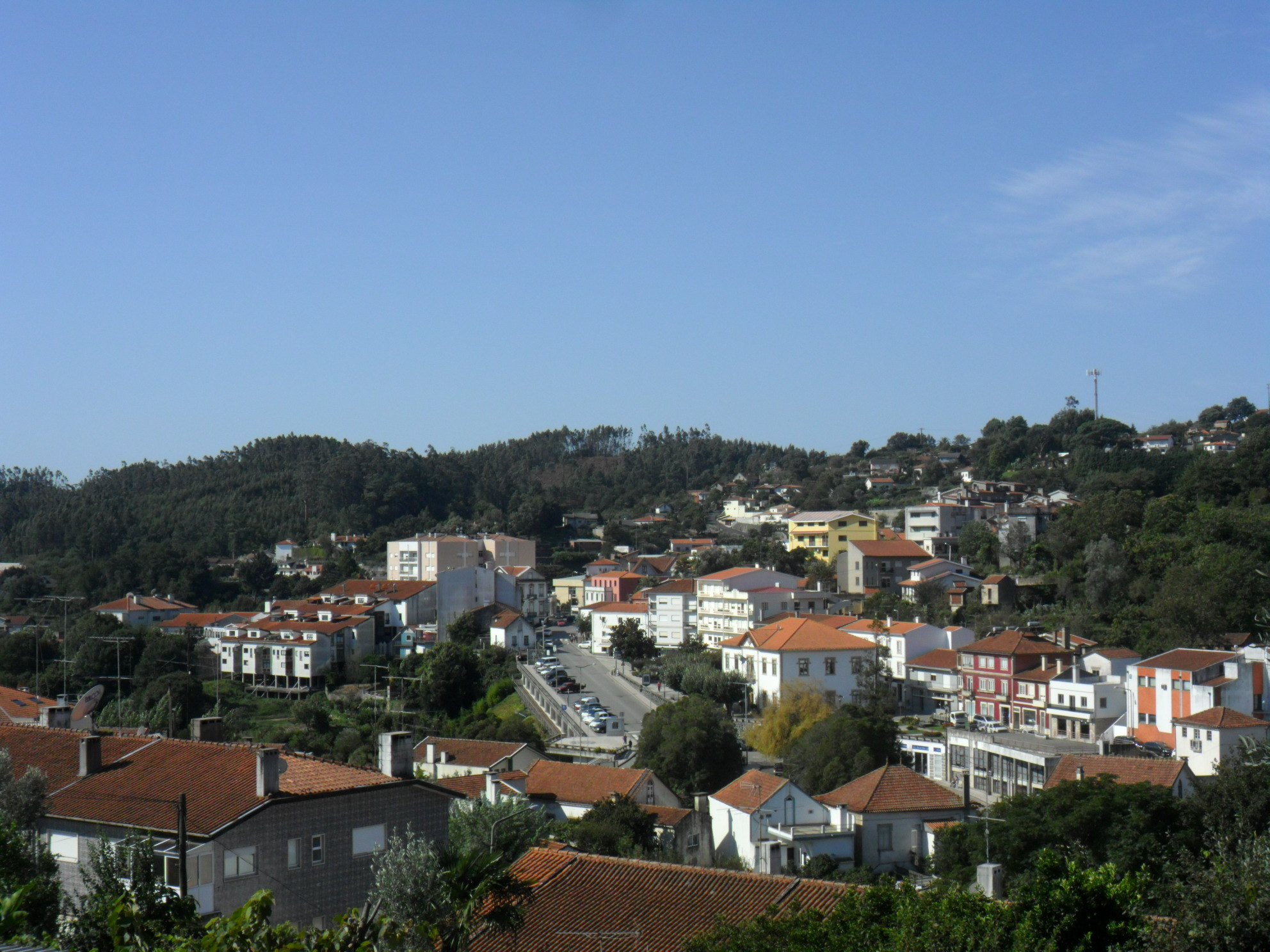

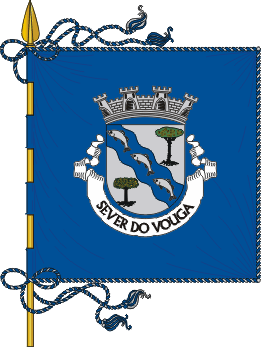
- Flag Coat of arms
- Interactive map of Sever do Vouga
- Coordinates: 40°44′N 8°22′W
- Country: Portugal
- Region: Centro
- Intermunic. comm.: Região de Aveiro
- District: Aveiro
- Parishes: 7

Government
  - President: Pedro Amadeu Lobo (PSD)

Area
  - Total: 129.88 km^{2} (50.15 sq mi)

Population (2011)
  - Total: 12,356
  - Density: 95.134/km^{2} (246.40/sq mi)
- Time zone: UTC+00:00 (WET)
  - Summer (DST): UTC+01:00 (WEST)
- Local holiday: September 21
- Website: http://www.cm-sever.pt

Sever do Vouga (Portuguese pronunciation: [sɨˈvɛɾ ðu ˈvoɣɐ]) is a town and a municipality in the District of Aveiro in Portugal The population in 2011 was 12,356, in an area of 129.88 km^{2}. It had 11,734 eligible voters (2013). The municipality is a center of metalworking industry.

The municipality is included in the Região de Aveiro.

The present Mayor is António José Martins Coutinho, elected by the Socialist Party.

The municipal holiday is the September 21.

== Demographics ==
Population of Sever do Vouga Municipality (1801–2011)
1801	1849	1900	1930	1960	1981	1991	2001	2004	2011
4454	6394	9002	12038	14077	13783	13826	13186	12940	12356

== Parishes ==
Administratively, the municipality is divided into 7 civil parishes (freguesias):

- Cedrim e Paradela
- Couto de Esteves
- Pessegueiro do Vouga
- Rocas do Vouga
- Sever do Vouga
- Silva Escura e Dornelas
- Talhadas

== Famous people ==
- Martin Silva (born 1952 in Sever do Vouga) politician and radio personality in Toronto, Ontario, Canada.
- Luísa Beirão (born 1977 in Sever do Vouga) a Portuguese model.
