= Anadia, Portugal =

Municipality in Portugal's Aveiro District

Anadia
- Municipality
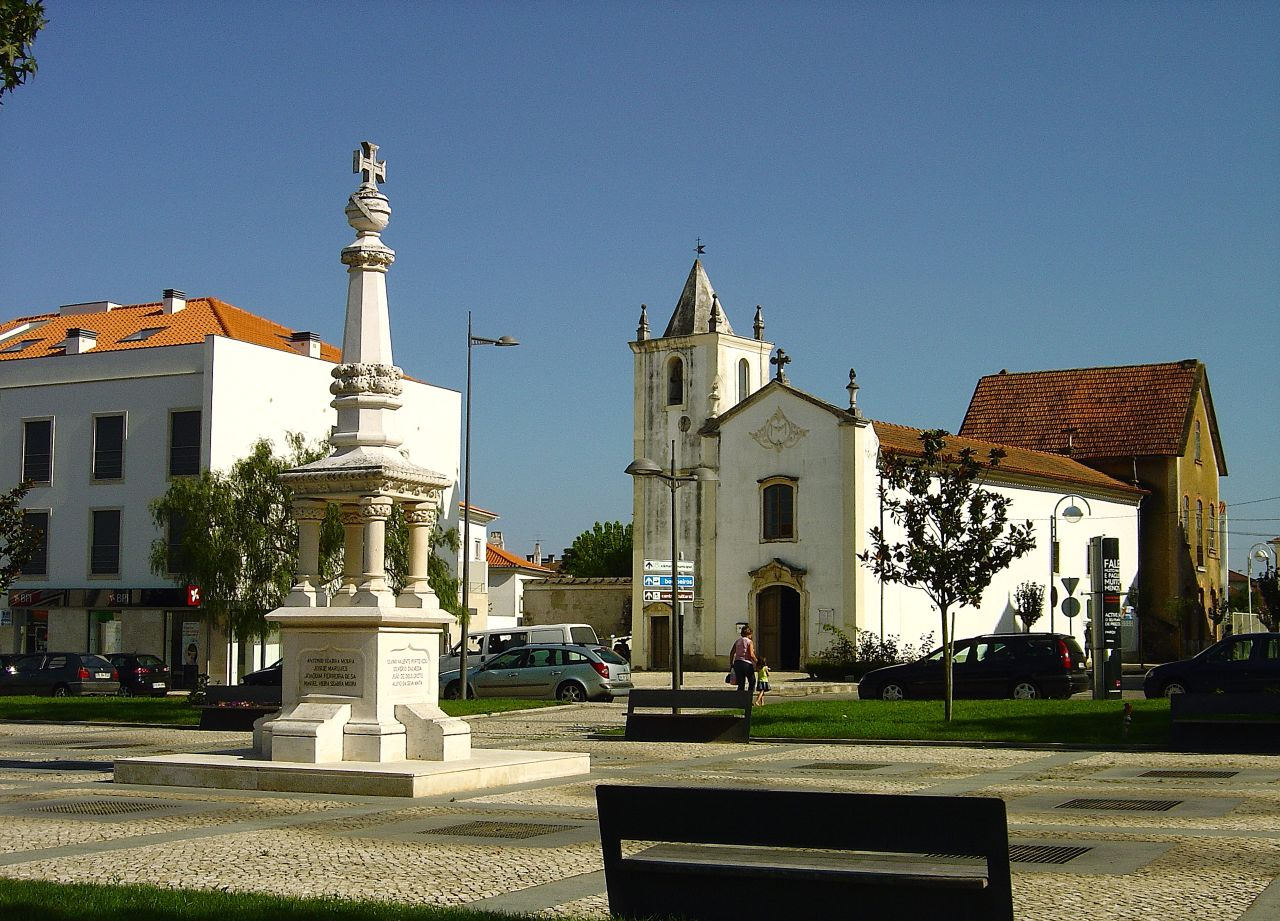
- View of Anadia

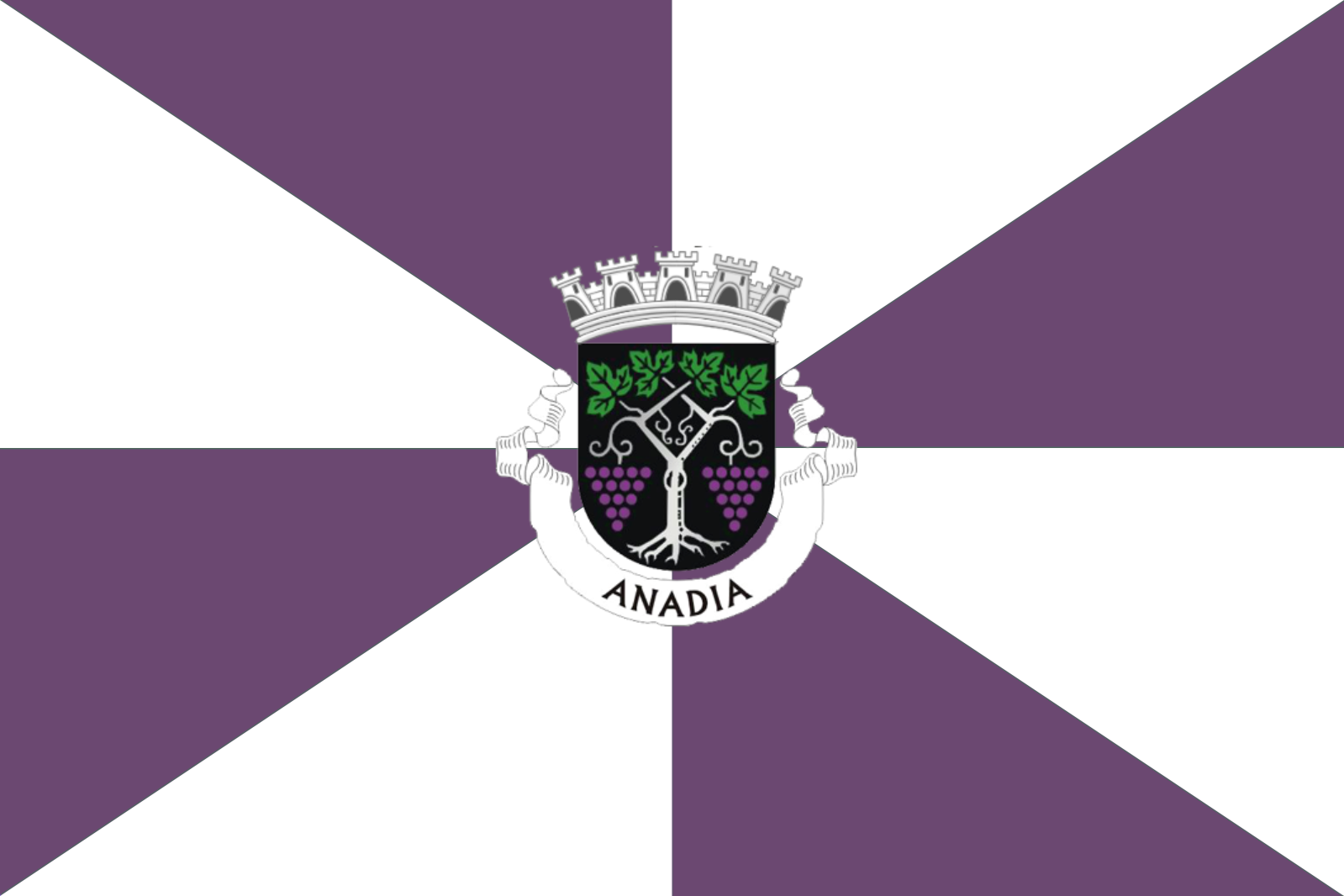
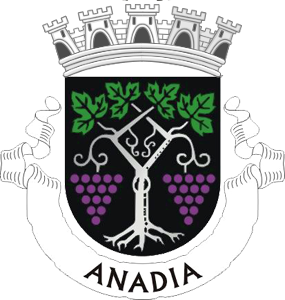
- Flag Coat of arms
- Interactive map of Anadia
- Location in Portugal
- Coordinates: 40°26′27″N 8°26′6″W
- Country: Portugal
- Region: Centro
- Intermunic. comm.: Região de Aveiro
- District: Aveiro
- Parishes: 10

Government
  - President: Ana Matias (PS)

Area
  - Total: 216.63 km^{2} (83.64 sq mi)
- Elevation: 49 m (161 ft)

Population (2011)
  - Total: 29,150
  - Density: 134.6/km^{2} (348.5/sq mi)
- Time zone: UTC+00:00 (WET)
  - Summer (DST): UTC+01:00 (WEST)
- Postal code: 3780
- Area code: 231
- Patron: São Paio
- Website: http://www.cm-anadia.pt/

Anadia (European Portuguese pronunciation: [ɐnɐˈði.ɐ]) is a municipality in Portugal. The population in 2011 was 29,150, in an area of 216.63 km^{2}. It had 26,915 eligible voters. The city of Anadia is part of Arcos e Mogofores parish. The city itself had a population of 3,034 in 2001, while Arcos e Mogofores parish has about 5,000.

== History ==
The history of the municipality is poorly documented before the Roman era, although some vestiges of early Paleolithic (Monte Crasto, Carvalhais and Vila Nova de Monsarros), Neolithic (Moita) and Iron Age (Monte Crasto) artifacts have been studied in this area. But remnants of Roman-era artifacts have been isolated in many parts of the municipality, including Aguim, Avelãs de Caminho, Avelãs de Cima, Mogofores, Moita, Óis do Bairro, São Lourenço do Bairro, Vila Nova de Monsarros, Vilarinho do Bairro and, especially, in Anadia (Monte Crasto) and Sangalhos. In addition to domestic ceramic evidence, the early villages in this area existed along the crossroads between the major Roman towns of the time: Olissipo (Lisbon) and Cale (Porto). This continues to be a source of investigation and theories as to the local importance.

Although there may have existed organized communities during this period, it was only during the Medieval Age when documentation began to appear. As such, the villages of São Lourenço do Bairro (883), Arcos (943), Sangalhos (957), Vila Nova de Monsarros (1006), Levira (1020), Vilarinho do Bairro (1020), Samel (1020), Monsarros (1064), Moita (1064), Tamengos (1064), Horta (1064), Anadia (1082), Quintela (1082), Óis do Bairro (1086), Aguim (1101), Mata (1131), Avelãs de Baixo (1132), Figueira (1138), Ferreiros (1138), Ancas (1143), Mogofores (1143), Sá (1143) and Paredes do Bairro (1143), where documented in local land registries and referenced in court records.

With about five centuries of populational existence, the area of Anadia developed over successive mutations in administrative domain. The region, during its formative age, was not developed from the implementation of forals as was the traditional method of instituting land development. But, in the historical Aveiro district, three forals were instituted to promote development: Ferreiros, Fontemanha and Vale de Avim (centers that were part of the older parish of Moita). There have been posterior references to forals conceded in this area (in Avelãs de Caminho, for example), but they were insufficiently explained to indicate that the forals were more than merely local or defensive contracts between the Crown and/or the peoples of the area. Further, there were erroneous references to older forals by contemporary authors, particularly regarding the municipalities of Aguim and Anadia. At the beginning of the 16th century, during the administrative reforms of King Manuel I, the king did not forget the coastal central region and allocated several forals. In 1514, the municipalities of Anadia, Avelãs de Cima, Vilarinho do Bairro, Carvalhais (which included Ferreiros, Fontemanha and Vale de Avim), São Lourenço do Bairro, Aguim, Sangalhos, Pereiro (the parish of Avelãs de Cima), Óis do Bairro, Mogofores, Avelãs de Caminho, Boialvo (parish of Avelãs de Cima) and Vila Nova de Monsarros; in 1519 Paredes do Bairro was granted a writ and then in 1520 forals for Mogofores and Óis do Bairro were established.

== Geography and Climate ==
The municipality of Anadia is located in the Beira Litoral area of the Centro Region, in an area of the Baixo Vouga referred to as the Bairrada, an area traditionally representative of the district of Aveiro. Anadia is situated geographically between the municipalities of Águeda and Oliveira do Bairro (in the north), Mealhada (to the south) and bordered by the municipal borders of Cantanhede (in the west) and Mortágua (in the east).

=== Climate ===
Climate data for Anadia (1991–2020)
Month	Jan	Feb	Mar	Apr	May	Jun	Jul	Aug	Sep	Oct	Nov	Dec	Year
Record high °C (°F)	22.7 (72.9)	25.1 (77.2)	30.3 (86.5)	32.7 (90.9)	36.6 (97.9)	40.1 (104.2)	42.2 (108.0)	43.8 (110.8)	41.6 (106.9)	35.8 (96.4)	26.7 (80.1)	21.4 (70.5)	43.8 (110.8)
Mean daily maximum °C (°F)	14.2 (57.6)	16.1 (61.0)	18.9 (66.0)	20.4 (68.7)	23.2 (73.8)	26.2 (79.2)	28.6 (83.5)	29.3 (84.7)	27.3 (81.1)	22.7 (72.9)	17.3 (63.1)	14.8 (58.6)	21.6 (70.9)
Daily mean °C (°F)	9.5 (49.1)	10.5 (50.9)	13.0 (55.4)	14.6 (58.3)	17.2 (63.0)	20.0 (68.0)	21.8 (71.2)	22.2 (72.0)	20.5 (68.9)	17.1 (62.8)	12.6 (54.7)	10.4 (50.7)	15.8 (60.4)
Mean daily minimum °C (°F)	4.8 (40.6)	5.0 (41.0)	7.2 (45.0)	8.7 (47.7)	11.1 (52.0)	13.7 (56.7)	15.0 (59.0)	15.2 (59.4)	13.7 (56.7)	11.6 (52.9)	7.9 (46.2)	6.0 (42.8)	10.0 (50.0)
Record low °C (°F)	−4.7 (23.5)	−3.6 (25.5)	−4.5 (23.9)	0.4 (32.7)	2.5 (36.5)	6.4 (43.5)	7.5 (45.5)	8.0 (46.4)	5.0 (41.0)	−0.3 (31.5)	−2.5 (27.5)	−3.6 (25.5)	−4.7 (23.5)
Average precipitation mm (inches)	135.4 (5.33)	94.3 (3.71)	89.3 (3.52)	102.3 (4.03)	73.1 (2.88)	29.7 (1.17)	13.4 (0.53)	17.9 (0.70)	55.2 (2.17)	126.6 (4.98)	131.3 (5.17)	128.9 (5.07)	997.5 (39.27)
Average precipitation days (≥ 1 mm)	12.1	9.1	9.2	11.1	8.9	3.9	2.5	2.3	5.5	10.5	11.8	11.5	98.5
Source: Instituto Português do Mar e da Atmosfera

Climate data for Anadia, 1971-2000 normals and extremes
Month	Jan	Feb	Mar	Apr	May	Jun	Jul	Aug	Sep	Oct	Nov	Dec	Year
Record high °C (°F)	21.6 (70.9)	24.5 (76.1)	28.5 (83.3)	31.5 (88.7)	35.0 (95.0)	41.0 (105.8)	40.5 (104.9)	40.6 (105.1)	40.6 (105.1)	32.5 (90.5)	27.5 (81.5)	25.0 (77.0)	41.0 (105.8)
Mean daily maximum °C (°F)	14.2 (57.6)	15.5 (59.9)	17.7 (63.9)	18.8 (65.8)	21.1 (70.0)	25.0 (77.0)	27.7 (81.9)	27.9 (82.2)	26.3 (79.3)	22.0 (71.6)	17.7 (63.9)	15.0 (59.0)	20.7 (69.3)
Daily mean °C (°F)	9.3 (48.7)	10.5 (50.9)	12.1 (53.8)	13.3 (55.9)	15.8 (60.4)	19.1 (66.4)	21.3 (70.3)	21.2 (70.2)	19.7 (67.5)	16.3 (61.3)	12.5 (54.5)	10.6 (51.1)	15.1 (59.3)
Mean daily minimum °C (°F)	4.3 (39.7)	5.4 (41.7)	6.4 (43.5)	7.8 (46.0)	10.4 (50.7)	13.3 (55.9)	14.9 (58.8)	14.5 (58.1)	13.3 (55.9)	10.7 (51.3)	7.5 (45.5)	6.2 (43.2)	9.6 (49.2)
Record low °C (°F)	−5.5 (22.1)	−5 (23)	−4.5 (23.9)	−2.0 (28.4)	0.5 (32.9)	4.5 (40.1)	7.2 (45.0)	6.0 (42.8)	2.0 (35.6)	−2.0 (28.4)	−3.5 (25.7)	−3.6 (25.5)	−5.5 (22.1)
Average rainfall mm (inches)	131.1 (5.16)	125.5 (4.94)	79.3 (3.12)	101.2 (3.98)	81.4 (3.20)	40.4 (1.59)	12.9 (0.51)	16.3 (0.64)	51.1 (2.01)	109.6 (4.31)	111.8 (4.40)	151.2 (5.95)	1,011.8 (39.81)
Average precipitation days (≥ 0.1 mm)	14.2	14.1	11.5	13.0	11.5	7.0	3.3	3.3	7.7	12.2	12.1	13.4	123.3
Source: Instituto de Meteorologia

=== Human geography ===
Anadia is in the heart of Bairrada, a fertile agricultural and viticulture area, which has recently stagnated in terms of population. Anadia municipality has one city: Anadia (which is in the parish of Arcos) and one town: Sangalhos. Curia, a village in Tamengos parish is a popular tourist spa with hotels, restaurants and a park with a lagoon.

Population of Anandia (1849 - 2011)
Year	Pop.	±%
1849	5,761	—
1900	17,161	+197.9%
1930	23,245	+35.5%
1960	29,039	+24.9%
1981	29,820	+2.7%
1991	28,899	−3.1%
2001	31,545	+9.2%
2004	31,671	+0.4%
2006	31,660	−0.0%
2011	29,150	−7.9%

Administratively, the municipality is divided into 10 civil parishes (freguesias):

- Amoreira da Gândara, Paredes do Bairro e Ancas
- Arcos e Mogofores
- Avelãs de Caminho
- Avelãs de Cima
- Moita
- Sangalhos
- São Lourenço do Bairro
- Tamengos, Aguim e Óis do Bairro
- Vila Nova de Monsarros
- Vilarinho do Bairro

== Notable people ==
- António Xavier Machado e Cerveira (1756–1828) a Portuguese Baroque organ builder
- Maria da Conceição Tavares (born 1930) a Portuguese naturalized Brazilian economist
- Beatriz Amélia Alves de Sousa Oliveira Basto da Silva (born 1944) history researcher from Macau
- Paulo Adriano (born 1977) a Portuguese former footballer with 357 club caps
- Nelson Oliveira (born 1989) a Portuguese road racing cyclist
