= Estarreja =

- Municipality
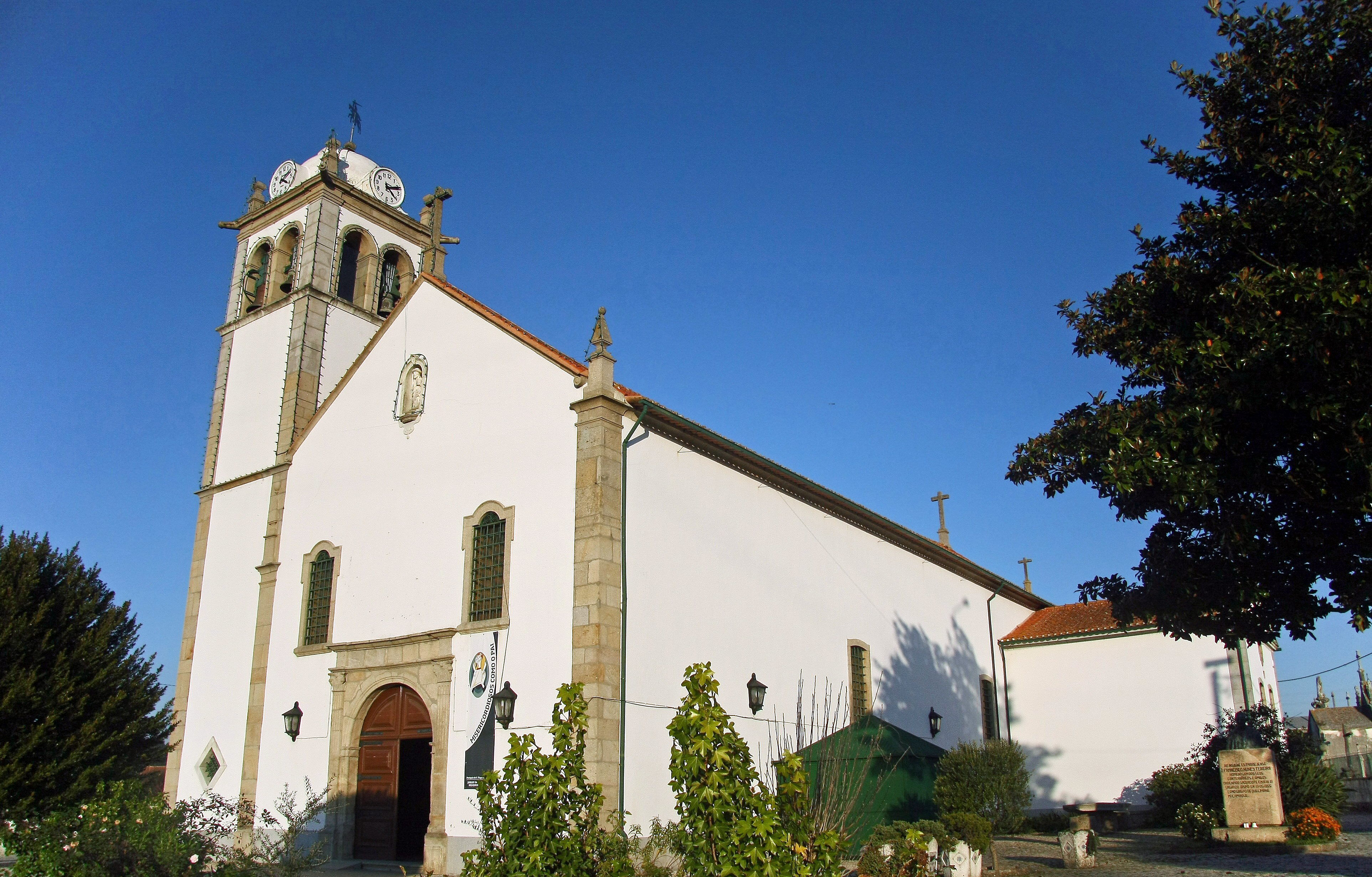
- Parish Church of Estarreja

- Flag Coat of arms
- Interactive map of Estarreja
- Location in Portugal
- Coordinates: 40°45′N 8°34′W
- Country: Portugal
- Region: Centro
- Intermunic. comm.: Região de Aveiro
- District: Aveiro
- Parishes: 5

Government
  - President: Diamantino Sabina (PSD-CDS–PP)

Area
  - Total: 108.17 km^{2} (41.76 sq mi)

Population (2021)
  - Total: 26,213
  - Density: 242.33/km^{2} (627.64/sq mi)
- Time zone: UTC+00:00 (WET)
  - Summer (DST): UTC+01:00 (WEST)
- Local holiday: Saint Anthony; 13 June
- Website: www.cm-estarreja.pt

Estarreja (pronounced [(i)ʃtɐˈʁɐjʒɐ], [(i)ʃtɐˈʁe(j)ʒɐ] or [(i)ʃtɐˈʁɛʒɐ]) is a municipality in Portugal. The population in 2021 was 26,213, in an area of 108.17 km^{2}. The only city in the municipality is Estarreja, which is in the urban parish of Beduido. The city itself has a population of approximately 7,000. It is built along the banks of the Antuã River, near the Ria de Aveiro. Estarreja is an important chemical industry centre, being the place where several industrial facilities of CUF are located.

The municipality is part of the Aveiro District, in the Baixo Vouga subregion, in the Centro Region, Portugal.

Main train stations are Estarreja and Avanca.

The present Mayor is Diamantino Sabina, elected by a coalition between the Social Democratic Party and the People's Party. The municipal holiday is 13 June, the feast of Saint Anthony of Padua.

== Demographics ==
Population of Estarreja Municipality (1801 – 2011)
1801	1849	1900	1930	1960	1981	1991	2001	2004	2006	2011	2021
17075	26147	34041	23397	25213	26261	26742	28182	28279	28332	26997	26213

In 1926 a portion of territory with about 13,000 inhabitants was taken away from Estarreja municipality to become the municipality of Murtosa. Hence the population drop from 1900 to 1930.

== Parishes ==
Administratively, the municipality is divided into 5 civil parishes (freguesias):

- Avanca
- Beduído e Veiros
- Canelas e Fermelã
- Pardilhó (town)
- Salreu (town)

== Cities and towns ==
- Estarreja (city)
- Avanca (town)
- Pardilhó (town)
- Salreu (town)

== Notable people ==
António Egas Moniz (1874–1955), the famous Portuguese doctor was born in Avanca, Estarreja. He was the first Portuguese national to receive a Nobel Prize in 1949.
