= Vagos =

- Municipality
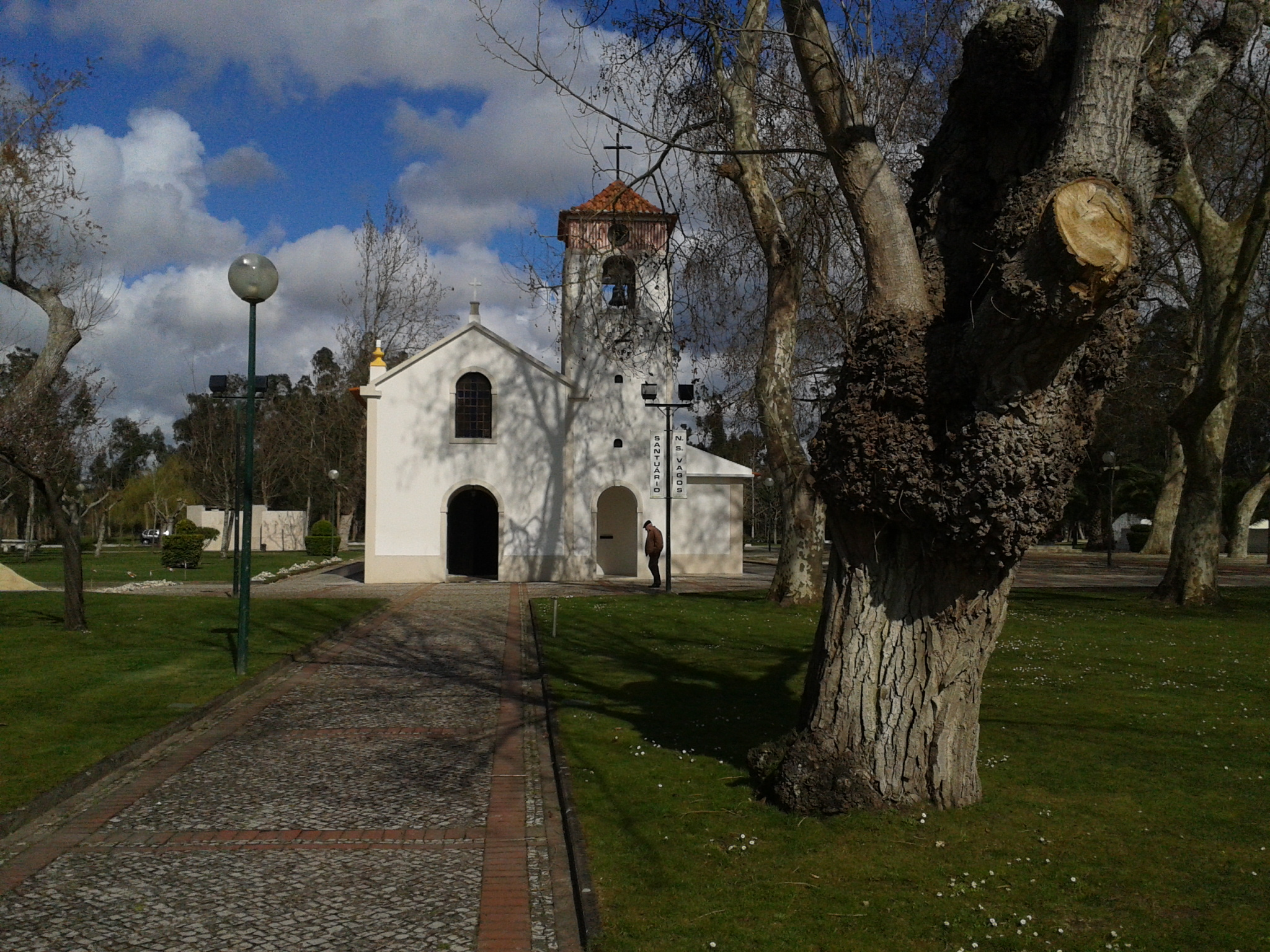
- Chapel of Nossa Senhora de Vagos

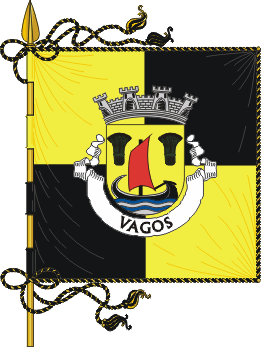
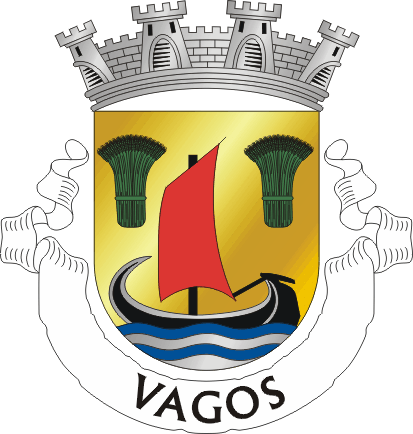
- Flag Coat of arms
- Interactive map of Vagos
- Coordinates: 40°33′N 8°40′W
- Country: Portugal
- Region: Centro
- Intermunic. comm.: Região de Aveiro
- District: Aveiro
- Parishes: 8

Government
  - President: Silvério Regalado (PSD)

Area
  - Total: 164.92 km^{2} (63.68 sq mi)

Population (2011)
  - Total: 22,851
  - Density: 138.56/km^{2} (358.86/sq mi)
- Time zone: UTC+00:00 (WET)
  - Summer (DST): UTC+01:00 (WEST)
- Local holiday: Monday after the Whit Sunday
- Website: http://www.cm-vagos.pt

Vagos (Portuguese pronunciation: [ˈvaɣuʃ]) is a town and a municipality in Aveiro District, belonging to Centro Region of Portugal. The district capital, Aveiro, is its nearest large city. Its population in 2011 was 22,851 in an area of 164.92 km^{2}, and it had 17,204 eligible voters. It is part of the intermunicipal community of Região de Aveiro.

In Roman times, the municipality was called Vacus, and had both coastline and large sand dune valleys just east of its center. Increases in sedimentation and sand drifts leveled and lengthened these distances. According to António Gomes da Rocha Madail and other writers, there is tradition among the native population that they are descendants of the seafaring salt farmers of Phoenicia.

Due to its fertile soils, agriculture plays a major role in the municipality's economy. Its green meadows create exceptional conditions for cattle breeding and milk production at a national level. The forest areas and vegetable production are other sources of prosperity for the municipality. Ceramics are the principal money-maker in its industrial sector.

Its present mayor is João Paulo de Sousa Gonçalves of the Social Democratic Party.

The municipal holiday is the Monday after Whit Sunday. Its mother church honors Saint James.

== Demographics ==
Population of Vagos Municipality (1801–2011)
1801	1849	1900	1930	1960	1981	1991	2001	2004	2011
4047	6961	11954	15860	20250	18548	19068	22017	23205	22851

== Cities and towns ==
- Sosa (town)

== Parishes ==
Administratively, the municipality is divided into 8 civil parishes (freguesias):

- Calvão
- Fonte de Angeão e Covão do Lobo
- Gafanha da Boa Hora
- Ouca
- Ponte de Vagos e Santa Catarina
- Santo André de Vagos
- Sosa
- Vagos e Santo António

== Famous people ==
- Manuel Freire (born 1942), Portuguese singer and composer.

== See also ==
- Associação Desportiva de Vagos, women's basketball club founded in 1994.
- Vagos Open Air, metal festival held in Vagos from 2009 to 2015.
