= Região de Aveiro =

- Intermunicipal community
- Logo

- Coordinates: 40.63°N 8.63°W
- Country: Portugal
- Region: Centro
- Established: 2008
- Seat: Aveiro
- Municipalities: 11

Area
  - Total: 1,692.86 km^{2} (653.62 sq mi)

Population (2011)
  - Total: 370,394
  - Density: 218.798/km^{2} (566.684/sq mi)
- Time zone: UTC+00:00 (WET)
  - Summer (DST): UTC+01:00 (WEST)
- Website: www.regiaodeaveiro.pt

The Comunidade Intermunicipal da Região de Aveiro (Intermunicipal Aveiro Region) is an administrative division in Portugal. It was created in October 2008, replacing the previously existing Greater Metropolitan Area of Aveiro. Since January 2015, Região de Aveiro is also a NUTS3 subregion of Centro Region, that covers the same area as the intermunicipal community. The main city and seat of the intermunicipal community is Aveiro. The population in 2011 was 370,394, in an area of 1,692.86 square kilometres (653.62 mi^{2}).

== Municipalities ==
The intermunicipal community of Região de Aveiro is subdivided into 11 municipalities:

Municipality	Population (2011)	Area (km^{2})
Águeda	47,729	335.27
Albergaria-a-Velha	25,252	158.83
Anadia	29,150	216.63
Aveiro	78,450	197.58
Estarreja	26,997	108.17
Ílhavo	38,598	73.48
Murtosa	10,585	73.09
Oliveira do Bairro	23,028	87.32
Ovar	55,398	147.70
Sever do Vouga	12,356	129.88
Vagos	22,851	164.92
Total	370,394	1,692.86
