= Aveiro District =

District of Portugal

Coordinates: 40°38′28″N 8°39′14″W

District of Aveiro Distrito de Aveiro (Portuguese)
- District
- Flag Coat of arms

- Country: Portugal
- Region: Centro and Norte
- Historical province: Beira Litoral and Douro Litoral
- No. of municipalities: 19
- No. of parishes: 174
- Capital: Aveiro

Area
  - Total: 2,808 km^{2} (1,084 sq mi)

Population
  - Total: 713,578
  - Density: 250/km^{2} (650/sq mi)
- ISO 3166 code: PT-01
- No. of parliamentary representatives: 16

Aveiro District (Portuguese: Distrito de Aveiro, pronounced [aˈvɐjɾu]) is located in the central coastal region of Portugal. The capital of the district is the city of Aveiro, which also serves as the seat of Aveiro Municipality.

Aveiro District is bordered by the Porto District to the north, the Viseu District to the east, the Coimbra District to the south, and the Atlantic Ocean to the west.

The 19 municipalities of Aveiro District are split between the Norte (Metropolitan Area of Porto) and the Centro (Região de Aveiro) subregions.

== Municipalities ==
The district is composed of 19 municipalities:

CoA	Name	Area (km^{2})	Pop.	Pop/Area (1/km^{2})	No P.	No C./No T.	Subregion
	Águeda	335.3	47,729	148	20	1/?	Baixo Vouga
	Albergaria-a-Velha	155.4	25,497	164	8	0/?	Baixo Vouga
	Anadia	216.6	31,671	146	15	1/?	Baixo Vouga
	Arouca	329.1	24,019	73	20	0/?	Metropolitan Area of Porto
	Aveiro	199.9	73,626	368	14	1/?	Baixo Vouga
	Castelo de Paiva	115.0	17,089	149	9	0/2	Tâmega
	Espinho	21.1	31,703	1,503	5	1/1	Metropolitan Area of Porto
	Estarreja	108.4	28,279	261	7	1/3	Baixo Vouga
	Ílhavo	73.5	39,247	534	4	2/?	Baixo Vouga
	Mealhada	110.7	20,496	194	8	1/?	Baixo Vouga
	Murtosa	73.3	9,657	132	4	0/1	Baixo Vouga
	Oliveira de Azeméis	163.5	71,243	436	19	1/9	Metropolitan Area of Porto
	Oliveira do Bairro	87.3	22,365	256	6	1/?	Baixo Vouga
	Ovar	147.4	56,715	385	8	2/3	Baixo Vouga
	Santa Maria da Feira	215.1	142,295	662	31	3/13	Metropolitan Area of Porto
	São João da Madeira	7.9	21,538	2,726	1	1/0	Metropolitan Area of Porto
	Sever do Vouga	129.6	12,940	100	9	0/?	Baixo Vouga
	Vagos	169.9	23,205	137	11	0/2	Baixo Vouga
	Vale de Cambra	146.5	22,864	169	9	1/?	Metropolitan Area of Porto

The 19 municipalities in all are divided into 174 freguesias or parishes.

== Summary of votes and seats won 1976-2022 ==
Summary of election results from Aveiro district, 1976-2022
Parties	%	S	%	S	%	S	%	S	%	S	%	S	%	S	%	S	%	S	%	S	%	S	%	S	%	S	%	S	%	S	%	S
Parties	1976		1979		1980		1983		1985		1987		1991		1995		1999		2002		2005		2009		2011		2015		2019		2022	
PS	30.8	5	28.4	5	27.1	4	36.6	6	23.0	4	22.9	4	27.8	4	40.2	6	40.2	7	33.5	5	41.1	8	33.8	6	25.9	5	27.9	5	34.3	7	39.5	8
PSD	35.2	6	In AD				34.8	6	38.4	6	60.2	11	58.6	9	41.2	6	38.3	6	46.4	8	35.7	6	34.6	7	44.5	8	In PàF		33.6	6	35.7	7
CDS-PP	22.5	4	In AD				16.4	2	13.5	2	5.3		6.1	1	12.6	2	13.6	2	12.9	2	9.8	1	13.0	2	12.9	2	In PàF		5.7	1	2.5	
PCP/APU/CDU	3.7		7.9	1	6.8	1	7.0	1	6.5	1	4.2		2.8		2.7		3.5		2.6		3.5		3.8		4.1		4.4		3.1		1.8	
AD			56.7	9	58.8	10																										
PRD									13.3	2	2.7		0.3																			
BE																	1.3		1.8		5.1		9.0	1	5.0	1	9.6	1	10.0	2	4.6	
PàF																											48.1	10				
CHEGA																													0.7		5.6	1
Total seats	15												14				15						16									
Source: Comissão Nacional de Eleições
