= Siege of Carthage (Third Punic War) =

Carthage-Rome engagement, 149–146 BCE

Coordinates: 36.8531°N 10.3231°E

- Part of the Third Punic War
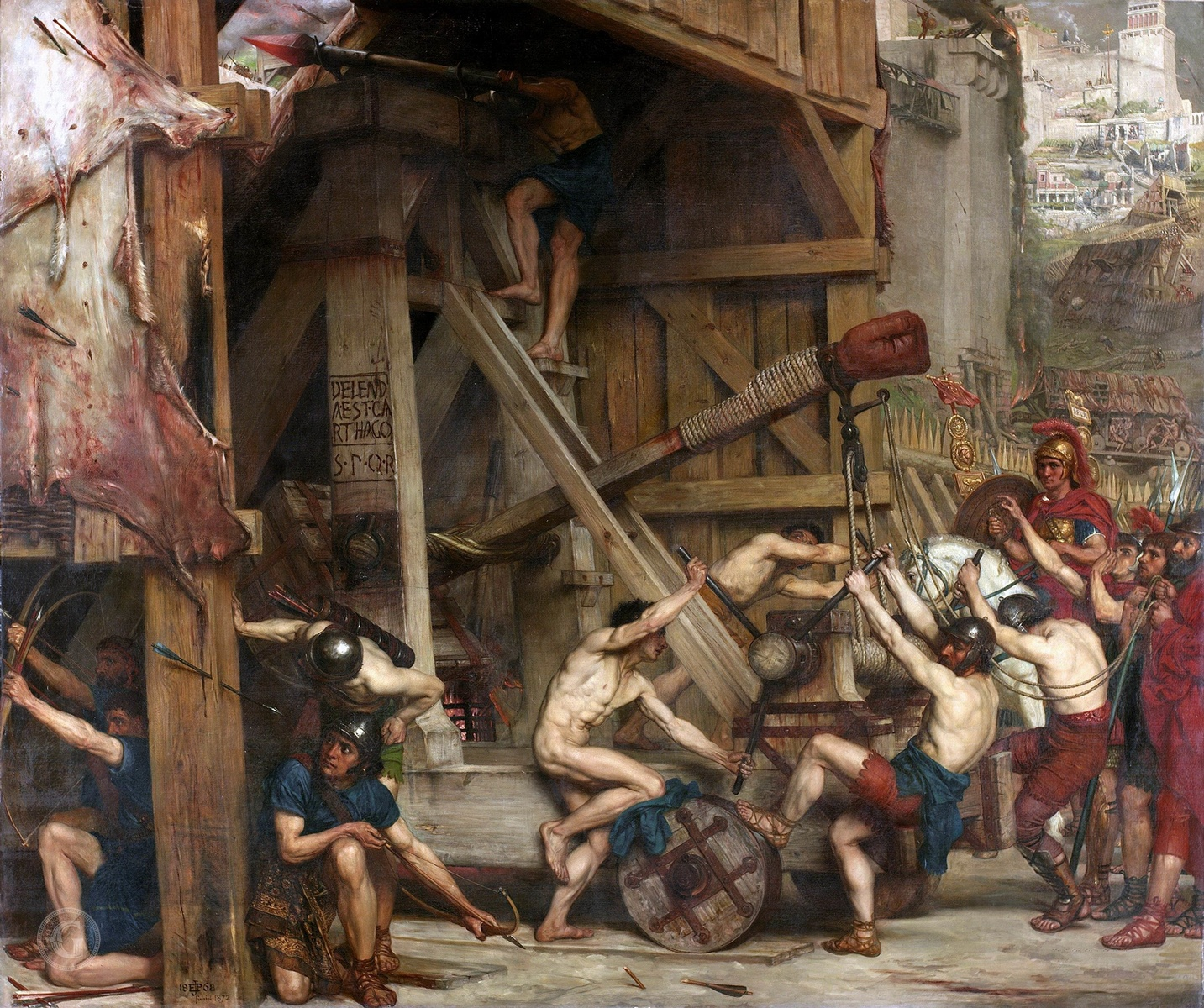
- Catapulta by Edward Poynter. Roman siege engine in action during the siege of Carthage in the Third Punic War.
Date	c. 149 – early 146 BC
Location	Carthage (near Tunis)
Result	Roman victory

Belligerents
Roman Republic	Carthage

Commanders and leaders
Scipio Aemilianus; Manius Manilius; L. Marcius Censorinus; Lucius Calpurnius Piso	Hasdrubal (surrendered)

Strength
36,000–46,000 infantry 4,000 cavalry	30,000 soldiers Large number of armed civilians (around 60,000)

Casualties and losses
Unknown	50,000 enslaved

The siege of Carthage was the main engagement of the Third Punic War fought between Carthage and Rome. It consisted of the nearly three-year siege of the Carthaginian capital, Carthage (a little northeast of Tunis). In 149 BC, a large Roman army landed at Utica in North Africa. The Carthaginians hoped to appease the Romans, but despite the Carthaginians surrendering all of their weapons, the Romans pressed on to besiege the city. The Roman campaign suffered repeated setbacks through 149 BC, only alleviated by Scipio Aemilianus, a middle-ranking officer, distinguishing himself several times. A new Roman commander took over in 148 BC, and fared equally badly. At the annual election of Roman magistrates in early 147 BC, the public support for Scipio was so great that the usual age restrictions were lifted to allow him to be appointed commander in Africa.

Scipio's term began with two Carthaginian successes, but he tightened the siege and commenced a construction of a large mole to prevent supplies from getting into Carthage via blockade runners. The Carthaginians had partially rebuilt their fleet and it sortied, to the Romans' surprise; after an indecisive engagement the Carthaginians mismanaged their withdrawal and lost many ships. The Romans then built a large brick structure in the harbour area, which dominated the city wall. In early 146 BC the Romans launched their final assault, and over one week systematically destroyed the city and killed its inhabitants; only on the last day did they take prisoners – 50,000, who were sold into slavery. The formerly Carthaginian territories became the Roman province of Africa, with Utica as its capital. It was a century before the site of Carthage was rebuilt as a Roman city.

== Primary sources ==
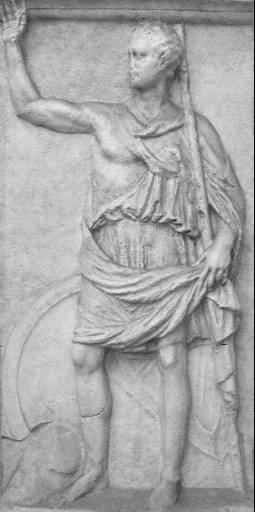
Polybius

The main source for almost every aspect of the Third Punic War (Note: The term Punic comes from the Latin word Punicus (or Poenicus), meaning "Carthaginian", and is a reference to the Carthaginians' Phoenician ancestry.) is the historian Polybius (c. 200 – c. 118 BC), a Greek sent to Rome in 167 BC as a hostage. His works include a now-lost manual on military tactics, but he is now known for The Histories, written sometime after 146 BC. Polybius's work is considered broadly objective and largely neutral as between Carthaginian and Roman points of view. Polybius was an analytical historian and wherever possible personally interviewed participants, from both sides, in the events he wrote about. He accompanied the Roman general Scipio Aemilianus during his campaign in North Africa which resulted in the storming of Carthage and Roman victory in the war.

The accuracy of Polybius's account has been much debated over the past 150 years, but the modern consensus is to accept it largely at face value, and the details of the war in modern sources are largely based on interpretations of Polybius's account. The modern historian Andrew Curry sees Polybius as being "fairly reliable"; while Craige Champion describes him as "a remarkably well-informed, industrious, and insightful historian".

Other, later, ancient histories of the war exist, although often in fragmentary or summary form. Appian's account of the Third Punic War is especially valuable. Modern historians usually also take into account the writings of various Roman annalists, some contemporary; the Sicilian Greek Diodorus Siculus; the later Roman historians Livy (who relied heavily on Polybius), Plutarch and Dio Cassius. The classicist Adrian Goldsworthy states "Polybius' account is usually to be preferred when it differs with any of our other accounts". (Note: Sources other than Polybius are discussed by Bernard Mineo in "Principal Literary Sources for the Punic Wars (apart from Polybius)".) Other sources include coins, inscriptions, archaeological evidence and empirical evidence from reconstructions such as the trireme Olympias.

== Background ==
Map of approximate extent of Numidian, Carthaginian and Roman territory in 150 BC

Carthage and Rome fought the 17-year Second Punic War between 218 and 201 BC, which ended with a Roman victory. The peace treaty imposed on the Carthaginians stripped them of all of their overseas territories, and some of their African ones. An indemnity of 10,000 silver talents (Note: 10,000 talents was approximately 269,000 kg (265 long tons) of silver.) (Note: Several different "talents" are known from antiquity. The ones referred to in this article are all Euboic (or Euboeic) talents, of approximately 26 kilograms (57 lb).) was to be paid over 50 years. Hostages were taken. Carthage was forbidden to possess war elephants and its fleet was restricted to 10 warships. It was prohibited from waging war outside Africa, and in Africa only with Rome's permission. Many senior Carthaginians wanted to reject it, but Hannibal spoke strongly in its favour and it was accepted in early 201 BC. Henceforth, it was clear that Carthage was politically subordinate to Rome.

At the end of the war, the Roman ally Masinissa emerged as by far the most powerful ruler among the Numidians, the dominant indigenous people in North Africa west of Egypt. Over the following 50 years, he repeatedly took advantage of Carthage's inability to protect its possessions. Whenever Carthage petitioned Rome for redress, or permission to take military action, Rome backed its ally, Masinissa, and refused. Masinissa's seizures of and raids into Carthaginian territory became increasingly flagrant. In 151 BC, Carthage raised a large army commanded by Hasdrubal and, the treaty notwithstanding, counterattacked the Numidians. The campaign ended in disaster and the army surrendered; a large number of Carthaginians were subsequently massacred by the Numidians. Hasdrubal escaped to Carthage, where in an attempt to placate Rome he was condemned to death. Carthage had paid off its indemnity and was prospering economically, but was no military threat to Rome. Nevertheless, elements in the Roman Senate had long wished to destroy Carthage, and, using the illicit Carthaginian military action as a pretext, began preparing a punitive expedition. Carthaginian embassies attempted to negotiate with Rome, but when the large North African port city of Utica went over to Rome in 149 BC the Senate and the centuriate assembly declared war.

It was the long-standing Roman procedure to elect two men each year, known as consuls, to each lead an army. A large Roman army landed at Utica in 149 BC under both consuls for the year, Manius Manilius commanding the army and Lucius Censorius the fleet. The Carthaginians continued to attempt to appease Rome, and sent an embassy to Utica. The consuls demanded that they hand over all weaponry, and reluctantly the Carthaginians did so. Great convoys took enormous stocks of equipment from Carthage to Utica. Surviving records state that these included 200,000 sets of armour and 2,000 catapults. Their warships all sailed to Utica and were burnt in the harbour. Once Carthage was disarmed, the consuls made the further demand that the Carthaginians abandon their city and relocate 16 kilometres (10 mi) away from the sea; Carthage would then be destroyed. The Carthaginians abandoned negotiations and prepared to defend their city.

== Opposing forces ==
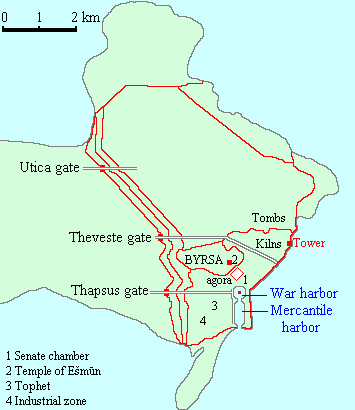
The defences of Carthage

The city of Carthage itself was an unusually large city for the time, with a population estimated between 150 to 250 thousand by several historians, although Miles claims 700,000. It was strongly fortified with walls of more than 35 kilometres (20 mi) circumference. Defending the main approach from the land were three lines of defences, of which the strongest was a brick-built wall 9 metres (30 ft) wide and 15–20 metres (50–70 ft) high with a 20-metre -wide (70 ft) ditch in front of it. Built into this wall was a barracks capable of holding over 24,000 soldiers. The city had few reliable sources of ground water, but possessed a complex system to catch and channel rainwater and a large number of cisterns to store it.

The Carthaginians raised a strong and enthusiastic force to garrison the city from their citizenry and by freeing all slaves willing to fight. They also formed a 30,000 strong field army, which was placed under Hasdrubal, freshly released from his condemned cell. This army was based at Nepheris, 25 kilometres (16 mi) south of the city. Appian gives the strength of the Roman army which landed in Africa as 84,000 soldiers; modern historians estimate it at 40,000–50,000 men, of whom 4,000 were cavalry.

== Course of the war ==
=== 149 BC ===
The Roman army moved to Carthage and twice attempted to scale the city walls, from the sea and the landward sides, being repulsed both times, before settling down for a siege. Hasdrubal moved up his army and harassed the Roman supply lines and foraging parties. The Romans built two very large battering rams and partially broke down a section of the wall. They stormed the breach but fell into disorder while clambering through and were thrown back by the waiting Carthaginians. The Romans would have been in difficulty except for the actions of Scipio Aemilianus, (Note: Scipio Aemilianus was the adopted grandson of Scipio Africanus, the man who had won the Second Punic War for Rome by defeating Hannibal at the Battle of Zama, 160 kilometres (100 mi) south west of Carthage.) who was serving with the 4th Legion as a tribune – a middle-ranking military position. Rather than join the attack as ordered, Scipio held back and spaced his men along the partially demolished wall, and so was able to beat off the pursuing Carthaginians when the Romans in front of him fled back through the ranks of his unit.

Censorinus's camp was badly situated and by early summer was so pestiferous that it was moved to a healthier location. This, however, was not as defensible, and the Carthaginians inflicted losses on the Roman fleet with fire ships. Separately, a night attack was launched against Manilius's camp; a dangerous outcome for the Romans was again averted by Scipio's prompt action. The Romans made repetitions of these attacks more difficult by building additional field fortifications.

=== 148 BC ===
The Romans elected two new consuls in 148 BC, but only one of them was sent to Africa: Calpurnius Piso; Lucius Mancinus commanded the navy as his subordinate. He pulled back the close siege of Carthage to a looser blockade and attempted to mop up the other Carthaginian-supporting cities in the area but failed. Meanwhile, Hasdrubal, commander of the Carthaginian field army, overthrew the civilian leadership of Carthage and took command himself. A Numidian chief came over to the Carthaginians with 800 cavalry. Carthage allied with Andriscus, a pretender to the Macedonian throne, who invaded Roman Macedonia, defeated a Roman army, had himself crowned King Philip VI, and sparked the Fourth Macedonian War.

=== 147 BC ===
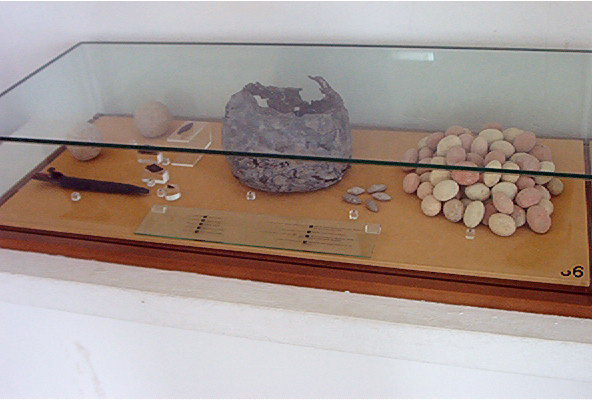
Arrowheads, remains of a dagger and stones for slingshots exhibited at the National Museum of Carthage

Scipio intended to stand in the 147 BC elections for the post of aedile; this was a natural progression for him and at age 36 or 37 he was too young to stand as consul, for which the minimum age requirement was 42. But the public demand to appoint him as consul, and so allow him to take charge of the African war, was so strong that the Senate put aside the age requirements for all posts for the year. There was considerable political manoeuvring behind the scenes, much of which is opaque in the sources, and it is not known to what extent, if any, Scipio helped orchestrate this outcome. In any event, he secured sole command in Africa, the usual right to conscript enough men to make up the numbers of the forces there, and the unusual entitlement to enroll volunteers.

Meanwhile, early in 147 BC Mancinius seized an unexpected opportunity to capture a sally port and forced 3,500 men into the city, 3,000 of whom were lightly armed and armoured sailors. Mancinius sent messages asking for reinforcements. Sources have Scipio arriving at Utica that evening to take up his post. He sailed overnight for Carthage and arrived just in time to evacuate Mancinius's hard-pressed force as it was expelled by a Carthaginian counterattack.

Scipio moved the Roman main camp back to near Carthage, closely observed by a Carthaginian detachment of 8,000. He made a speech demanding tighter discipline and dismissed those soldiers he considered ill-disciplined or poorly motivated. He then led a night march with a strong force that culminated in an assault against what the Romans considered to be a weak point in Carthage's main wall. A gate was seized and 4,000 Romans pushed into the city. Panicked in the dark, the Carthaginian defenders, after an initial fierce resistance, fled. However, Scipio decided that his position would be indefensible once the Carthaginians reorganised themselves in daylight, and so withdrew. Hasdrubal, horrified at the way the Carthaginian defences had collapsed, had Roman prisoners tortured to death on the walls, in view of the Roman army. He was reinforcing the will to resist in the Carthaginian citizens; from this point there could be no possibility of negotiation or even surrender. Some members of the city council denounced his actions and Hasdrubal had them too put to death and took full control of the city.

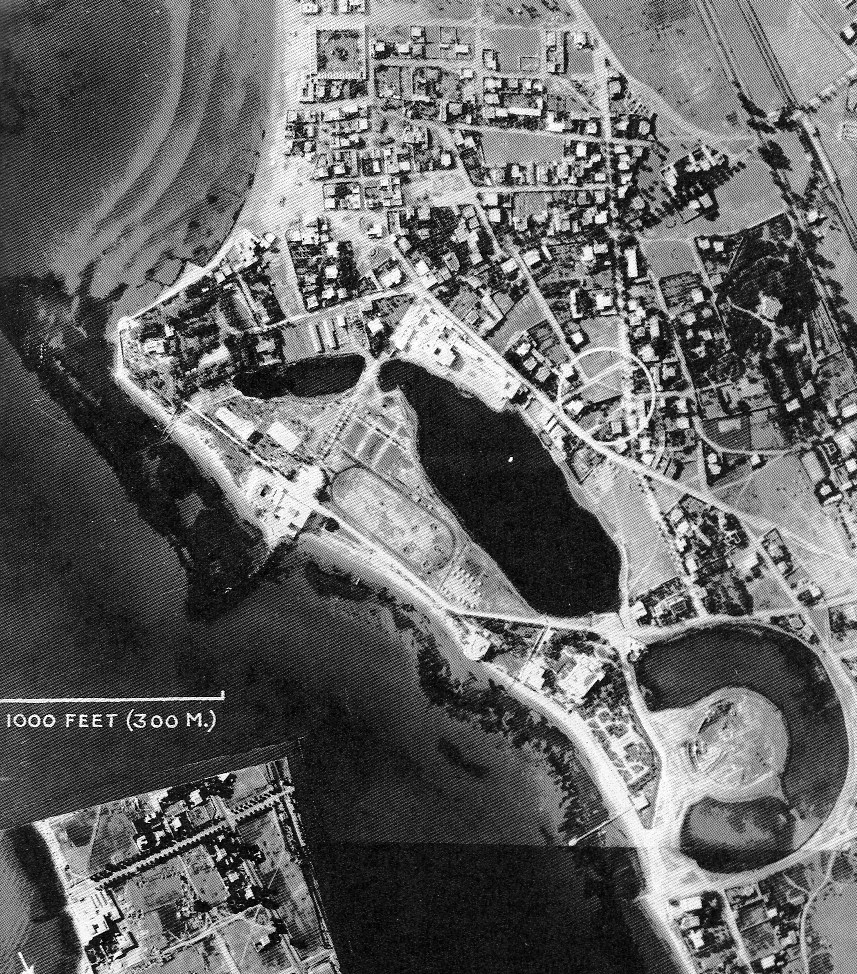
A photograph of the remains of the naval base of the city of Carthage. The remains of the mercantile harbour are in the centre and those of the military harbour are bottom right.

The renewed close siege cut off landward entry to the city, but a tight seaward interdiction was all but impossible with the naval technology of the time. Frustrated at the amount of food being shipped into the city, Scipio started to build an immense mole to cut off access to the harbour. As work on this progressed, the Carthaginians responded by cutting a new channel from their harbour to the sea. They had built a new fleet of 50 triremes – medium-sized, manoeuvrable, oared warships – and a large number of smaller ships since sacrificing their original fleet two years before. Once the channel was complete this sailed out, taking the Romans by surprise. A few days were necessary to trim the new-built ships and to train the new crews who had not been to sea for over two years and were out of the habit of operating together, and by the time the Carthaginians felt ready to give battle the Romans had concentrated their own naval forces. In the engagement which followed, the Carthaginians held their own, with their lighter craft proving difficult for the Roman ships to deal with. Breaking off the engagement, the Carthaginian triremes were covering the withdrawal of their lighter vessels when a collision blocked the new channel. With the Carthaginian ships pinned against the city's sea wall with no room to manoeuvre, the Romans sank or captured many of them before the blockage was cleared and the Carthaginian survivors were able to escape back into harbour.

The Romans now attempted to advance against the Carthaginian defences in the harbour area. Carthaginians swam across the harbour at night and set fire to several siege engines and many legionaries panicked and fled. Scipio intercepted them in the dark; when they disregarded his orders to halt he had his mounted bodyguard attack them. Nevertheless, the Romans eventually gained control of the quay and constructed a brick wall as high as the city wall. This took months to complete, but once in place it enabled 4,000 Romans to shoot onto the Carthaginian ramparts from short range.

=== 146 BC ===
Scipio's position as the Roman commander in Africa was extended for a year in 146 BC, and in the spring he launched the final assault. It came from the harbour area and Hasdrubal, expecting it, set fire to the nearby warehouses. Despite this, a Roman advance party broke through to the military harbour and captured it. The main assault force reached the city's main square, where the legions camped overnight. The next morning Scipio led 4,000 men to link up with the group at the military harbour; this group was delayed when they diverted to strip the gold from the Temple of Apollo. Scipio and his officers were helpless to prevent them and furious. The Carthaginians did not take advantage, having withdrawn to defensive positions.

Having regrouped, the Romans systematically worked their way through the residential part of the city, killing everyone they encountered and firing the buildings behind them. At times, the Romans progressed from rooftop to rooftop, to prevent missiles being hurled down on them. It took six more days to clear the city of resistance, and on the last day Scipio agreed to accept prisoners. The last holdouts, including 900 Roman deserters in Carthaginian service, fought on from the Temple of Eshmoun and burnt it down around themselves when all hope was gone. At this point, Hasdrubal surrendered to Scipio on the promise of his life and freedom. Hasdrubal's wife, watching from a rampart, then blessed Scipio, cursed her husband, and walked into the temple with her children, to burn to death.

There were 50,000 Carthaginian prisoners, a small proportion of the pre-war population, who were sold into slavery. After the final week of fighting, Scipio gave the city over to the soldiers to plunder. After this, a commission of ten senators arrived, ordering Scipio to destroy whatever remained of Carthage and decreed nobody was allowed to settle there or rebuild; however, it was not forbidden to go upon the ground nor was the land cursed, the notion that Roman forces then sowed the city with salt is a 19th-century invention. Many of the religious items and cult-statues which Carthage had pillaged from Sicilian cities and temples over the centuries were returned with great ceremony.

== Aftermath ==
Scipio was awarded the agnomen "Africanus", as his adoptive grandfather had been. The formerly Carthaginian territories were annexed by Rome and reconstituted to become the Roman province of Africa with Utica as its capital. The province became a major source of grain and other foodstuffs. Numerous large Punic cities, such as those in Mauretania, were taken over by the Romans, although they were permitted to retain their Punic system of government. A century later, the site of Carthage was rebuilt as a Roman city by Julius Caesar, and would become one of the main cities of Roman Africa by the time of the Empire. The Punic language continued to be spoken in north Africa until the 7th century.

The ruins of Carthage lie 16 kilometres (10 mi) east of Tunis on the North African coast. A symbolic peace treaty was signed by Ugo Vetere and Chedli Klibi, the mayors of Rome and the modern city of Carthage, respectively, on 5 February 1985, 2,131 years after the war ended. Due to the war's nature as being defined by political revenge, and the subsequent massacre of the Carthaginians, and expulsion of its population, the war has sometimes been labelled a genocide.

Archaeological Site of Carthage
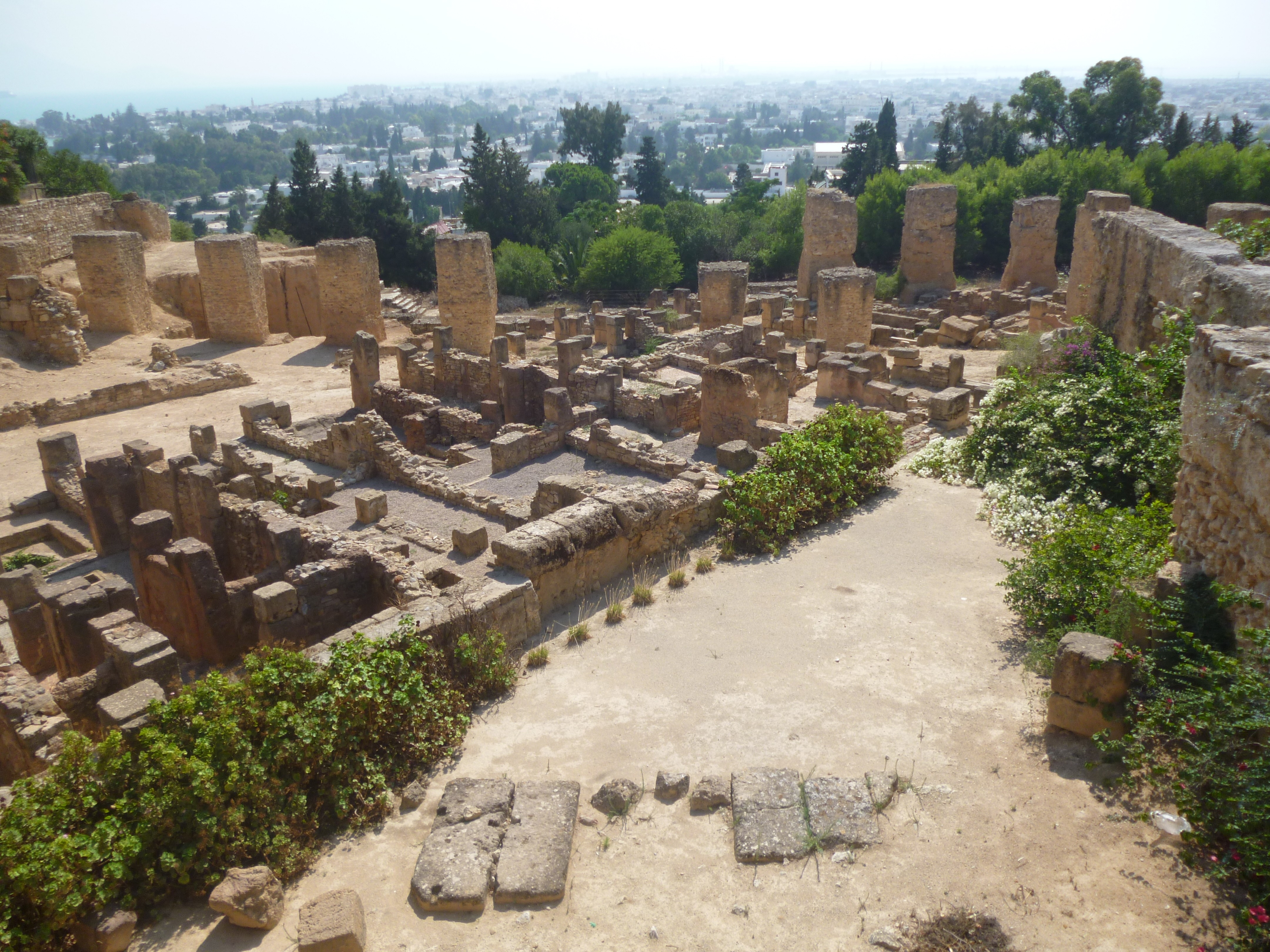

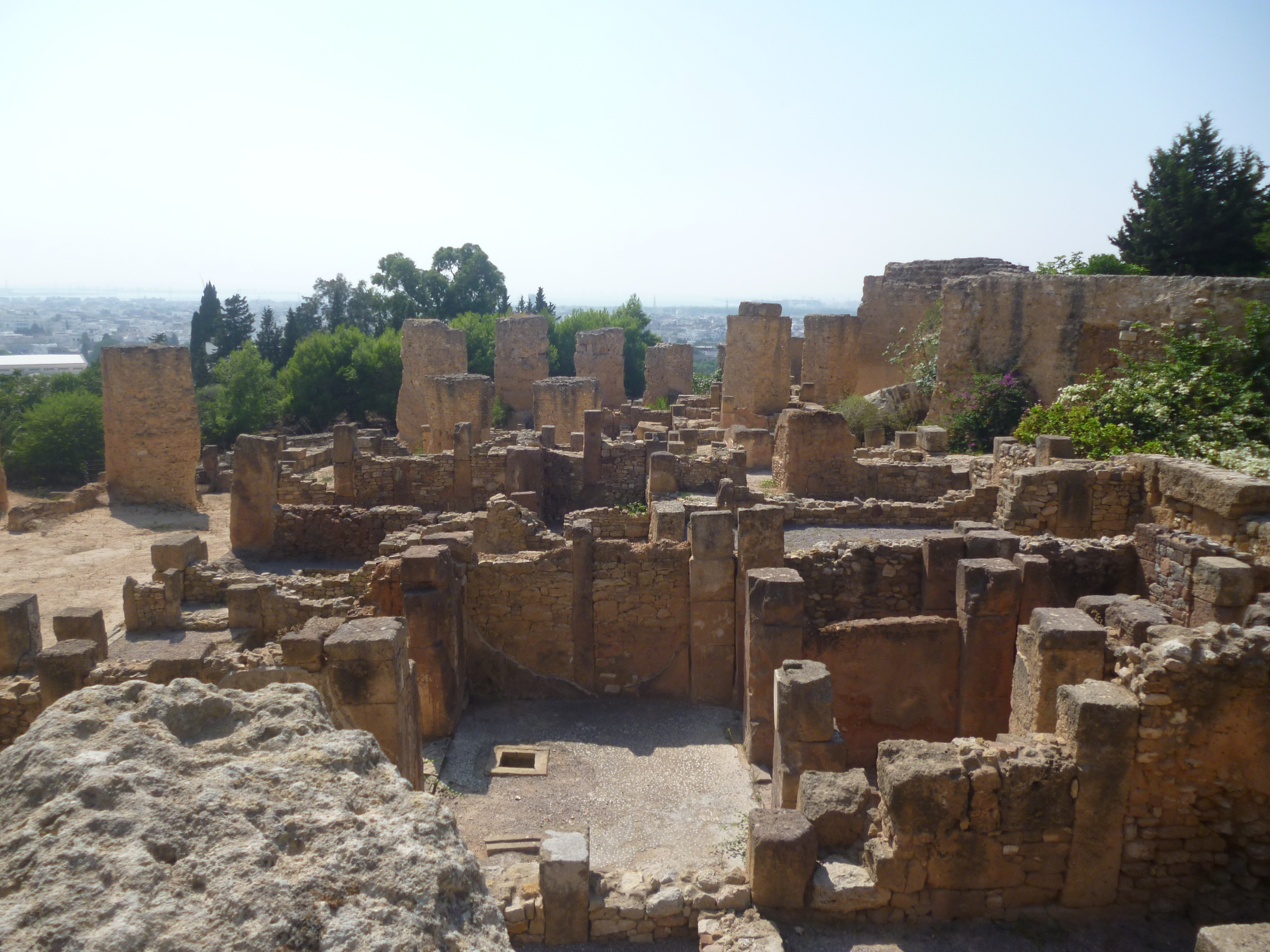

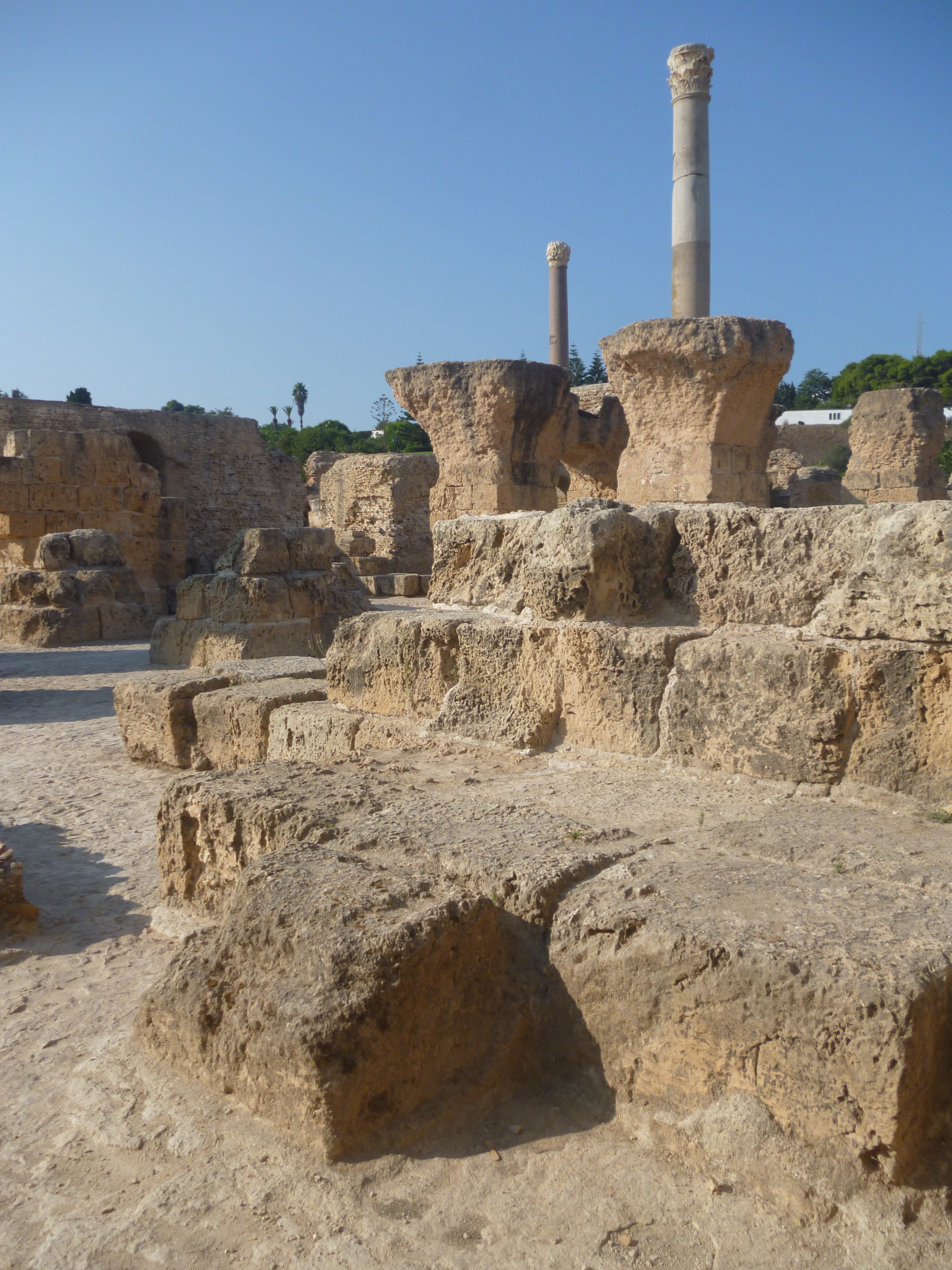

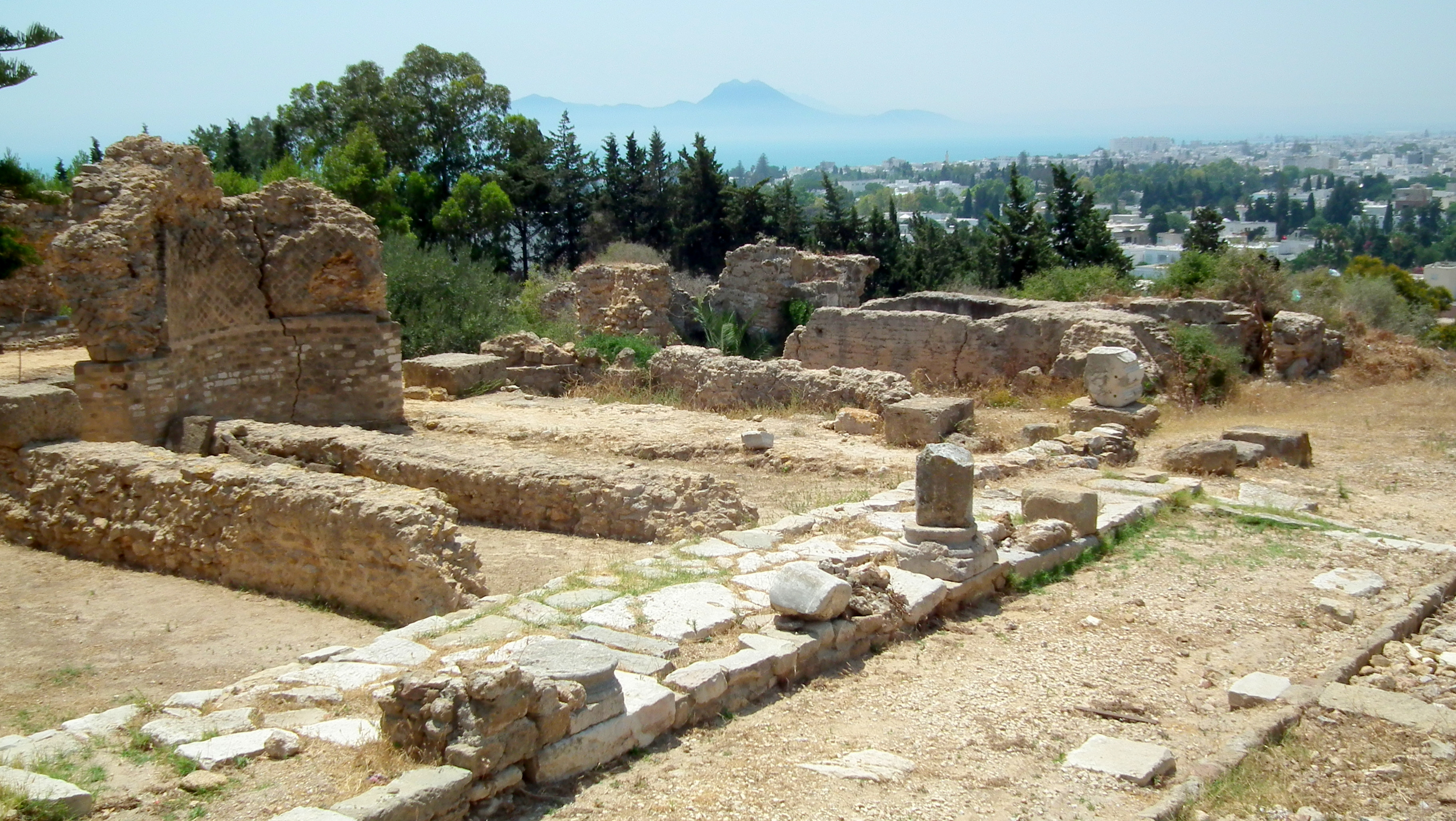

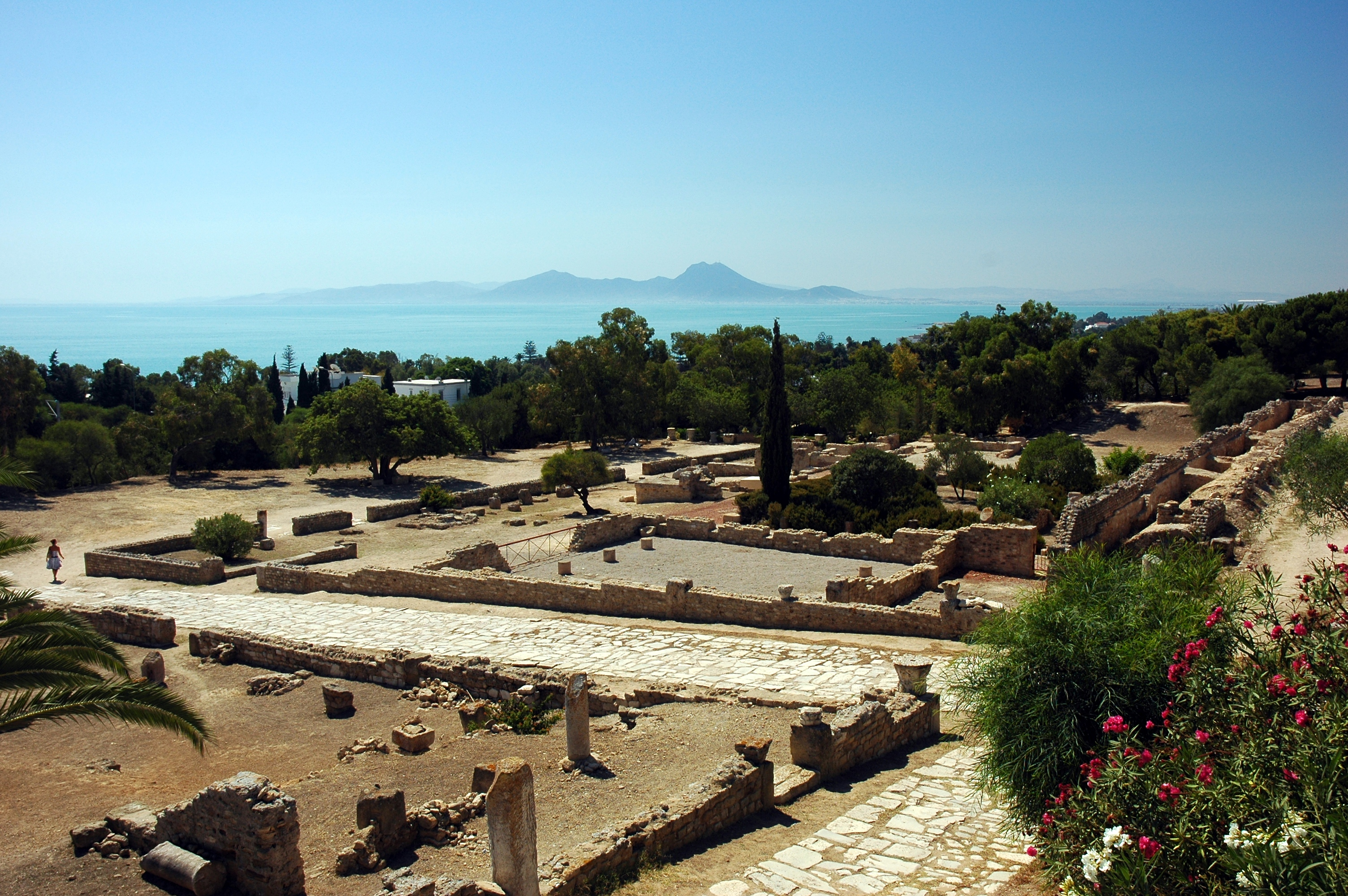

== Sources ==
- Bagnall, Nigel (1999). The Punic Wars: Rome, Carthage and the Struggle for the Mediterranean. London: Pimlico. ISBN 978-0-7126-6608-4.
- Le Bohec, Yann (2015) [2011]. "The "Third Punic War": The Siege of Carthage (148–146 BC)". In Hoyos, Dexter (ed.). A Companion to the Punic Wars. Chichester, West Sussex: John Wiley & Sons. pp. 430–446. ISBN 978-1-1190-2550-4.
- Champion, Craige B. (2015) [2011]. "Polybius and the Punic Wars". In Hoyos, Dexter (ed.). A Companion to the Punic Wars. Chichester, West Sussex: John Wiley & Sons. pp. 95–110. ISBN 978-1-1190-2550-4.
- Curry, Andrew (2012). "The Weapon That Changed History". Archaeology. 65 (1): 32–37. JSTOR 41780760.
- Fakhri, Habib (1985). "Rome and Carthage Sign Peace Treaty Ending Punic Wars After 2,131 Years". AP News. Associated Press.
- Fantar, M'hamed-Hassine (2015) [2011]. "Death and Transfiguration: Punic Culture after 146". In Hoyos, Dexter (ed.). A Companion to the Punic Wars. Chichester, West Sussex: John Wiley & Sons. pp. 449–466. ISBN 978-1-1190-2550-4.
- Goldsworthy, Adrian (2006). The Fall of Carthage: The Punic Wars 265–146 BC. London: Phoenix. ISBN 978-0-304-36642-2.
- Hau, Lisa (2016). Moral History from Herodotus to Diodorus Siculus. Edinburgh: Edinburgh University Press. ISBN 978-1-4744-1107-3.
- Jouhaud, Edmond Jules René (1968). Historie de l'Afrique du Nord [History of North Africa] (in French). Paris: Éditions des Deux Cogs dÓr. OCLC 2553949.
- Kunze, Claudia (2015) [2011]. "Carthage and Numidia, 201–149". In Hoyos, Dexter (ed.). A Companion to the Punic Wars. Chichester, West Sussex: John Wiley & Sons. pp. 395–411. ISBN 978-1-1190-2550-4.
- Lazenby, John (1996). The First Punic War: A Military History. Stanford, California: Stanford University Press. ISBN 978-0-8047-2673-3.
- Miles, Richard (2011). Carthage Must be Destroyed. London: Penguin Books. ISBN 978-0-14-101809-6.
- Mineo, Bernard (2015) [2011]. "Principal Literary Sources for the Punic Wars (apart from Polybius)". In Hoyos, Dexter (ed.). A Companion to the Punic Wars. Chichester, West Sussex: John Wiley & Sons. pp. 111–128. ISBN 978-1-1190-2550-4.
- Pollard, Elizabeth (2015). Worlds Together Worlds Apart. New York: W. W. Norton. ISBN 978-0-393-92207-3.
- Purcell, Nicholas (1995). "On the Sacking of Carthage and Corinth". In Innes, Doreen; Hine, Harry; Pelling, Christopher (eds.). Ethics and Rhetoric: Classical Essays for Donald Russell on his Seventy Fifth Birthday. Oxford: Clarendon Press. pp. 133–148. ISBN 978-0-19-814962-0.
- Richardson, John (2015) [2011]. "Spain, Africa, and Rome after Carthage". In Hoyos, Dexter (ed.). A Companion to the Punic Wars. Chichester, West Sussex: John Wiley & Sons. pp. 467–482. ISBN 978-1-1190-2550-4.
- Ridley, Ronald (1986). "To Be Taken with a Pinch of Salt: The Destruction of Carthage". Classical Philology. 81 (2): 140–146. doi:10.1086/366973. JSTOR 269786. S2CID 161696751.
- Ripley, George; Dana, Charles (1858–1863). "Carthage". The New American Cyclopædia: a Popular Dictionary of General Knowledge. Vol. 4. New York: D. Appleton. p. 497. OCLC 1173144180.
- Scullard, Howard (1955). "Carthage". Greece & Rome. 2 (3): 98–107. doi:10.1017/S0017383500022166. JSTOR 641578. S2CID 248519024.
- Scullard, Howard H. (2002). A History of the Roman World, 753 to 146 BC. London: Routledge. ISBN 978-0-415-30504-4.
- Scullard, Howard H. (2006) [1989]. "Carthage and Rome". In Walbank, F. W.; Astin, A. E.; Frederiksen, M. W.; Ogilvie, R. M. (eds.). Cambridge Ancient History. Vol. 7, Part 2 (2nd ed.). Cambridge: Cambridge University Press. pp. 486–569. ISBN 978-0-521-23446-7.
- Sidwell, Keith C.; Jones, Peter V. (1998). The World of Rome: an Introduction to Roman Culture. Cambridge: Cambridge University Press. ISBN 978-0-521-38600-5.
- Shutt, Rowland (1938). "Polybius: A Sketch". Greece & Rome. 8 (22): 50–57. doi:10.1017/S001738350000588X. JSTOR 642112. S2CID 162905667.
- Tipps, G. K. (1985). "The Battle of Ecnomus". Historia: Zeitschrift für Alte Geschichte. 34 (4): 432–465. JSTOR 4435938.
- "Archaeological Site of Carthage". UNESCO. 2020.
- Walbank, F. W. (1990). Polybius. Vol. 1. Berkeley: University of California Press. ISBN 978-0-520-06981-7.
- Whittaker, C. R. (1996). "Roman Africa: Augustus to Vespasian". In Bowman, A.; Champlin, E.; Lintott, A. (eds.). The Cambridge Ancient History. Vol. X. Cambridge: Cambridge University Press. pp. 595–96. doi:10.1017/CHOL9780521264303.022. ISBN 9781139054386.
