= Phameas =

Carthaginian army officer, 2nd century BC

Phameas (Ancient Greek: Φαμέας; fl. 2nd Century BC), sometimes also known as Hamilcar or Himilco Phameas, was a Carthaginian officer during the Third Punic War.

He is first mentioned in the preliminary hostilities between Rome and Carthage (149 BC), as either a notable cavalry leader or the leader of the Carthaginian cavalry. Greco-Roman historians speak positively of him, with Polybius depicting him as "in the prime of life, of great personal vigor, and - what is most important in a soldier - a good and bold rider". Appian calls him "a man eager for fighting".

His forces carried out several attacks on disorganised and scattered Roman units and scouting parties, causing much damage among Roman forces. One of his more well-known engagements was the Battle of Lake Tunis, where he annihilated several foraging parties sent by consul Lucius Marcius Censorinus, and playing a role in the Carthaginian repulse of the Roman assault. However, he was unable to break the well-organised groups of Scipio Aemilianus.

The Romans eventually managed to curtail his activities by using their Numidian allies, led by Gulussa, to assault his hidden raiding bases.

In early 148 BC, Scipio and Phameas came to an understanding, and the latter defected to the Romans, along with 2,200 of his cavalry. These cavalrymen would be used by the Romans in conjunction with the Numidians in raids on Hasdrubal the Boetharch's forces defending Carthage, and to defend Manius Manilius' men retreating from Nepheris. Phameas would aid the Romans as a skilled commander for the rest of the war, raiding Carthaginian forces defending the city of Carthage. In one notable raid, he joined Scipio and Gulussa in seizing a supply depot at the plain of Great Barathrum, returning with "a great quantity of spoils and provisions".

In early 148 BC, Manilius was replaced as consul by Calpurnius Piso, and so ordered Scipio back to Rome, who took Phameas as his companion.

Upon arriving in Rome, Phameas was richly rewarded for his defection. Appian writes that he was given:

a purple robe with gold clasps, a horse with gold trappings, a complete suit of armor, and 10,000 drachmas of silver money, ... 100 minas of silver plate and a tent completely furnished.

— Appian, The Punic Wars,

He is last mentioned in the sources as heading back to Africa to continue serving the Romans in the war. After this, he does not appear. It is possible that he was given Roman citizenship.
