= Third Punic War =

War between Rome and Carthage (149–146 BC)

- Part of the Punic Wars
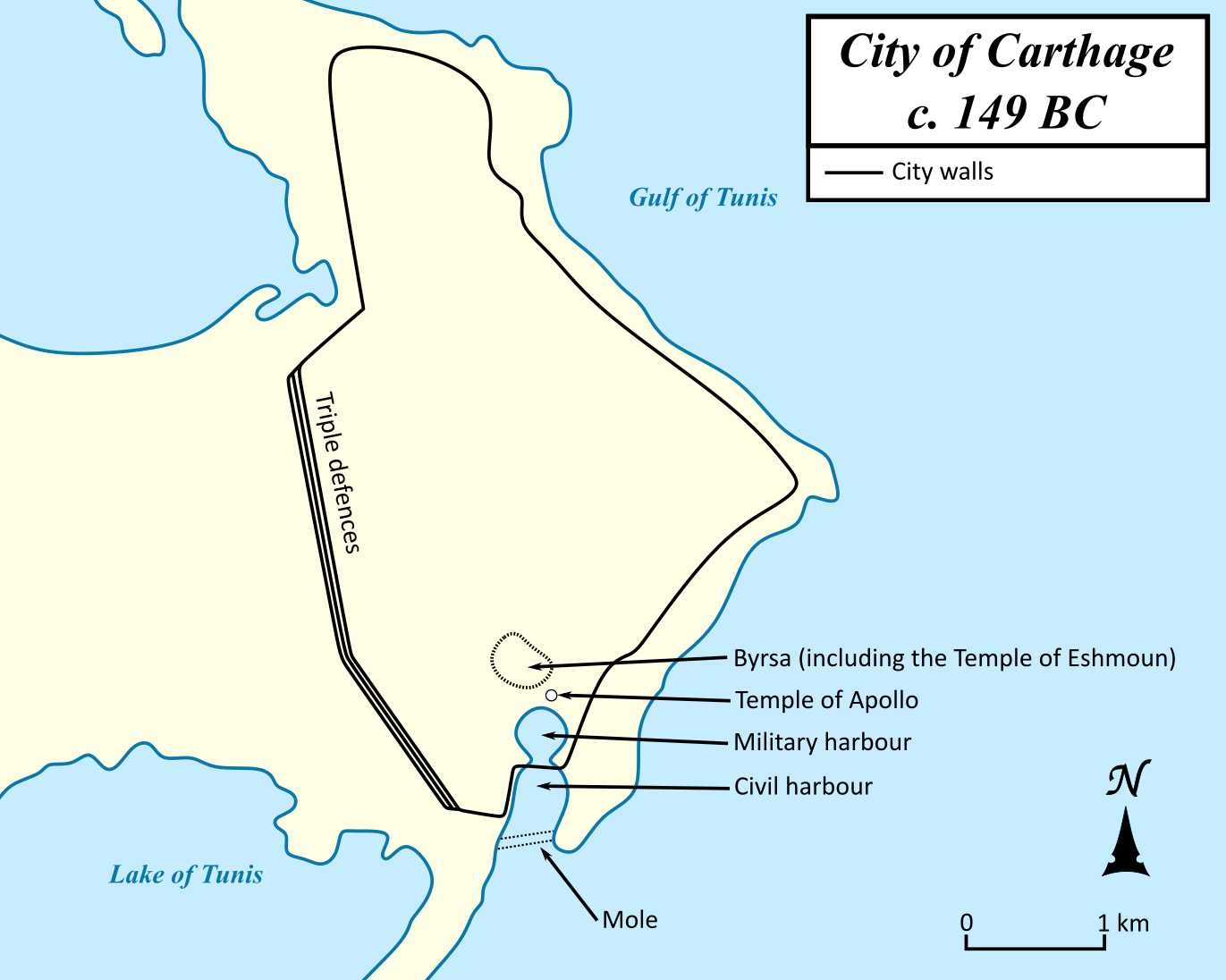
- The defences of the city of Carthage
Date	149–146 BC (3 years)
Location	Carthaginian territory (Modern-day Tunisia)
Result	Roman victory; Destruction of Carthage

Belligerents
Rome	Carthage

Commanders and leaders
Scipio Aemilianus; Manius Manilius; Lucius Censorinus; Lucius Piso	Hasdrubal (surrendered); Himilco Phameas

Strength
36,000–46,000 infantry; 4,000 cavalry	20,000 or more soldiers; Armed civilians

Casualties and losses
Heavy	Up to 750,000 killed, including civilians; 50,000 survivors enslaved

The Third Punic War (149–146 BC) was the third and last of the Punic Wars fought between Carthage and Rome. The war was fought entirely within Carthaginian territory, in what is now northern Tunisia. When the Second Punic War ended in 201 BC one of the terms of the peace treaty prohibited Carthage from waging war without Rome's permission. Rome's ally, King Masinissa of Numidia, exploited this to repeatedly raid and seize Carthaginian territory with impunity. In 149 BC Carthage sent an army, under Hasdrubal, against Masinissa, the treaty notwithstanding. The campaign ended in disaster as the Battle of Oroscopa ended with a Carthaginian defeat and the surrender of the Carthaginian army. Anti-Carthaginian factions in Rome used the illicit military action as a pretext to prepare a punitive expedition.

Later in 149 BC a large Roman army landed at Utica in North Africa. The Carthaginians hoped to appease the Romans, but despite the Carthaginians surrendering all of their weapons, the Romans pressed on to besiege the city of Carthage. The Roman campaign suffered repeated setbacks through 149 BC, only alleviated by Scipio Aemilianus, a middle-ranking officer, distinguishing himself several times. A new Roman commander took over in 148 BC and fared equally badly. At the annual election of Roman magistrates in the spring of 147 BC the public support for Scipio was so great that the usual age restrictions were lifted to allow him to be appointed consul and commander in Africa.

Scipio's term commenced with two Carthaginian successes, but he tightened the siege and started to build a large mole to prevent supplies from getting into Carthage via blockade runners. The Carthaginians had partially rebuilt their fleet, and it sortied, to the Romans' surprise. After an indecisive engagement, the Carthaginians mismanaged their withdrawal and lost many ships. The Romans then built a large brick structure in the harbour area that dominated the city wall. Once this was complete, Scipio led a strong force that stormed the camp of Carthage's field army and forced most of the towns and cities still supporting Carthage to surrender. In early 146 BC the Romans launched their final assault and, over six days, systematically destroyed the city and killed its inhabitants; only on the last day did they take prisoners, 50,000 of them, who were sold into slavery. The conquered Carthaginian territories became the Roman province of Africa, with Utica as its capital. It was a century before the site of Carthage was rebuilt as a Roman city.

== Primary sources ==
The main source for most aspects of the Punic Wars (Note: The term Punic comes from the Latin word Punicus (or Poenicus), meaning "Carthaginian" and is a reference to the Carthaginians' Phoenician origins.) is the historian Polybius (c. 200 – c. 118 BC), a Greek sent to Rome in 167 BC as a hostage. His works include a now-lost manual on military tactics, but he is best known for The Histories, written sometime after 146 BC. He accompanied his patron and friend, the Roman general Scipio Aemilianus, in North Africa during the Third Punic War; this causes the normally reliable Polybius to recount Scipio's actions in a favourable light. In addition, significant portions of The Histories' account of the Third Punic War have been lost.

The account of the Roman annalist Livy, who relied heavily on Polybius, is much used by modern historians of the Punic Wars, but all that survives of his account of events after 167 BC is a list of contents. Other ancient accounts of the Third Punic War or its participants which have also been largely lost include those of Plutarch, Dio Cassius and the Greek Diodorus Siculus. Modern historians also use the account of the 2nd-century AD Greek Appian. The modern historian Bernard Mineo states that it "is the only complete and continuous account of this war". It is thought to have been largely based on Polybius's account, but several problems with it have been identified. These issues mean that of the three Punic Wars, the third is the one about which the least is reliably known. Other sources include coins, inscriptions, archaeological evidence and empirical evidence from reconstructions.

== Background ==
In the mid-2nd century BC Rome was the dominant power in the Mediterranean region, while Carthage was a large city-state in the north east of what is now Tunisia. Carthage and Rome had fought the 23-year-long First Punic War from 264 to 241 BC and the 17-year-long Second Punic War between 218 and 201 BC. Both wars ended with Roman victories; the Second when the Roman general Scipio Africanus defeated Hannibal, the premier Carthaginian general of the war, at the Battle of Zama, 160 kilometres (100 mi) south-west of Carthage. Africanus imposed a peace treaty on the Carthaginians which stripped them of their overseas territories and some of their African ones. An indemnity of 10,000 silver talents (Note: Several different "talents" are known from antiquity. The ones referred to in this article are all Euboic (or Euboeic) talents. At the time of the Second Punic War 10,000 talents was approximately 269,000 kg (265 long tons) of silver.) was to be paid over 50 years. Hostages were taken and Carthage was prohibited from waging war outside Africa—and could wage war in Africa only with Rome's express permission. Many senior Carthaginians wanted to reject the treaty, but Hannibal spoke strongly in its favour and it was accepted in spring 201 BC. Henceforth, it was clear that Carthage was politically subordinate to Rome.

Map of approximate extent of Numidian, Carthaginian and Roman territory in 150 BC

At the end of the war Masinissa, an ally of Rome, emerged as by far the most powerful ruler among the Numidians, the indigenous population which controlled much of what is now Algeria and Tunisia. Over the following 50 years, he repeatedly took advantage of Carthage's inability to protect its possessions. Whenever Carthage petitioned Rome for redress or permission to take military action, Rome backed Masinissa and refused. Masinissa's seizures of and raids into Carthaginian territory became increasingly flagrant. In 151 BC Carthage raised a large army commanded by the previously unrecorded general Hasdrubal and, the treaty notwithstanding, counter-attacked the Numidians. The campaign ended in disaster at the Battle of Oroscopa and the army surrendered. Many Carthaginians were subsequently massacred by the Numidians. Hasdrubal escaped to Carthage, where, in an attempt to placate Rome, he was condemned to death.

Carthage paid off its indemnity in 151 BC and was prospering economically but was no military threat to Rome. Nevertheless, there had long been a faction within the Roman Senate that had wished to take further military action against Carthage. For example, the dislike of Carthage by the senior senator Cato was so well known that since the 18th century (AD), he has been credited with ending all of his speeches with Carthago delenda est ("Carthage must be destroyed"). The opposing faction included Scipio Nasica, who argued that fear of a strong enemy such as Carthage would keep the common people in check and avoid social division. Cato was a member of an embassy to Carthage, probably in 153 BC, and noted her growing economy and strength; Nasica was likely a member of the same embassy. Using the illicit Carthaginian military action as a pretext, Rome began preparing a punitive expedition.

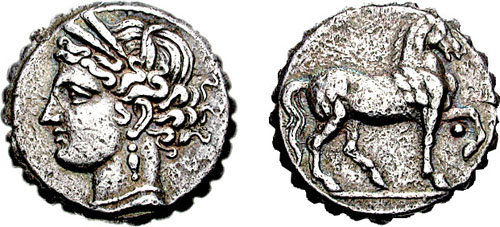
A silver double shekel from Carthage's last minting of coins before its destruction

Modern scholars have advanced several theories as to why Rome was eager for war. These include: a Roman fear of Carthaginian commercial competition; a desire to forestall a wider war which might have broken out with the death of Masinissa, who was aged 89 at the time; the factional use of Carthage as a political "bogeyman", irrespective of its true power; a greed for glory and loot; and a desire to quash a political system which Rome considered anathema. No consensus has been reached regarding these and other hypotheses. Carthaginian embassies attempted to negotiate with Rome, which responded evasively. The large North African port city of Utica, some 55 km (34 mi) north of Carthage, went over to Rome in 149 BC. Aware that Utica's harbour would greatly facilitate any assault on Carthage, the Senate and the People's Assembly of Rome declared war on Carthage.

The Romans elected two men each year, known as consuls, as senior magistrates, who at time of war would each lead an army; on occasion their term of office was extended. A large Roman army landed at Utica in 149 BC under both consuls for the year, Manius Manilius commanding the army and Lucius Marcius Censorinus the fleet. The Carthaginians continued to attempt to appease Rome and sent an embassy to Utica. The consuls demanded that they hand over all weaponry; reluctantly the Carthaginians did so. Large convoys took enormous stocks of equipment from Carthage to Utica. Surviving records state that these included 200,000 sets of armour and 2,000 catapults. Carthage's warships all sailed to Utica and were burnt in the harbour. Once Carthage was disarmed, Censorinus made the further demand that the Carthaginians abandon their city and relocate 16 km (10 mi) away from the sea; Carthage would then be destroyed. The Carthaginians abandoned negotiations and prepared to defend their city.

== Opposing forces ==
The city of Carthage was unusually large for the time: modern scholars give population estimates ranging from 90,000 to 800,000. Any of these would make Carthage one of the most populous cities in the Mediterranean area at the time. It was strongly fortified with walls of more than 35 km (20 mi) circumference. Defending the main approach from the land were three lines of defences, of which the strongest was a brick-built wall 9 metres (30 ft) wide and 15–20 metres (50–70 ft) high with a 20-metre-wide (70 ft) ditch in front of it. Built into this wall was a barracks capable of holding over 24,000 soldiers. The city had few reliable sources of ground water but possessed a complex system to catch and channel rainwater and many cisterns to store it.

The Carthaginians raised a strong and enthusiastic force to garrison the city from their citizenry and by freeing all slaves willing to fight. They also formed a field army at least 20,000 strong, which was placed under Hasdrubal, freshly released from his condemned cell. This army was based at Nepheris, 25 km (16 mi) south of Carthage. Appian gives the strength of the Roman army which landed in Africa as 84,000 soldiers; modern historians estimate it at 40,000–50,000 men, of whom 4,000 were cavalry.

== Course of the war ==
=== 149 BC ===
The Roman army moved to Carthage, unsuccessfully attempted to scale the city walls, and settled down for a siege. They set up two camps under command of legates: Censorinus' had the primary role of protecting the beached Roman ships and Manilius's housed the Roman legions. Hasdrubal moved up his army to harass the Roman supply lines and foraging parties. The Romans launched another assault on the city but were repulsed again. Scipio Aemilianus, the adopted grandson of Scipio Africanus, who was serving as a tribune – a middle-ranking military position – held back his men and was able to deploy them to beat off the pursuing Carthaginians, preventing heavy losses.

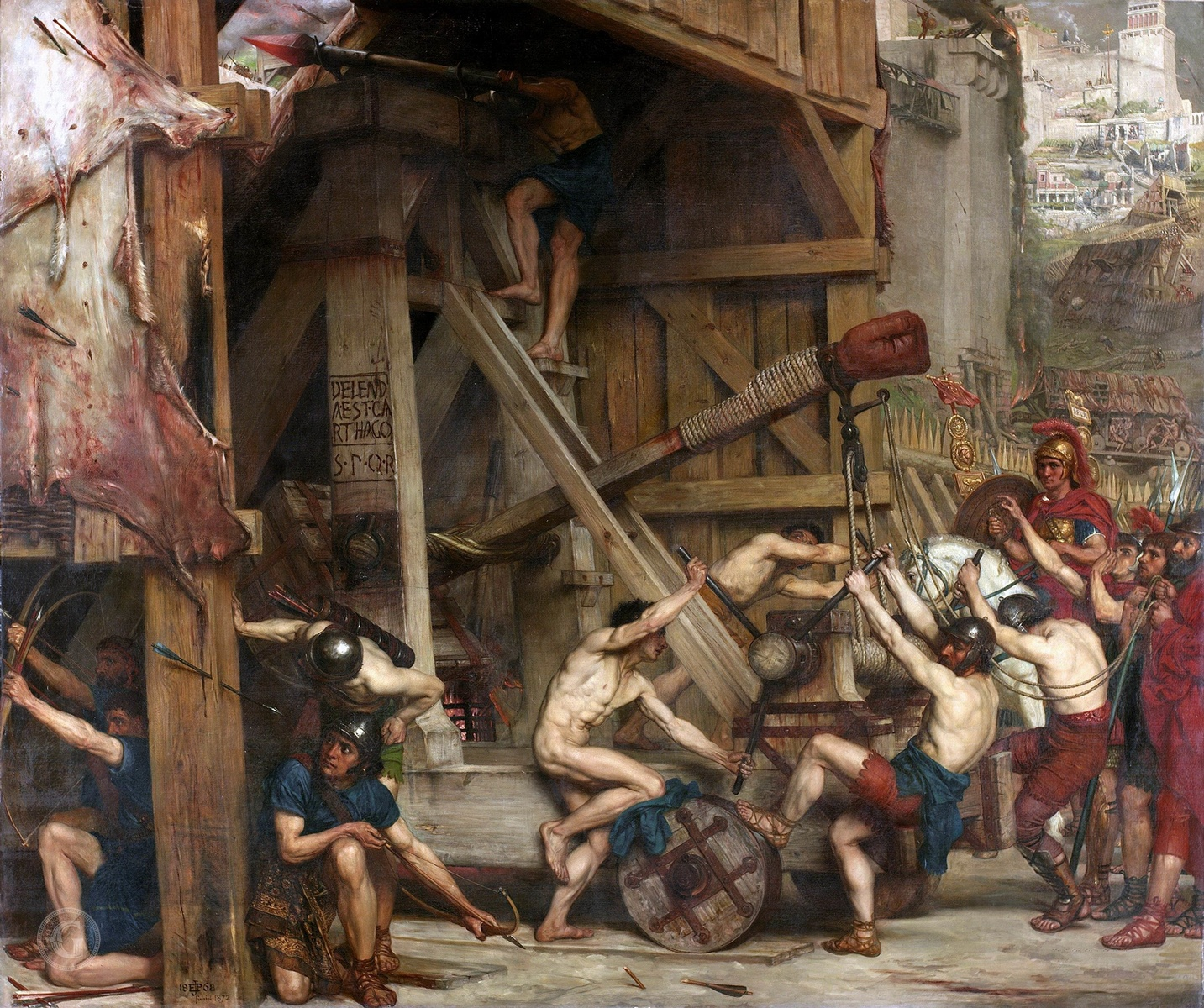
Catapulta by Edward Poynter, 1868; modern depiction of a Roman siege engine during the siege of Carthage

The camp established by Censorinus was badly situated and by early summer was so pestiferous that it was moved to a healthier location. This was not as defensible, and the Carthaginians inflicted losses on the Roman fleet with fireships. The Romans then made these attacks more difficult by building additional fortifications. Nevertheless, the Carthaginians repeatedly attacked the camps. In often confused fighting Scipio distinguished himself further by his role in thwarting these; the discipline which he imposed on his troops was in contrast with the behaviour of most of the rest of the Roman army.

Manilius decided to strike against the Carthaginians' main camp near Nepheris, despite its strong position and fortifications. Arriving there, Manilius ordered an immediate assault, against Scipio's advice. This initially went well, but the Romans advanced into an untenable position. When they attempted to withdraw, the Carthaginians counterattacked, inflicting heavy casualties. Scipio led 300 cavalrymen in a series of limited and well-disciplined charges and threats which caused the Carthaginians to pause long enough for most of the infantry to complete their retreat. That night Scipio led his cavalry back to rescue a trapped group of Romans. The Roman column retreated to its camp near Carthage, where a committee from the Senate had arrived to evaluate Scipio and Manilius' progress. Scipio's performance was prominent in their subsequent report. Scipio made contact with several of the leaders of Carthage's Numidian cavalry, then joined a second, better-planned expedition led by Manilius against Hasdrubal at Nepheris. Despite the greater forethought, the Romans made no progress, although one of the Numidians contacted by Scipio did defect to the Romans with 2,200 men. Manilius withdrew after the Romans ran out of food and Scipio led the Romans' new allies on a successful foraging expedition.

=== 148 BC ===
The Romans elected two new consuls in 148 BC, but only one of them was sent to Africa: Lucius Calpurnius Piso Caesoninus; Lucius Hostilius Mancinus commanded the navy as his subordinate. He pulled back the close siege of Carthage to a looser blockade and attempted to mop up the other Carthaginian-supporting cities in the area. He failed: Neapolis surrendered and was subsequently sacked, but Aspis withstood assaults from both the Roman army and navy, while Hippo was fruitlessly besieged. A Carthaginian sortie from Hippo destroyed the Roman siege engines, causing the Romans to break off the campaign and go into winter quarters. Hasdrubal, already in charge of the Carthaginian field army, overthrew the civilian leadership of Carthage and took command himself. Carthage allied with Andriscus, a pretender to the Macedonian throne. Andriscus had invaded Roman Macedonia, defeated a Roman army, had himself crowned King Philip VI and sparked the Fourth Macedonian War.

=== 147 BC ===
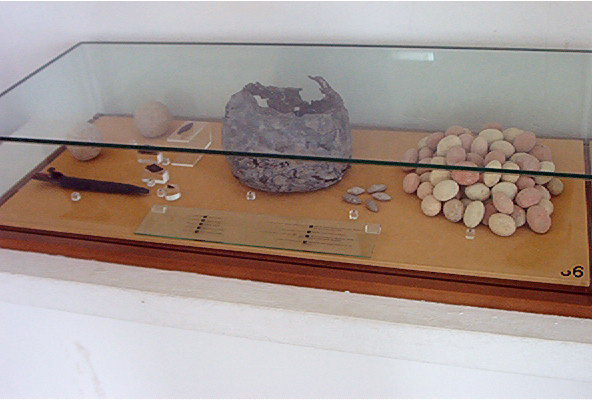
Arrowheads, remains of a dagger and stones for slings exhibited at the National Museum of Carthage

Scipio intended to stand in the 147 BC elections for the post of aedile, which was a natural progression for him. Aged 36 or 37, he was too young to stand as consul, for which by the Lex Villia the minimum age was 41. There was considerable political manoeuvring behind the scenes. Scipio and his partisans played on his successes over the previous two years and the fact that it was his adoptive grandfather, Scipio Africanus, who had sealed Roman victory in Africa in the Second Punic War. Public demand to appoint him as consul and so allow him to take charge of the African war, was so strong that the Senate put aside the age requirements for all posts for the year. Scipio was elected consul and appointed to sole command in Africa; usually theatres were allocated to the two consuls by lot. He was granted the usual right to conscript enough men to make up the numbers of the forces there and the unusual entitlement to enroll volunteers.

Scipio moved the Romans' main camp back to near Carthage, closely observed by a Carthaginian detachment of 8,000. He made a speech demanding tighter discipline and dismissed those soldiers he considered ill-disciplined or poorly motivated. He then led a successful night attack and broke into the city with 4,000 men. Panicked in the dark, the Carthaginian defenders, after an initial fierce resistance, fled. Scipio decided that his position would be indefensible once the Carthaginians reorganised themselves in daylight and so withdrew. Hasdrubal, horrified at the way the Carthaginian defences had collapsed, had Roman prisoners tortured to death on the walls, in sight of the Roman army. He was reinforcing the will to resist in the Carthaginian citizens; from this point, there could be no possibility of negotiation or even surrender. Some members of the city council denounced his actions and Hasdrubal had them too put to death and took full control of the city.

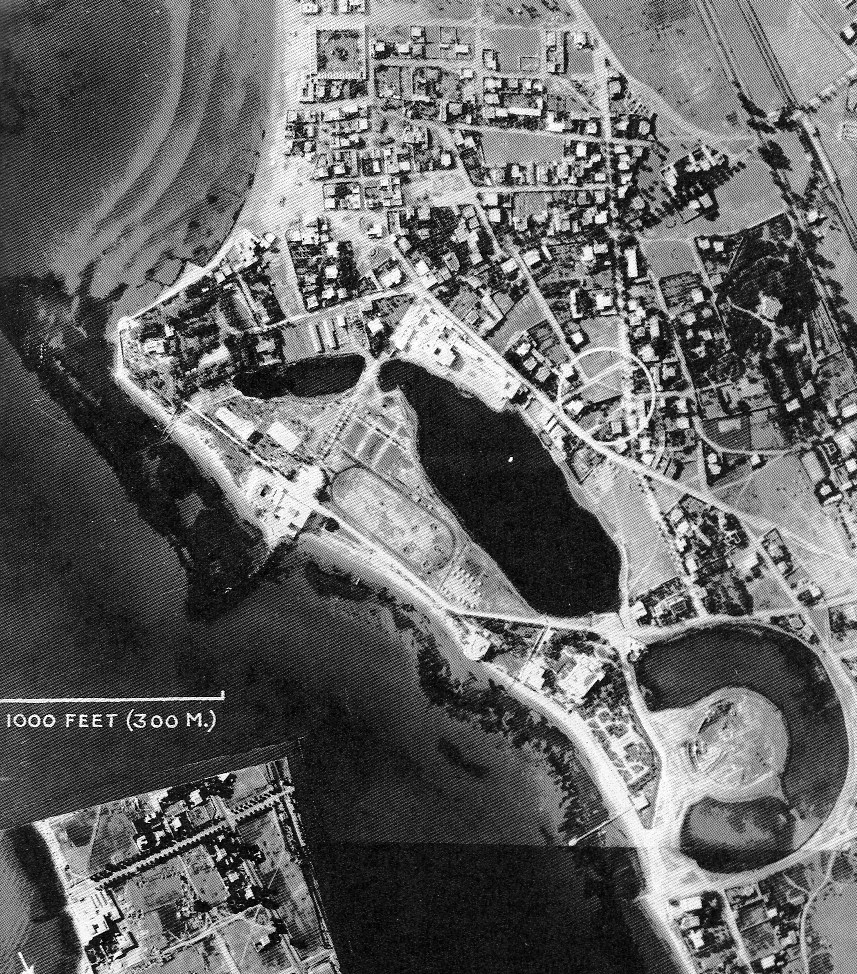
A World War II United States Army Air Forces aerial reconnaissance photograph of the remains of the naval base of the city of Carthage. The remains of the mercantile harbour are in the centre and those of the military harbour are bottom right. (North is to the bottom-right)

The renewed close siege cut off landward entry to the city, but a tight seaward interdiction was all but impossible with the naval technology of the time. Frustrated at the amount of food being shipped into the city, Scipio built an immense mole to cut off access to the harbour via blockade runners. The Carthaginians responded by cutting a new channel from their harbour to the sea. They had built a new fleet and once the channel was complete, the Carthaginians sailed out, taking the Romans by surprise. In the ensuing Battle of the Port of Carthage the Carthaginians held their own, but when withdrawing at the end of the day many of their ships were trapped against the city's sea wall and sunk or captured. The Romans now attempted to advance against the Carthaginian defences in the harbour area, eventually gaining control of the quay. Here, over several months, they constructed a brick structure as high as the city wall, which enabled up to 4,000 Romans to fire onto the Carthaginian ramparts from short range.

Once this feature was complete, Scipio detached a large force and led it against the Carthaginian field army at Nepheris. The Carthaginians, commanded by a Greek named Diogenes, had established a fortified camp for their winter quarters. Late in 147 BC Scipio directed an assault on the camp from several directions and overran it. Fleeing Carthaginians were pursued by Rome's mounted Numidian allies and few escaped. The town of Nepheris was then besieged and surrendered after three weeks. Most of the fortified positions still holding out in Carthage's hinterland now opened their gates.

=== 146 BC ===
Scipio's position as the Roman commander in Africa was extended for a year in 146 BC. In the spring he launched a full-scale assault from the harbour area, which successfully breached the walls. Over six days, the Romans systematically worked their way through the residential part of the city, killing everyone they encountered and setting the buildings behind them on fire. On the last day Scipio agreed to accept prisoners, except for 900 Roman deserters in Carthaginian service, who fought on from the Temple of Eshmoun and burnt it down around themselves when all hope was gone. At this point, Hasdrubal surrendered to Scipio on the promise of his life and freedom. Hasdrubal's wife, watching from a rampart, then blessed Scipio, cursed her husband and walked into the temple with her children to burn to death.

50,000 Carthaginian prisoners were sold into slavery. The notion that Roman forces then sowed the city with salt is likely a 19th-century invention. Many of the religious items and cult-statues which Carthage had pillaged from Sicilian cities and temples over the centuries were returned with great ceremony.

== Aftermath ==
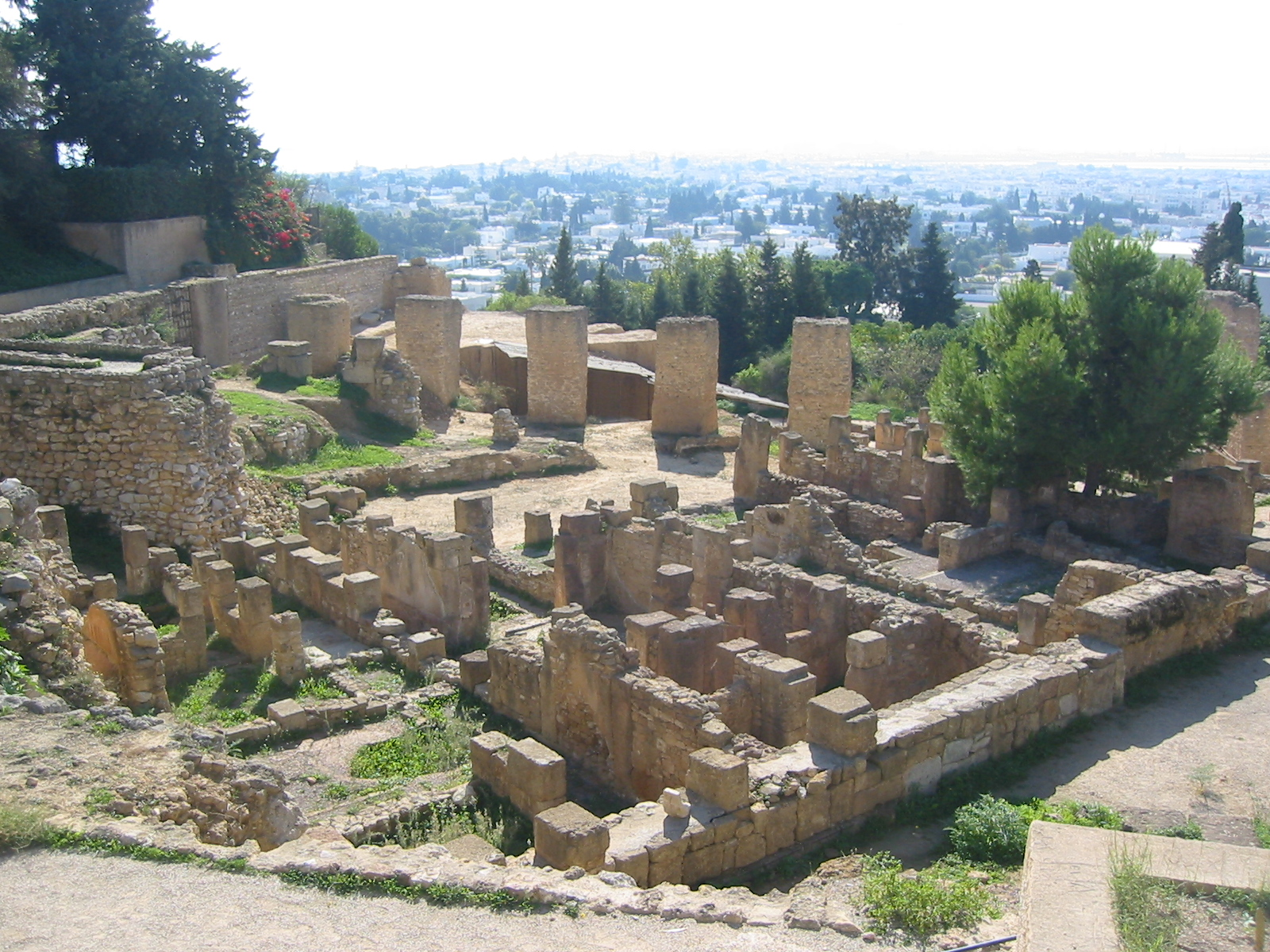
Ruins of the Punic Quarter, Carthage, in 2005

Rome was determined that the city of Carthage remain in ruins. The Senate despatched a ten-man commission and Scipio was ordered to carry out further demolitions. A curse was placed on anyone who might attempt to resettle the site in the future. The former site of the city was confiscated as ager publicus, public land. Scipio celebrated a triumph and took the agnomen "Africanus", as had his adoptive grandfather. Hasdrubal's fate is not known, although he had surrendered on the promise of a retirement to an Italian estate. The formerly Carthaginian territories were annexed by Rome and reconstituted to become the Roman province of Africa, with Utica as its capital. The province became a major source of grain and other food.

The Punic cities which had stood by Carthage to the end were forfeit to Rome as ager publicus, or, as in the case of Bizerte, were destroyed. Surviving cities were permitted to retain at least elements of their traditional system of government and culture. The Romans did not interfere in the locals' private lives and Punic culture, language and religion survived, and is known to modern scholars as "Neo-Punic civilization". The Punic language continued to be spoken in North Africa until the 7th century AD.

In 123 BC a reformist faction in Rome led by Gaius Gracchus was eager to redistribute land, including publicly held land. This included the site of Carthage and a controversial law was passed ordering the establishment of a new settlement there, called Junonia. Conservatives argued against the law and after its passage spread rumours that markers delimitating the new settlement had been dug up by wolves – a very poor omen. These rumours, and other political machinations, caused the plan to be scrapped. (Note: Gracchus, who had fought under Scipio during the war in Africa, continued to push his land reform agenda and in 121 BC was murdered, along with 3,000 of his partisans.) In 111 BC legislation repeated the injunction against any resettlement. A century after the war, Julius Caesar planned to rebuild Carthage as a Roman city, but little work was done. Augustus revived the concept in 29 BC and brought the plan to completion. Roman Carthage had become one of the main cities of Roman Africa by the time of the Empire.

Rome still exists as the capital of Italy; the ruins of Carthage lie 16 km (10 mi) east of modern Tunis on the North African coast; the modern town is a suburb of Tunis and the site of the Tunisian Presidential Palace. A symbolic peace treaty was signed by Ugo Vetere and Chedli Klibi, the mayors of Rome and modern Carthage, respectively, on 5 February 1985, 2,131 years after the war ended.

== Notes, citations and sources ==
=== Sources ===
- Astin, A. E. (1967). Scipio Aemilianus. Oxford: Clarendon Press. OCLC 250072988.
- Astin, A. E. (2006) [1989]. "Sources". In Astin, A. E.; Walbank, F. W.; Frederiksen, M. W. & Ogilvie, R. M. (eds.). Cambridge Ancient History: Rome and the Mediterranean to 133 B.C., Volume 8, 2nd Edition. Cambridge: Cambridge University Press. pp. 1–16. ISBN 978-0-521-23448-1.
- Bagnall, Nigel (1999). The Punic Wars: Rome, Carthage and the Struggle for the Mediterranean. London: Pimlico. ISBN 978-0-7126-6608-4.
- Beard, Mary (2016). SPQR: A History of Ancient Rome. London: Profile Books. ISBN 978-1-84668-381-7.
- Le Bohec, Yann (2015) [2011]. "The "Third Punic War": The Siege of Carthage (148–146 BC)". In Hoyos, Dexter (ed.). A Companion to the Punic Wars. Chichester, West Sussex: John Wiley. pp. 430–446. ISBN 978-1-1190-2550-4.
- Champion, Craige B. (2015) [2011]. "Polybius and the Punic Wars". In Hoyos, Dexter (ed.). A Companion to the Punic Wars. Chichester, West Sussex: John Wiley. pp. 95–110. ISBN 978-1-1190-2550-4.
- Fakhri, Habib (1985). "Rome and Carthage Sign Peace Treaty Ending Punic Wars After 2,131 Years". Associated Press. Archived from the original on 7 February 2019.
- Fantar, M’hamed-Hassine (2015) [2011]. "Death and Transfiguration: Punic Culture after 146". In Hoyos, Dexter (ed.). A Companion to the Punic Wars. Chichester, West Sussex: John Wiley. pp. 449–466. ISBN 978-1-1190-2550-4.
- Goldsworthy, Adrian (2006). The Fall of Carthage: The Punic Wars 265–146 BC. London: Phoenix. ISBN 978-0-304-36642-2.
- Harris, W. V. (2006) [1989]. "Roman Expansion in the West". In Astin, A. E.; Walbank, F. W.; Frederiksen, M. W. & Ogilvie, R. M. (eds.). Cambridge Ancient History: Rome and the Mediterranean to 133 B.C., Volume 8, 2nd Edition. Cambridge: Cambridge University Press. pp. 107–162. ISBN 978-0-521-23448-1.
- Holland, Tom (2004). Rubicon: The Triumph and Tragedy of the Roman Republic. London: Abacus. ISBN 0-349-11563-X.
- Hoyos, Dexter (2005). Hannibal's Dynasty: Power and Politics in the Western Mediterranean, 247–183 BC. New York: Routledge. ISBN 978-0-415-35958-0.
- Hoyos, Dexter (2015) [2011]. "Introduction: The Punic Wars". In Hoyos, Dexter (ed.). A Companion to the Punic Wars. Chichester, West Sussex: John Wiley. pp. 449–466. ISBN 978-1-1190-2550-4.
- Jenkins, G. K. & Lewis, R. B. (1963). Carthaginian Gold and Electrum Coins. London: Royal Numismatic Society. OCLC 1024975511.
- Jouhaud, Edmond Jules René (1968). Historie de l'Afrique du Nord (in French). Paris: Éditions des Deux Cogs dÓr. OCLC 2553949.
- Kunze, Claudia (2015) [2011]. "Carthage and Numidia, 201–149". In Hoyos, Dexter (ed.). A Companion to the Punic Wars. Chichester, West Sussex: John Wiley. pp. 395–411. ISBN 978-1-1190-2550-4.
- Lazenby, John (1996). The First Punic War: A Military History. Stanford, California: Stanford University Press. ISBN 978-0-8047-2673-3.
- Lazenby, John (1998). Hannibal's War: A Military History of the Second Punic War. Warminster: Aris & Phillips. ISBN 978-0-85668-080-9.
- Miles, Richard (2011). Carthage Must be Destroyed. London: Penguin. ISBN 978-0-14-101809-6.
- Mineo, Bernard (2015) [2011]. "Principal Literary Sources for the Punic Wars (apart from Polybius)". In Hoyos, Dexter (ed.). A Companion to the Punic Wars. Chichester, West Sussex: John Wiley. pp. 111–128. ISBN 978-1-1190-2550-4.
- Mitchell, Stephen (2007). A History of the Later Roman Empire. Oxford: Blackwell. ISBN 978-1-4051-0856-0.
- Pollard, Elizabeth (2015). Worlds Together Worlds Apart. New York: W.W. Norton. ISBN 978-0-393-91846-5.
- Purcell, Nicholas (1995). "On the Sacking of Carthage and Corinth". In Innes, Doreen; Hine, Harry; Pelling, Christopher (eds.). Ethics and Rhetoric: Classical Essays for Donald Russell on his Seventy Fifth Birthday. Oxford: Clarendon. pp. 133–148. ISBN 978-0-19-814962-0.
- Richardson, John (2015) [2011]. "Spain, Africa, and Rome after Carthage". In Hoyos, Dexter (ed.). A Companion to the Punic Wars. Chichester, West Sussex: John Wiley. pp. 467–482. ISBN 978-1-1190-2550-4.
- Ridley, Ronald (1986). "To Be Taken with a Pinch of Salt: The Destruction of Carthage". Classical Philology. 81 (2): 140–146. doi:10.1086/366973. JSTOR 269786. S2CID 161696751.
- Ripley, George; Dana, Charles A. (1858–1863). "Carthage". The New American Cyclopædia: a Popular Dictionary of General Knowledge. Vol. 4. New York: D. Appleton. p. 497. OCLC 1173144180.
- Scullard, Howard (1955). "Carthage". Greece & Rome. 2 (3): 98–107. doi:10.1017/S0017383500022166. JSTOR 641578. S2CID 248519024.
- Scullard, Howard H. (2002). A History of the Roman World, 753 to 146 BC. London: Routledge. ISBN 978-0-415-30504-4.
- Shutt, Rowland (1938). "Polybius: A Sketch". Greece & Rome. 8 (22): 50–57. doi:10.1017/S001738350000588X. JSTOR 642112. S2CID 162905667.
- Sidwell, Keith C.; Jones, Peter V. (1998). The World of Rome: An Introduction to Roman Culture. Cambridge: Cambridge University Press. ISBN 978-0-521-38600-5.
- "Archaeological Site of Carthage". UNESCO. 2020. Archived from the original on 23 June 2017.
- Vogel-Weidemann, Ursula (1989). "Carthago delenda est: Aitia and Prophasis". Acta Classica. 2 (32): 79–95. JSTOR 2459-1872.
- Walbank, F.W. (1979). A Historical Commentary on Polybius. Vol. III. Oxford: Clarendon. ISBN 978-0-19-814011-5.
- Walbank, F.W. (1990). Polybius. Vol. 1. Berkeley: University of California Press. ISBN 978-0-520-06981-7.
