= Battle of Oroscopa =

151 BC battle between Carthage and Numidia

- Part of the prelude of the Third Punic War
| Date | 151 BC |
| Location | Unknown location in northern Tunisia |
| Result | Numidian victory |

Belligerents
| Carthage; Numidian rebels | Numidia |

Commanders and leaders
| Hasdrubal (surrendered); Suba (executed); Asasis (executed) | Masinissa; Gulussa |

Strength
| 31,400 | Unknown |

Casualties and losses
| Unknown, but very heavy | Unknown, but light |

The Battle of Oroscopa was fought between a Carthaginian army of more than 30,000 men commanded by the general Hasdrubal and a Numidian force of unknown size under its king, Masinissa. It took place in late 151 BC near the ancient town of Oroscopa in what is now north western Tunisia. The battle resulted in a heavy Carthaginian defeat.

When the Second Punic War between Rome and Carthage ended in 201 BC, one of the terms of the peace treaty prohibited Carthage from waging war without the permission of the Roman Senate. Masinissa, an ally of Rome, exploited this to repeatedly raid and seize Carthaginian territory with impunity. In 151 BC, Carthage assembled an army of 25,400 men under Hasdrubal, disregarding the treaty. This force was joined by 6,000 Numidian cavalry led by two disgruntled Numidian leaders and attempted to deter Masinissa's aggression against the Carthaginian-held town of Oroscopa. Amid considerable fighting Masinissa lured the Carthaginians into an area of rough terrain with limited water sources, where foraging for food was difficult, and surrounded them. The Carthaginians considered their opponents to be unregimented tribesmen and expected them to disperse, but Masinissa had forged a well-disciplined army with an efficient logistics system and it was able to starve the Carthaginians into surrender.

In contravention of the terms of the surrender, the Carthaginians were then attacked and many, perhaps most, were killed. Hasdrubal and most of his officers survived and returned to Carthage. There, Hasdrubal was condemned to death in an attempt to placate Rome, but anti-Carthaginian factions in Rome used the illicit military action as a pretext to prepare a punitive expedition. This sparked the Third Punic War, which ended in the complete destruction of Carthage in 146 BC and the death or enslavement of its population.

== Background ==
In the mid-2nd century BC Rome was the dominant power in the Mediterranean region, and Carthage was a large city-state in the north east of what is now modern Tunisia. The Romans referred to the Carthaginians by the Latin word Punicus (or Poenicus), which is a reference to Carthage's Phoenician origin. "Punic" derives from this usage. Carthage and Rome had fought the 23-year-long First Punic War from 264 to 241 BC and the 17-year-long Second Punic War between 218 and 201 BC. Both wars ended with Roman victories, the Second when the Roman general Scipio Africanus defeated Hannibal, the premier Carthaginian general of the war, at the Battle of Zama, 160 kilometres (100 mi) south west of Carthage. Africanus imposed a peace treaty on the Carthaginians which stripped them of their overseas territories, and some of their African ones. An indemnity of 10,000 silver talents (Note: Several different "talents" are known from antiquity. The ones referred to in this article are all Euboic (or Euboeic) talents. At the time of the Second Punic War 10,000 talents was approximately 269,000 kg (265 long tons) of silver.) was to be paid over 50 years. Hostages were taken and Carthage was prohibited from waging war outside Africa, and in Africa only with the Roman Senate's express permission. Many senior Carthaginians wanted to reject the treaty, but Hannibal spoke strongly in its favour and it was accepted in spring 201 BC. Henceforth it was clear that Carthage was politically subordinate to Rome.

== Prelude ==
Map of approximate extent of Numidian, Carthaginian and Roman territory in 150 BC

At the end of the Second Punic War Masinissa, an ally of Rome, emerged as by far the most powerful ruler among the Numidians, the indigenous population which controlled much of what is now Algeria and Tunisia. Over the following 50 years he repeatedly took advantage of Carthage's inability to militarily protect its possessions by raiding or seizing territory which Carthage had long held. The Carthaginians repeatedly petitioned Rome for redress, claiming that Masinissa was in breach of the treaty. Rome always backed Masinissa and refused to act or to give permission for Carthage to take military action to defend its territory. Masinissa's seizures of Carthaginian land and settlements became increasingly flagrant, extending to major towns and important ports.

== Battle ==
In 151 BC the Numidians once again raided into territory which had been Carthaginian for centuries. They blockaded the town of Oroscopa (Note: The location of Oroscopa, other than that it was in what is now northern Tunisia, is not clear. Possibly it was near modern Vaga.) and devastated the farmland around it. This was a provocation too far for the Carthaginians; they raised an army of 25,000 infantry and 400 cavalry commanded by the previously unrecorded Carthaginian general Hasdrubal and, regardless of the treaty, counter-attacked the Numidians. They were reinforced by two disgruntled Numidian leaders, Suba and Asasis, with 6,000 additional cavalry.

The Carthaginians advanced on Oroscopa, won several small-scale skirmishes and, as Hasdrubal saw it, drove the Numidians away. Dissatisfied with this, Hasdrubal had the Carthaginian army follow the Numidians, hoping to provoke them into a decisive battle. The Numidians deliberately lured the Carthaginians on, into an area of rough going where water sources were limited and foraging for food was difficult. Eventually there was a set-piece battle; it is unclear whether Masinissa chose to give battle or was compelled to by Hasdrubal's manoeuvres. The fight went on for a whole day, but with no result. It is possible that the fighting largely consisted of cavalry charging and counter-charging while hurling javelins at each other, and that little hand-to-hand combat took place. The battle was supposedly watched by the adopted grandson of Africanus, Scipio Aemilianus, who was in Numidia to obtain war elephants for the Roman army from his adoptive grandfather's ally.

Hasdrubal withdrew his army to a hilltop, fortified his camp and entered into negotiations with Masinissa, using Aemilianus as an intermediary. As the Carthaginians were unwilling to hand over Suba and Asasis to Masinissa for punishment, the negotiations failed. Meanwhile, the Numidians had constructed their own fortifications in a wide circle around the base of the hill on which the Carthaginians were encamped. This prevented the Carthaginians from foraging for food, or even from moving off as an army without a hard fight. Hasdrubal was unwilling to commit his army to the latter, especially as he believed that the Numidian army was a loose barbarian confederation whose supply lines would be more stretched than his own. He was convinced that with neither combat nor loot they would soon start to return home. So the Carthaginians consumed the supplies of food they had with them, then slaughtered and ate their pack animals. With these gone they killed and ate their cavalry mounts. With no firewood to burn to make this diet more palatable, the Carthaginians burnt the wooden components of their shields and other equipment.

During his long reign Masinissa had created a well-disciplined army with more efficient logistics than when the Carthaginians had last fought him, 50 years before. This force surprised the Carthaginians with its ability to maintain itself in the field for a sustained period. Eventually disease struck the Carthaginian camp and Hasdrubal was forced to surrender. Humiliating terms were imposed, including the payment of a huge indemnity. While the Carthaginian soldiers were surrendering they were attacked by Numidian cavalry led by Masinissa's son, Gulussa. Whether this was with the connivance of Masinissa is unclear. The modern historian William Harris suggests that Gulussa was encouraged by the Romans in this attack. The casualties suffered by the Carthaginians are also unclear: Harris states that "very few returned home", Nigel Bagnall writes of "few survivors" and Adrian Goldsworthy that "many [were] cut down". All sources agree that Hasdrubal and most of his officers survived, and returned to Carthage. There Hasdrubal was condemned to death, in an attempt to placate Rome. The Numidians took over the Campi Magni (Great Plains) region and the town of Thusca (modern Sers) in what is now north western Tunisia. The fighting, surrender and massacre were probably over by late 151 BC.

== Aftermath ==
Carthage had paid off its indemnity to Rome, imposed fifty years before at the end of the Second Punic War, in 151 BC and was prospering economically, but was no military threat to Rome. Nevertheless, there had long been a faction within the Roman Senate that had wished to take military action against Carthage. Using the illicit Carthaginian military action as a pretext, Rome began preparing a punitive expedition. Carthaginian embassies attempted to negotiate with Rome, which responded evasively. The large North African port city of Utica, some 55 km (34 mi) north of Carthage, defected to Rome in 149 BC. Aware that Utica's harbour would greatly facilitate any assault on Carthage, the Senate and the People's Assembly of Rome declared war on Carthage.

A large Roman army landed at Utica. The Carthaginians hoped to appease the Romans, but despite the Carthaginians surrendering all of their weapons, the Romans pressed on to besiege the city of Carthage, starting the Third Punic War. The Roman campaign suffered repeated setbacks through 149 BC. A new Roman commander took over in 148 BC, and fared equally badly. At the annual election of Roman magistrates in early 147 BC Scipio Aemilianus was appointed consul and commander in Africa. Scipio tightened the siege and defeated a Carthaginian naval sortie. He then led a strong force that stormed the camp of Carthage's field army and forced most of the towns and cities still supporting Carthage to surrender. In the spring of 146 BC Scipio launched the Romans' final assault and over six days systematically destroyed the city and killed its inhabitants. Only on the last day were prisoners taken, 50,000 of them, who were sold into slavery. The former Carthaginian territories became the Roman province of Africa with Utica as its capital.

== Notes, citations and sources ==
=== Sources ===
- Bagnall, Nigel (1999). The Punic Wars: Rome, Carthage and the Struggle for the Mediterranean. London: Pimlico. ISBN 978-0-7126-6608-4.
- Goldsworthy, Adrian (2006). The Fall of Carthage: The Punic Wars 265–146 BC. London: Phoenix. ISBN 978-0-304-36642-2.
- Harris, W. V. (2006) [1989]. "Roman Expansion in the West". In Astin, A. E.; Walbank, F. W.; Frederiksen, M. W. & Ogilvie, R. M. (eds.). Cambridge Ancient History: Rome and the Mediterranean to 133 B.C. Vol. 8 (2nd ed.). Cambridge: Cambridge University Press. pp. 107–162. ISBN 978-0-521-23448-1.
- Holland, Tom (2004). Rubicon: The Triumph and Tragedy of the Roman Republic. London: Abacus. ISBN 978-0-349-11563-4.
- Kunze, Claudia (2015) [2011]. "Carthage and Numidia, 201–149". In Hoyos, Dexter (ed.). A Companion to the Punic Wars. Chichester, West Sussex: John Wiley. pp. 395–411. ISBN 978-1-1190-2550-4.
- Lazenby, John (1996). The First Punic War: A Military History. Stanford, California: Stanford University Press. ISBN 978-0-8047-2673-3.
- Lazenby, John (1998). Hannibal's War: A Military History of the Second Punic War. Warminster, Wiltshire: Aris & Phillips. ISBN 978-0-85668-080-9.
- Le Bohec, Yann (2015) [2011]. "The "Third Punic War": The Siege of Carthage (148–146 BC)". In Hoyos, Dexter (ed.). A Companion to the Punic Wars. Chichester, West Sussex: John Wiley. pp. 430–446. ISBN 978-1-1190-2550-4.
- Miles, Richard (2011). Carthage Must be Destroyed. London: Penguin. ISBN 978-0-14-101809-6.
- Scullard, Howard H. (2002). A History of the Roman World, 753 to 146 BC. London: Routledge. ISBN 978-0-415-30504-4.
- Sidwell, Keith C.; Jones, Peter V. (1998). The World of Rome: An Introduction to Roman Culture. Cambridge: Cambridge University Press. ISBN 978-0-521-38600-5.
- "Archaeological Site of Carthage". UNESCO. 2020.
