= Battle of Lake Tunis =

149 BC series of engagements in the Third Punic War

- Part of the Third Punic War
Date	July 27, 149 BC
Location	Lake of Tunis, Tunisia 36°49′N 10°15′E
Result	Carthaginian victory

Belligerents
Roman Republic	Carthage

Commanders and leaders
Lucius Marcius Censorinus; Manius Manilius; Scipio Aemilianus	Himilco Phameas

Strength
6,000+ troops 200+ ships	Unknown

Casualties and losses
800 killed 135 ships	Unknown (light)

The Battle of Lake Tunis was a series of engagements of the Third Punic War fought in 149 BC between the Carthaginians and the Roman Republic. Roman consuls Manius Manilius and Lucius Marcius Censorinus, leading separate forces, made several unsuccessful attempts to breach the walls of Carthage. Later, the Carthaginians launched fire ships, which destroyed most of the Roman fleet. Eventually Censorinus returned to Rome, leaving Manilius to continue fighting.

== Initial assault ==
When the Roman consuls Manius Manilius and Lucius Marcius Censorinus made their beachhead at Carthage, they deployed separately in two locations; Manilius set up his camp on the isthmus leading up to the city, directly facing the citadel of Byrsa, while Censorinus made his encampment on the shore of Lake Tunis, opposite the western wall of Carthage. Manilius planned to fill the ditch facing the southern wall and from there scale it, while Censorinus intended to raise ladders to the western wall from the ground and the decks of the ships. Two initial assaults were made. The consuls thought the Carthaginians were without arms, but they were surprised to find the citizens re-armed, and both attempts were repelled. Fearing the approach of Hasdrubal the Boetharch, who was encamped on the other side of Lake Tunis, each consul fortified his camp. (Note: Appian, Punica 97)

== Surprise attack on Censorinus's camp ==
After fortifying his camp, Censorinus dispatched his men to gather timber from the far side of Lake Tunis, intending to build new siege engines. Himilco Phameas, the Carthaginian cavalry commander, seized this opportunity to attack the gatherers, resulting in a loss of 500 Roman soldiers and a great deal of tools for constructing siege works. Nevertheless, Censorinus acquired sufficient timber to build siege engines and ladders, and he and Manilius launched another attack on the city in concert, which was again repulsed. (Note: Appian, Punica 97) Manilius decided against launching another assault on the walls from the isthmus, but Censorinus, having filled up parts of the lake to provide room, constructed two battering rams, one for his fleet and another supported by 6000 infantry. In the subsequent assault on the walls from Lake Tunis, his troops managed to breach Carthage's wall before being driven off by the defenders, who hastily began repairing the breach. Fearing a second assault, the Carthaginians sallied from the unrepaired wall that evening and assaulted the camp on Lake Tunis, burning many of the Roman siege engines. (Note: Appian, Punica 98)

The next day, the Roman troops attempted to break through the gap in the wall, though Scipio Aemilianus, then serving as military tribune under Censorinus, refused to enter and held his troops in reserve, instead spacing them at regular intervals along the wall. While Aemilianus's troops avoided battle, the other troops were met by staunch resistance in the gap, suffering heavy casualties. (Note: Appian, Punica 98)

== Roman withdrawal and fire attack ==
Around 27 July - at the appearance of Sirius on the horizon at sunrise - Censorinus faced an epidemic in his ranks, having kept his troops on stagnant water with poor airflow from the sea over Carthage's walls. Accordingly, he relocated his camp to a site on the shore of the sea. The Carthaginians, noting the movement of the Roman fleet, constructed fire ships in their harbour and launched them along the coastline when the Roman fleet came into view. The resulting fire attack destroyed most of the Roman fleet, and substantially set back the Roman assault. Shortly afterwards, Censorinus returned to Rome to conduct elections, and the attacks on Manilius increased in intensity. (Note: Appian, Punica 99)

== See also ==
- Punic Wars
- Siege of Carthage (Third Punic War)
