= Lucius Marcius Censorinus (consul 149 BC) =

Roman politician, senator and consul in 149 BC

Lucius Marcius Censorinus was a Roman politician and military leader of the Middle Republic, serving as consul with Manius Manilius in 149 BC and censor in 147 BC. He led the fleet during the first phase of the Third Punic War.

== Name ==
Lucius was the most common of the praenomina used by the gens Marcia, although both his father and grandfather had been named Gaius. Inscriptions and records listing his filiation thus described him as Lucius Marcius f. C. n. C. He belonged to the Marcii Censorini branch of the family, whose surname (cognomen) Censorinus was used by the descendants of Gaius Marcius Rutilus, who had served as the first plebeian censor.

== Life ==
The Western Mediterranean litoral c. 150 BC, showing the territory of Rome (red), Numidia (purple), and Carthage (gray).

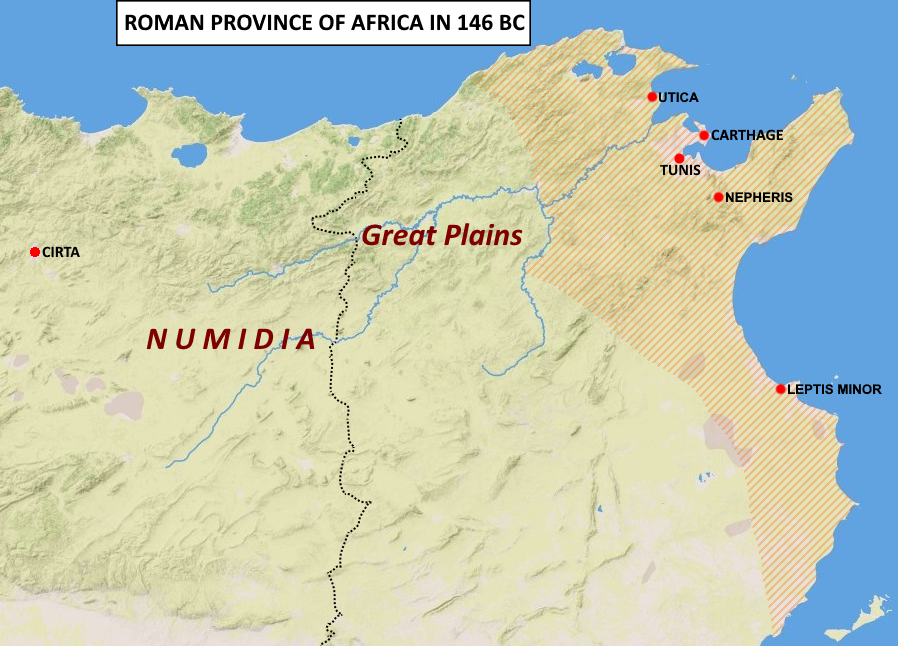
The Roman province of Africa c. 146 BC, showing the relative positions of Carthage, Utica, and modern Tunis in the Gulf of Tunis.

L. Marcius Censorinus was born to the prominent plebeian family of the Marcia in the 2nd century BC. Following the cursus honorum, he was elected curule aedile in 160 BC, praetor in 152 BC, and then consul for 149 BC with Manius Manilius.

As consul, his primary responsibility was the onset of the Third Punic War. The precise reasons for the war continue to be debated, but the Romans had been displeased by the end of Carthage's reparations payments in 151 BC, its general economic prosperity and attendant commercial competition, and the large and technically illegal army raised under Hasdrubal the Boeotarch the same year to respond to the constant raiding by Masinissa's Numidian Kingdom. With most of that force massacred by the Numidians after the disastrous Battle of Oroscopa and the vital nearby port city of Utica allying with Rome in 149 BC, the Romans quickly declared war. Censorinus commanded the fleet and Manilius the army. Landing at Utica, they were met by a Carthaginian embassy that agreed to hand over all weaponry, including all of their warships, thousands of catapults, and hundreds of thousands of sets of armor. The supplies were shipped by sea and the warships were burnt in Utica's harbor. All of this done, Censorinus then further demanded that the Carthaginians entirely abandon their city, relocating at least 16 km (10 mi) away from the sea and allowing the Romans to destroy the current fortifications. The Carthaginians finally abandoned negotiation and prepared to defend themselves. The initial two-pronged assault of the Siege of Carthage did not go well and was repulsed by forces under the generals Hasdrubal the Boeotarch and Himilco Phameas, as well as illness across the unhealthful Roman emcampments. When Censorinus was finally forced to relocate, his less defensible new location allowed the fleet to be damaged by Carthaginian fireships until further fortifications could be constructed. Discipline among the Roman forces was generally low, outside of the men directly under Scipio Aemilianus.

Censorinus was finally obliged to return to Rome before the end of the siege to oversee the next year's elections. He was then elected censor in 147 BC.

== See also ==
- Third Punic War

Preceded by Titus Quinctius Flamininus and Manius Acilius Balbus	Consul of the Roman Republic with Manius Manilius; 149 BC	Succeeded by Spurius Postumius Albinus Magnus and Lucius Calpurnius Piso Caesoninus
