= Battle of Nepheris (147 BC) =

Battle in 147 BC

Coordinates: 36°36′54.382″N 10°22′59.045″E

- Part of the Third Punic War
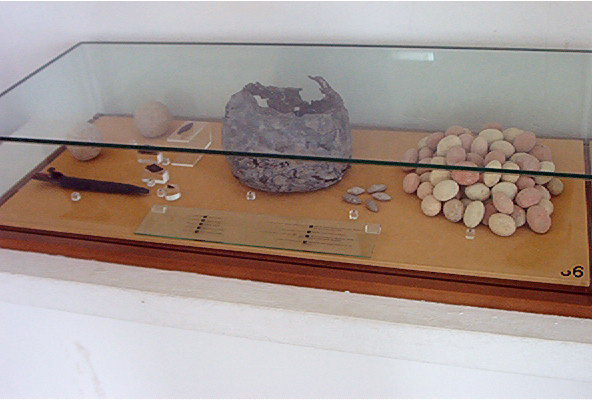
- Artifacts from the siege of Carthage 149–146 BC
Date	147 BC
Location	Nepheris, south of Carthage
Result	Roman victory

Belligerents
Roman Republic	Carthage

Commanders and leaders
Scipio Aemilianus	Diogenes of Carthage

Strength
Unknown	7,000–10,000

Casualties and losses
Unknown	7,000 dead 5,000 prisoners (including non-combatants)

The Battle of Nepheris was the second battle of the Third Punic War that took place at Nepheris in late 147 BC. The battle was fought between the forces of the Roman Republic, commanded by Scipio Aemilianus, and the forces of Carthage who were commanded by Diogenes of Carthage.

After the Roman defeat at the Battle of the Port of Carthage, Scipio Aemilianus decided to destroy the Carthaginian army at Nepheris, a stronghold south of the capital where the previous year the Romans had suffered a defeat at the First Battle of Nepheris against Hasdrubal the Boetharch.

In 147 BC, the Romans blockaded Carthage and effectively cut off all supplies being sent to the defenders at Nepheris whose defense was being conducted by Diogenes of Carthage. Scipio surrounded the Carthaginian camp, forcing them to come out and give battle against the smaller Roman army. Surrounded on all sides, the Carthaginians were soundly defeated, losing thousands of soldiers during the course of the battle. The majority of the remainder of the Carthaginian force was taken prisoner; only 4,000 managed to slip away. The capture of Nepheris marked the turning point in the morale of the defenders of Carthage, which would fall a few months later.

== See also ==
- Punic Wars
