= Spurius Postumius Albinus Magnus =

Roman senator and orator

Spurius Postumius Albinus Magnus was a politician of ancient Rome, of patrician rank, during the 2nd century BC. He was consul in 148 BC, in which year a great fire happened at Rome. It is this Spurius Albinus of whom Cicero speaks in the Brutus, and says that there were many orations of his.

== Children ==
Based on their filiations, he was probably the father of the consuls Spurius Postumius Albinus and Aulus Postumius Albinus.

== See also ==
- Postumia gens

Political offices
Preceded by L. Marcius Censorinus; Manius Manilius	Roman consul 148 BC with Lucius Calpurnius Piso Caesoninus	Succeeded by Scipio Aemilianus; Gaius Livius Drusus
