= Lucius Hostilius Mancinus (consul 145 BC) =

Lucius Hostilius Mancinus was a Roman magistrate, general, and consul of Rome during 145 BC. He is claimed to be the ancestor of the Mancini family, one of the oldest families of Roman nobility.

He was probably the son of Aulus Hostilius Mancinus, the consul in 170 BC together with Aulus Atilius Serranus. He served as the Legatus of the consul Lucius Calpurnius Piso in 148 BC where he commanded the Roman fleet against Carthage in the Third Punic War whilst Piso commanded the land troops. During this war, he commanded the fleet at the Battle of the Port of Carthage and had the privilege of being one of the first to enter the conquered city after it was taken by Publius Cornelius Scipio Aemilianus Africanus Numantinus in 146 BC.

After his return to Rome, he commissioned many art works depicting the war against Carthage and frequently recounted his war stories to the public. As a result, he became very popular with the Roman people and was elected as consul in 145 BC together with Quintus Fabius Maximus Aemilianus.

== See also ==
- Third Punic War
- Battle of the Port of Carthage
- List of Roman consuls

Political offices
Preceded by Gnaeus Cornelius Lentulus and Lucius Mummius Achaicus	Consul of the Roman Republic with Quintus Fabius Maximus Aemilianus; 145 BC	Succeeded by Servius Sulpicius Galba and Lucius Aurelius Cotta
