= Battle of the Port of Carthage =

147 BC victory for the Carthaginian navy

Battle of Port of Carthage
- Part of the Third Punic War
Date	147 BC
Location	Gulf of Tunis, Tunisia
Result	Carthaginian victory

Belligerents
Roman Republic	Carthage

Commanders and leaders
Scipio Aemilianus; Lucius Hostilius Mancinus	Hasdrubal the Boetharch

Strength
Unknown	50 ships

The Battle of the Port of Carthage was a naval battle of the Third Punic War fought in 147 BC between the Carthaginians and the Roman Republic.

In the summer of 147 BC, during the Siege of Carthage, the Roman fleet, under the command of Lucius Hostilius Mancinus kept a close watch on the city from the sea. His warships were reinforced that same year by the forces of Scipio Aemilianus. The Carthaginians managed to find an escape route to the sea that had not been effectively blockaded by the Roman navy and put their fleet of 50 triremes and smaller numbers of other vessels to sea to confront the invading fleet. They engaged the Roman fleet outside the Port of Carthage, and met with initial success in repulsing the Roman attacks to their ships, inflicting heavy casualties on them. As the battle progressed, the Carthaginians decided to return to port. During this operation, the smaller ships of the Carthaginian fleet blockaded the entrance to the port, forcing the Roman vessels very close into shallower waters.

Some of the smaller Carthaginian vessels were sunk, but at dawn, a majority had made it successfully back to port. This victory for the Carthaginian navy was not enough to break the blockade by the Roman navy.

== See also ==
- Punic Wars
