= Manius Manilius =

2nd-century BC Roman statesman

Manius Manilius (fl. 155 – 149 BC) was a Roman Republican orator and distinguished jurist who also had a long military career. It is unclear if he was related to the Manius Manilius who was degraded by Cato the Censor for embracing his wife in broad daylight in Cato's censorship from 184 BC to 182 BC.

Manilius was proconsul of Hispania Ulterior in 155 BC when the Lusitani, under the leadership of Punicus, raided that province, beginning the Lusitanian War; he led an army against them but was defeated. He became consul in 149 BC with Lucius Marcius Censorinus. He unsuccessfully besieged Carthage at the beginning of the Third Punic War, and was replaced by Calpurnius Piso in 149 after suffering a heavy defeat at Nepheris, a Carthaginian stronghold south of the city.

In Cicero's De oratore, Manilius was depicted as a member of the Scipionic Circle. In the work, Cicero describes Manilius as a "representative of the broad education required of the orator, and of old-fashioned generosity in helping others with his legal knowledge". Manilius is also a leading character in Cicero's De Re Publica, though it appears large portions of his dialogue occurred in parts of that work which are now lost.

== Manilius as a jurist ==
It was apparently the same ex-consul Manius Manilius (or possibly the elder man living some thirty years earlier) who was the author of a collection of formulae for contracts of sale. His works were still read in the classical period, and he was cited by such authors as Varro, Cicero, and Brutus.

== Notes ==
Political offices
Preceded by T. Quinctius Flamininus; Manius Acilius Balbus	Consul of the Roman Republic; 149 BC; With: Lucius Marcius Censorinus	Succeeded by Sp. Postumius Albinus Magnus; L. Calpurnius Piso Caesoninus
