= William V. Harris =

British-born historian (b. 1938)

William Vernon Harris FBA (born 13 September 1938) is a British-American classicist who was William R. Shepherd Professor of History at Columbia University until December 2017, when he resigned as part of the settlement of a sexual harassment suit. He is the author of numerous groundbreaking monographs on the Greco-Roman world, is a Fellow of the American Academy of Arts & Sciences, and was awarded the Distinguished Achievement Award by the Andrew W. Mellon Foundation in 2008.

== Life and career ==
William V. Harris was born on 13 September 1938 in Nottingham, England. He attended Bristol Grammar School (1949–1956) and then was an Open Scholar in Classics at Corpus Christi College, Oxford. He earned first class in Classical Moderations in 1959, then first class in Literae Humaniores in 1961. From 1961 he pursued graduate studies as a State Student at Oxford, spending the year 1961–1962 in Rome (where he worked with J.B. Ward-Perkins), and was then the T.W. Greene Scholar in Classical Art and Archaeology. His dissertation supervisor was M. W. Frederiksen, and he received his D.Phil. in 1968.

From 1964 to 1965 Harris served as Lecturer in Ancient History at Queen's University, Belfast. In 1965, he joined the faculty of Columbia University where he chaired the History Department from 1988 to 1994. In 1995 he was awarded the William R. Shepherd Professorship in History at Columbia. Beginning in 2000, he was director of Columbia's Center for the Ancient Mediterranean, which he co-founded. In 2002 he became a Fellow of the American Academy of Arts & Sciences, and in 2008 he was awarded the Distinguished Achievement Award by the Andrew W. Mellon Foundation. In 2011 he was elected a Corresponding Fellow of the British Academy.

Harris's work first attracted wide attention with his 1979 book War and Imperialism in Republican Rome, 327-70 BC, which contradicted several received doctrines about the nature of Roman imperial expansion across the Mediterranean world. One reviewer wrote: "In the process of evolving his interpretation, he treads on the toes of a majority of the living scholars (and a large number of deceased ones) who have interested themselves in this problem." The book has remained continuously in print. He then turned towards social history and published in 1989 what is probably his most controversial book, Ancient Literacy, in which he maintains that while the Greeks and Romans created deeply literate cultures, the mass of the Greek or Roman population remained illiterate. In the same period Harris began to work extensively on economic history, publishing a series of papers about slavery, money and other issues that were collected in Rome's Imperial Economy (2011). During his two three-year terms, covering 1988 to 1994, as the elected chair of the Columbia University History Department–he was acting chair again in 2005–the department moved to correct its gender imbalance. In the 1990s he began to work intensively on psychological aspects of ancient history, and in 2001 he published Restraining Rage: the Ideology of Anger Control in Classical Antiquity. Columbia College's undergraduates awarded this book its Lionel Trilling Award.

== Sexual harassment complaint ==
In October 2017, a Columbia University doctoral student, identified as Jane Doe, filed suit in the U.S. District Court for Southern New York against Harris and the trustees of Columbia University, alleging that Harris had repeatedly sexually harassed her throughout the years 2014 and 2015. The complaint also alleges that when the student rejected Harris's advances, he disparaged her to colleagues and fellow graduate students and that, as a result, the student withdrew from Columbia for the 2015–2016 academic year. The student claimed that university administration was aware that Harris had a history of harassment towards female students but had taken no steps address the situation. The complaint was brought under Title IX and the New York City Human Rights Law. On 30 October the university notified History Department faculty and graduate students via email that Harris "agreed with the university to withdraw from his teaching, advising and other student-related activities". It called the allegations in the lawsuit "a subject of considerable discussion and concern". A representative for the university said Harris remained an employee.

Two women, Wayne State University associate professor Jennifer Sheridan Moss and Duke University professor Jennifer Knust, came forward in December 2017 to report similar incidents with Harris in the 1980s when they were graduate students at Columbia. They and four unidentified women have indicated they are willing to testify in the lawsuit. Moss said she has successfully sought help in preventing Harris from retaliating against her from Roger S. Bagnall, then a Columbia professor and now professor emeritus at New York University. According to the New York Times, Bagnall said he "was aware of Dr. Harris's reputation for pursuing and harassing young women". He said: "even in the mid-80s, that just wasn't acceptable".

After Harris had stepped down from his teaching and student-related duties in October 2017, he retired voluntarily on 18 December as part of the settlement in the lawsuit filed in October. Columbia University stated that he would not be granted emeritus status or involved in any University activities. Harris has retained his status as a fellow of the American Academy of Arts and Sciences and the British Academy.

== Publications ==
=== Monographs ===
- 1971: Rome in Etruria and Umbria (Oxford: Clarendon Press), pp. x + 370
- 1979: War and Imperialism in Republican Rome, 327–70 B.C. (Oxford: Clarendon Press), pp. xii + 293 (corrected reprint, 1985; Spanish translation: Guerra e imperialismo en la Roma republicana, 327-70 a.C. Madrid: Siglo XXI)
- 1989: Ancient Literacy (Cambridge, Massachusetts: Harvard U.P.), pp. xvi + 383 (1991: Italian translation: Lettura e istruzione nel mondo antico, Rome and Bari: Laterza)
- 2002: Restraining Rage: the Ideology of Anger Control in Classical Antiquity (Cambridge, Massachusetts: Harvard U.P.), awarded the 2002 James Henry Breasted Prize of the American Historical Association
- 2009: Dreams and Experience in Classical Antiquity (Harvard University Press)
- 2011: Rome's Imperial Economy: Twelve Essays (Oxford University Press)
- 2016: Roman Power: a Thousand Years of Empire (Cambridge University Press)
- 2024: Dire Remedies: A Social History of Healthcare in Classical Antiquity (Berlin: De Gruyter)

=== Edited volumes ===
- 1984: The Imperialism of Mid Republican Rome (Papers and Monographs of the American Academy in Rome, vol. xxix, Rome)
- 1986: (with Roger S. Bagnall) Studies in Roman Law in Memory of A. Arthur Schiller (Columbia Studies in the Classical Tradition, vol. 13, Leiden)
- 1993: The Inscribed Economy: Production and Distribution in the Roman Empire in the light of instrumentum domesticum (Supplementary vol.6 of the Journal of Roman Archaeology, Ann Arbor)
- 1999: The Transformations of Urbs Roma in Late Antiquity (Supplementary vol. 33 of the Journal of Roman Archaeology)
- 2004: (with Giovanni Ruffini) Ancient Alexandria between Egypt and Greece (Columbia Studies in the Classical Tradition, vol. 26, Leiden: E.J. Brill)
- 2005: Rethinking the Mediterranean (Oxford: Clarendon Press)
- 2005: (with Elio Lo Cascio) Noctes Campanae: studi di storia ed archeologia dell’Italia preromana e romana in memoria di Martin Frederiksen (Naples: Luciano)
- 2005: The Spread of Christianity in the First Four Centuries: Essays in Explanation (Columbia Studies in the Classical Tradition, vol. 27, Leiden: E. J. Brill)
- 2008: Monetary Systems of the Greeks and Romans (Oxford: Oxford University Press)
- 2008: (with Brooke Holmes) Aelius Aristides between Greece, Rome and the Gods
- 2011: (with Kristine Iara) Maritime Technology in the Ancient Economy (Portsmouth, RI)
- 2013: Mental Disorders in the Classical World (Columbia Studies in the Classical Tradition, vol. 38, Leiden: E. J. Brill)
- 2013: The Ancient Mediterranean Environment between Science and History (Columbia Studies in the Classical Tradition, vol.39, Leiden: E. J. Brill)
- 2013: Moses Finley and Politics (Columbia Studies in the Classical Tradition, vol. 40, Leiden: E. J. Brill)
- 2016: Popular Medicine in Graeco-Roman Antiquity: Explorations (Columbia Studies in the Classical Tradition, vol. 42, Leiden: E. J. Brill)
