= Titus Quinctius Flamininus (consul 150 BC) =

2nd century BC Roman politician

Titus Quinctius Flamininus was a Roman politician in the second century BC.

== Family ==
He was a member of gens Quinctia. He was the son either of Titus Quinctius Flamininus, consul in 198 BC, or of his younger brother Lucius Quinctius Flamininus, who held the consulship in 192 BC. His son Titus Quinctius Flamininus was elected consul in 123 BC.

== Career ==
In 167 BC, he became an augur. In the same year, Flamininus was sent as an ambassador to Cotys IV, King of Thrace, to return the king's son, a Roman hostage, to the allied kingdom. In 153 BC, he served as praetor. In 150 BC, he was elected consul together with Manius Acilius Balbus as his colleague. Shortly after the consulship, Flamininus died.
