= Peter Jones (classicist) =

British classical scholar (born 1942)

Peter Vaughan Jones MBE (born 1942) is a Cambridge graduate with a doctorate on Homer. He is a former senior lecturer in Classics at the University of Newcastle upon Tyne, and co-founded with Jeannie Cohen the Friends of Classics charity. He used to be a teacher but is now employed as a writer, journalist and broadcaster. He is the brother of the late David E. H. Jones.

Spokesman for the national Co-ordinating Committee for Classics, Jones penned the series QED and Eureka for the Daily Telegraph. These pieces were subsequently published as Learn Latin and Learn Ancient Greek by Duckworth, which has also accounted for his Classics in Translation (again from the Daily Telegraph) and Ancient and Modern (from his weekly column in The Spectator). Jones has collaborated for Cambridge on Reading Greek and Reading Latin.

He has published a book called "Vote For Caesar" (2008) about how ancient civilisations have solved the problems of today. Awarded the MBE in 1983, Jones has written widely on Homer.

== Selected works ==
=== Books ===
- Jones, Peter (1997). Learn Latin. London: Duckworth & Co.
- Jones, Peter (1998). Learn Ancient Greek. London: Duckworth & Co.
- Jones, Peter (2013). Veni, Vidi, Vici: Everything You Ever Wanted to Know about the Romans But Were Afraid to Ask. Atlantic Books.
- Jones, Peter (2015). Eureka. Atlantic Books.
- Jones, Peter (2016). Quid Pro Quo: What the Romans Really Gave the English Language. Atlantic Books.
- Jones, Peter (2018). Memento Mori: What the Romans Can Tell Us About Old Age and Death. Atlantic Books.
- Jones, Peter (2019). Vox Populi: Everything You Ever Wanted to Know about the Classical World But Were Afraid to Ask. Atlantic Books.
- Jones, Peter (2008). Vote for Caesar : how the Ancient Greeks and Romans solved the problems of today. London: Orion.

=== Ancient and Modern columns in The Spectator ===
- Jones, Peter (4 January 2014). "Why does the year start in January?". Ancient and Modern. The Spectator. 324 (9671): 12.

== See also ==
- The Teaching of Classics ed. James Morwood, Foreword by Peter Jones (Cambridge University Press, 2003) ISBN 9780521527637
- English translations of Homer: Peter Jones
