= Lucius Calpurnius Piso Caesoninus (consul 148 BC) =

2nd-century BC Roman statesman

Lucius Calpurnius Piso Caesoninus was a Roman statesman in the 2nd century BC. He was elected consul in the year 148 BC, serving alongside Spurius Postumius Albinus Magnus. His last name indicates that he was originally a member of the Caesonia gens and was adopted by one of the Pisones.

Lucius served as Praetor in 154 BC, receiving the province Hispania Ulterior during the period of the Lusitanian War. He was defeated in battle against the Lusitani led by Punicus. He was consul during the second year of the Third Punic War, which he conducted so lackadaisically that he was replaced by Scipio the following year.

Political offices
Preceded by Lucius Marcius Censorinus; Manius Manilius	Consul of the Roman Republic; 148 BC with Spurius Postumius Albinus Magnus	Succeeded by Scipio Aemilianus; Gaius Livius Drusus
