= Howard Hayes Scullard =

British historian (1903–1983)

Howard Hayes Scullard FBA FSA (9 February 1903 – 31 March 1983) was a British historian specialising in ancient history, notable for editing the Oxford Classical Dictionary and for his many published works.

== Life and career ==
Scullard's father was Herbert Hayes Scullard, a minister, and his mother Barbara Louisa Dodds.

Born in Bedford, England, his early education was at Highgate School, followed by St John's College, Cambridge. He was a tutor and then reader at New College London, from 1935 to 1959, when he became Professor of Ancient History at King's College London, retiring in 1970. He nonetheless remained active in retirement and notably wrote chapters for the re-edition of The Cambridge Ancient History, but his contributions to volumes VII and VIII were published posthumously.

Perhaps his most widely known work is From the Gracchi to Nero: A History of Rome from 133 B.C. to A.D. 68, a text widely used by students studying Rome in the late republic, as well as Rome under the Julio-Claudians.

== Books ==
Author:

- Scipio Africanus in the Second Punic War, Cambridge: Cambridge University Press, 1930, a Thirlwall Prize essay.
- A History of the Roman World from 753 to 146 BC, London: Methuen, 1935, reprinted.
- Roman Politics 220-150 B.C., Oxford: Clarendon Press, 1951.
- From the Gracchi to Nero: A History of Rome from 133 B.C. to A.D. 68, London: Methuen, 1959, reprinted.
- Shorter Atlas of the Classical World, Edinburgh: Thomas Nelson & Sons, 1962.
- The Etruscan Cities and Rome, London: Thames & Hudson, 1967.
- Scipio Africanus: Soldier and Politician, London: Thames & Hudson, 1970.
- The Elephant in the Greek and Roman World, London: Thames & Hudson, 1974.
- Roman Britain: Outpost of the Empire, London: Thames & Hudson, 1979.
- Festivals and Ceremonies of the Roman Republic, London: Thames & Hudson, 1981.

Editor:

- Livy, History of Rome, vol. Book XXX, London: Metheun, 1939, with H.E. Butler
- Atlas of the Classical World, London: Nelson, 1959.
- The Grandeur That Was Rome, London: Sidgwick & Jackson, 1961.
- Oxford Classical Dictionary, Oxford: Clarendon Press, 1970, with N.G.L. Hammond.
- Cary, Max (18 June 1975), A History of Rome Down to the Reign of Constantine (3rd ed.), London: Macmillan, ISBN 9781349024155, 1975, the 1st edition having come out in 1935.
