= Richard Miles (historian) =

British historian and archaeologist (born 1969)

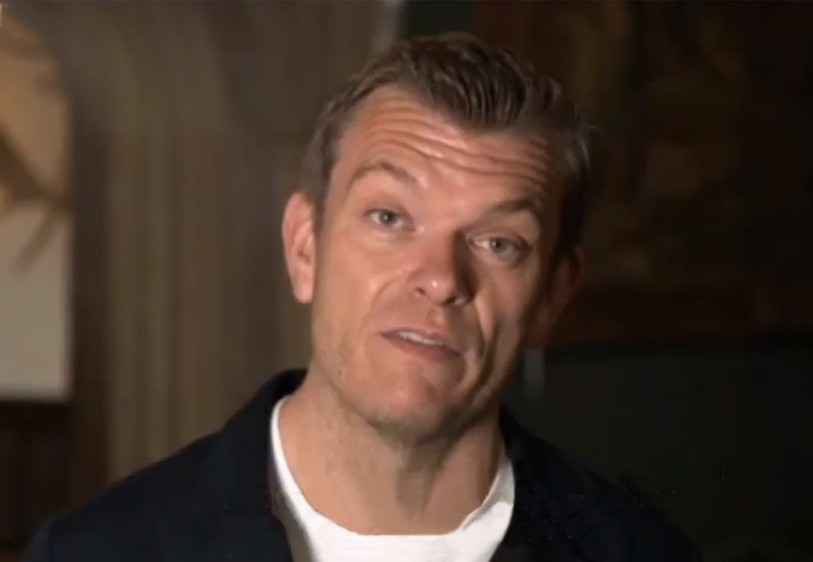
- Richard Miles in 2012
- Born: 2 January 1969 (age 57); Pembury, Kent, England
- Education: University of Liverpool (BA); Trinity Hall, Cambridge (PhD)
- Scientific career
- Fields: Archaeology, ancient history, classics
- Workplaces: University of Cambridge; University of Sydney; Queen's University Belfast
- Doctoral advisor: Peter Garnsey

Richard Miles (born 1969) is a British historian and archaeologist, best known for presenting two major historical documentary series: BBC2's Ancient Worlds (2010), which presented a comprehensive overview of classical history and the dawn of civilisation, and BBC Four's Archaeology: A Secret History (2013).

== Biography ==
Miles was born in Pembury, Kent. He studied ancient history and archaeology at the University of Liverpool and undertook a PhD in classics under Professor Peter Garnsey at Trinity Hall, Cambridge. He is Professor of Roman History and Archaeology and pro-vice-chancellor of enterprise and engagement at the University of Sydney. He was formerly head of the School of Philosophical and Historical Inquiry, and is a former director of the Arts Career Ready Programme at Sydney. His research primarily concerns Punic and Late Roman history and archaeology.

He has directed archaeological digs in Carthage and Rome, and in 2010 he published Carthage Must Be Destroyed: The Rise and Fall of an Ancient Mediterranean Civilisation. He also hosted the two-part Channel 4 series Carthage: The Roman Holocaust (2004), which focuses upon the war between Carthage and Rome.

== Works ==
- (editor) Constructing Identities in Late Antiquity (Routledge, 1999) ISBN 978-0-415-19406-8
- Carthage Must Be Destroyed (Allen Lane, 2010) ISBN 978-0-7139-9793-4; Paperback (Penguin, 2011) ISBN 978-0-14-101809-6
- The Vandals (Wiley-Blackwell, 2010). ISBN 978-1-4051-6068-1
- Ancient Worlds: The Search for the Origins of Western Civilization (Allen Lane, 2010) ISBN 978-0-7139-9794-1
- (editor) The Donatist Schism: Controversy and Contexts (Liverpool University Press, 2016) ISBN 978-1-78138-281-3
