= Yann Le Bohec =

French historian and epigrapher (born 1943)

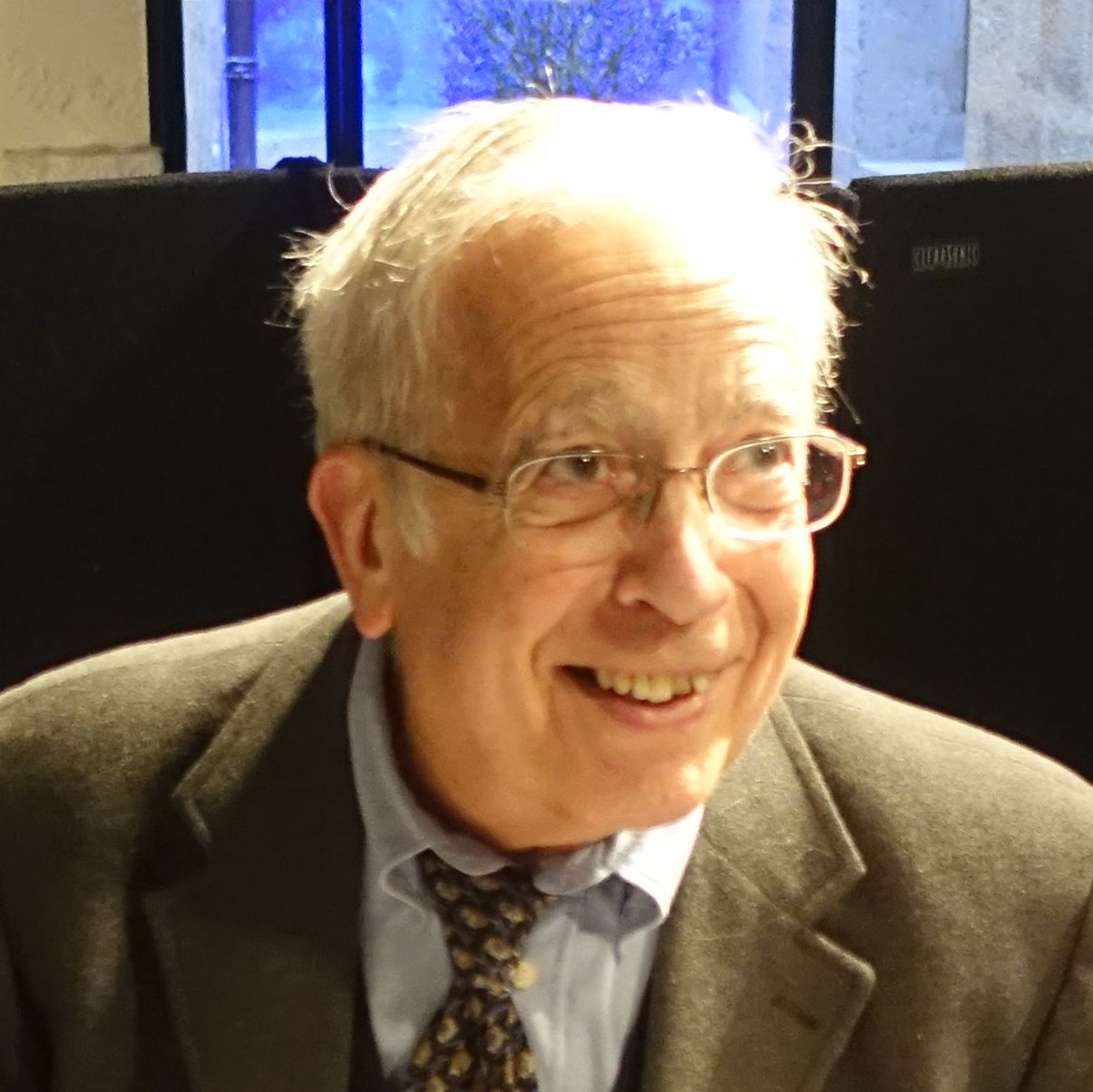
Yann Le Bohec

Yann Le Bohec (26 April 1943, Carthage) is a French historian and epigraphist, specializing in ancient Rome, in particular North Africa during Antiquity and military history.

== Works ==
=== Military History ===
- 1979: L’archéologie militaire de l’Afrique du nord dans l’Antiquité (in French). Paris: Presses de l'ENS. p. 39.
- 1989: La Troisième légion Auguste. Etudes d'antiquités africaines (in French). Paris: CNRS. p. 632. ISBN 2-222-03988-6.
- 1989: Les Unités auxiliaires de l'armée romaine en Afrique proconsulaire et Numidie sous le Haut Empire. Études d'antiquités africaines (in French). Paris: CNRS. p. 220. ISBN 2-222-04239-9.
- 1990: La Sardaigne et l'armée romaine sous le Haut-Empire (in French). Sassari. p. 156. ISBN 9788871380131.
- 1995: Histoire militaire des guerres puniques. L'art de la guerre (in French). Monaco & Paris: Rocher. p. 342. ISBN 2-268-02147-5.
- 2001: César chef de guerre; César stratège et tacticien. L'art de la guerre (in French). Monaco & Paris: Rocher. p. 511. ISBN 2-268-03881-5.
- 2002: L'armée romaine sous le Haut-Empire. Antiquité-synthèses (in French). Paris: Picard. p. 292. ISBN 2-7084-0633-7.
- 2006: L’armée romaine sous le Bas-Empire. Antiquité-synthèses (in French). Paris: Picard. p. 256. ISBN 2-7084-0765-1.
- 2009: L'armée romaine dans la tourmente; une nouvelle approche de la crise du troisième siècle. L'art de la guerre (in French). Monaco, Paris: Rocher. p. 320. ISBN 978-2-268-06785-8.
- 2012: Alésia : Fin août-début octobre de 52 avant J-C., Paris, Tallandier
- 2013: La « bataille » du Teutoburg, 9 apr. J.-C., Paris, Éditions Lemme, series "Illustoria"
- 2013: La bataille de Lyon, 197 apr. J.-C., Paris, Éditions Lemme, series "Illustoria"
- 2014: La Guerre romaine; 58 avant J.-C.-235 après J.-C. L'art de la guerre (in French). Monaco & Paris: Tallandier. p. 448. ISBN 979-10-210-0463-4.
- 2014: Histoire militaire des guerres puniques : 264-146 av. J.-C., Paris, Tallandier, series "Texto"
- 2014: Géopolitique de l'Empire Romain, Paris, Ellipses
- 2015: The Encyclopedia of the Roman Army. Wiley-Blackwell. ISBN 978-1405176194.
- 2016: Spartacus, chef de guerre. L'art de la guerre (in French). Paris: Tallandier. p. 220.

=== Other ===
- 1991: Yann Le Bohec; Marcel Le Glay; Jean-Louis Voisin. Histoire romaine. Quadrige (in French). Paris: Presses universitaires de France (PUF). p. 593. ISBN 978-2-13-058910-5.
- 1993: Yann Le Bohec, Christophe Badel, Sources d'histoire romaine: Ier siècle av. J.C., début du Ve siècle après J.C, Paris, Larousse, series "Textes essentiels"
- 1994: César. Que sais-je? n° 1049 (in French). Paris: PUF. p. 128. ISBN 978-2130461425.
- 1997: Histoire romaine; Textes et documents. Premier cycle (in French). Paris: PUF. p. 538. ISBN 978-2130477846.
- 2001: Urbs; Rome, de César à Commode : histoire d'une ville et d'une capitale. Synthèse d'histoire romaine (in French). Paris: Éditions du Temps. p. 190. ISBN 2-84274-174-9.
- 2003: Les inscriptions des Lingons; Inscriptions sur pierre, inscriptions latines de la Gaule Belgique. Archéologie et d'histoire de l'art (in French). Paris: Comité des travaux historiques et scientifiques. p. 366. ISBN 2-7355-0515-4.
- 2004: De Zeus à Allah. les grandes religions du monde méditerranéen [under his direction], Paris, Éditions du Temps
- 2004: Les religions triomphantes au Moyen Âge : De Mahomet à Thomas d'Aquin [under his direction], Paris, Éditions du Temps
- 2005: Histoire de l’Afrique romaine; 146 avant J.-C. - 439 après J.-C. Antiquité-synthèses (in French). Paris: Picard. p. 282. ISBN 2-7084-0751-1.
- 2012: Naissance, vie et mort de l’Empire romain; de la fin du Ier avant notre ère jusqu'au V de notre ère. Antiquité-synthèses (in French). Paris: Picard. p. 847. ISBN 978-2-7084-0930-9.
- 2012: Histoire de la Rome antique. Que sais-je? n°3955 (in French). Paris: PUF. p. 127. ISBN 978-2-13-059106-1.
- 2013: Rome; un conte d'amour et de mort (in French). Paris: PUF. p. 128. ISBN 978-2-13-060762-5.

=== Popular science articles ===
- 2009: "Rome : un état aristocratique". La Nouvelle Revue d'Histoire. No. 53.
