= Hasdrubal the Boetharch =

Carthaginian leader in the Third Punic War (149–146 BC)

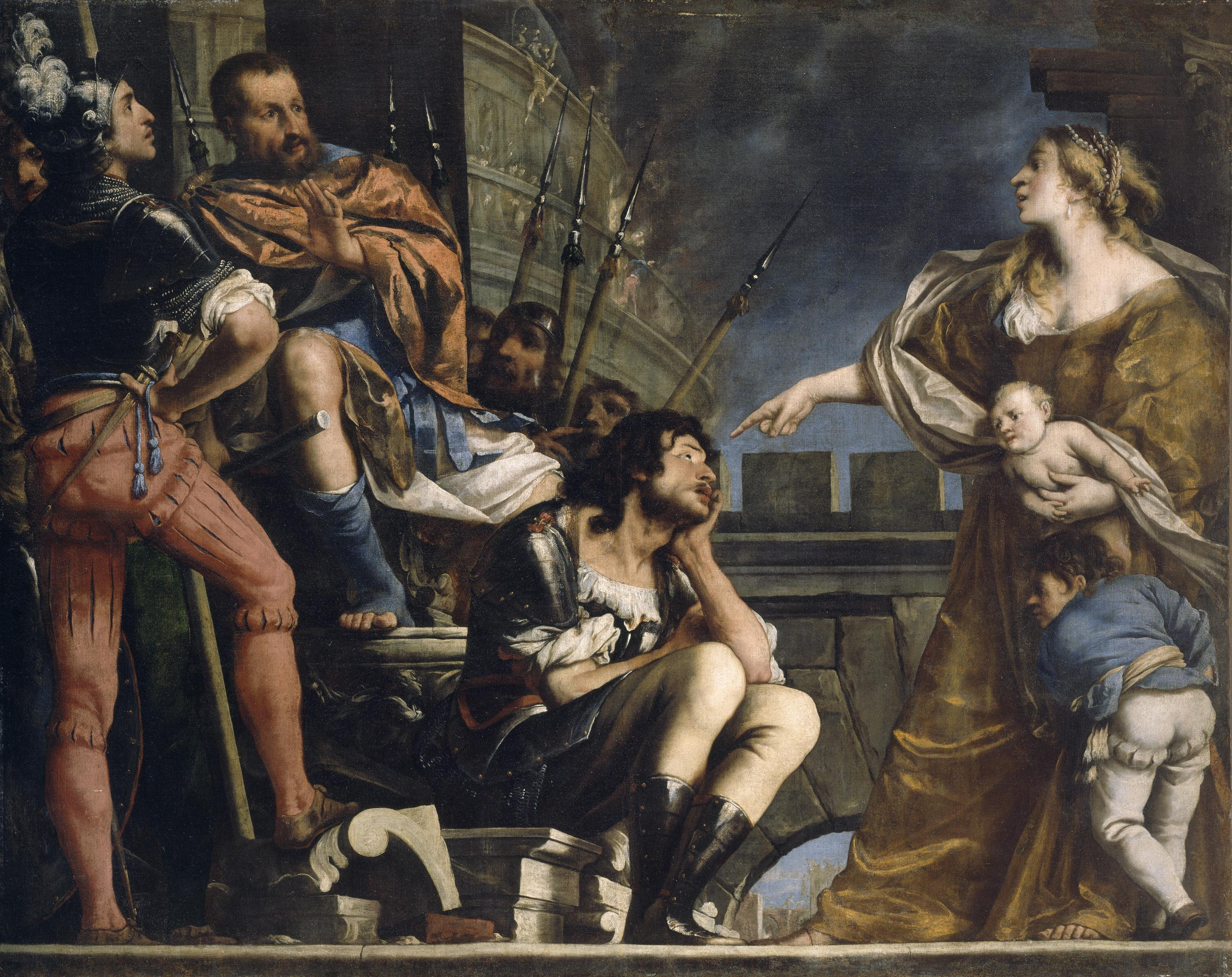
- Hasdrubal the Boetharch sitting on the throne
- Native name: 𐤏𐤆𐤓𐤁𐤏𐤋 ʿZRBʿL
- Allegiance: Ancient Carthage
- Rank: Commander-in-chief
- Conflicts: Third Punic War: Battle of Oroscopa; Battle of Carthage; Battle of Nepheris; Siege of Aspis; Siege of Carthage

Hasdrubal the Boetharch (Punic: 𐤏𐤆𐤓𐤁𐤏𐤋, ʿAzrubaʿal) was a Carthaginian general during the Third Punic War (149–146 BC). Little is known about him. "Boetharch" was a Carthaginian office, the exact function of which is unclear. Its name may derive from the Ancient Greek term "βοηθός (boēthós)" or "auxiliary," suggesting a leadership role among Carthage's mercenary armies. It is not related to the Greek title boeotarch—a leader of the Boeotian Confederacy.

== Life ==
The Second Punic War ended in 201 BC, and the peace settlement did not allow Carthage to wage any war without Rome's permission. Masinissa of Numidia, an ally of Rome, took advantage of this to raid and seize Carthaginian territory. In 149 BC, Carthage sent an army under Hasdrubal against Masinissa, in breach of the treaty. The campaign ended at the Battle of Oroscopa, where Carthage was defeated and Hasdrubal surrendered its army.

Hasdrubal survived to lead the Carthaginian forces at the Siege of Carthage in 146 BC. Their defeat by Scipio Aemilianus, proconsul of the Roman Republic, brought the war to a close.

According to Polybius, after Hasdrubal surrendered, his wife cursed him, cut the throats of their two sons, threw them into a burning temple, and then threw herself into the fire. Hasdrubal was taken to Rome and displayed during Scipio's triumph, but later allowed to live in peace in Italy.

This may be the same general Hasdrubal who was defeated near the town of Tunes (now Tunis) by the Numidian king, Masinissa, just after war was declared in 149 BC.

== See also ==
- Other Hasdrubals in Carthaginian history
