= Battle of Mylae =

Naval battle in 260 BC

- Part of the First Punic War
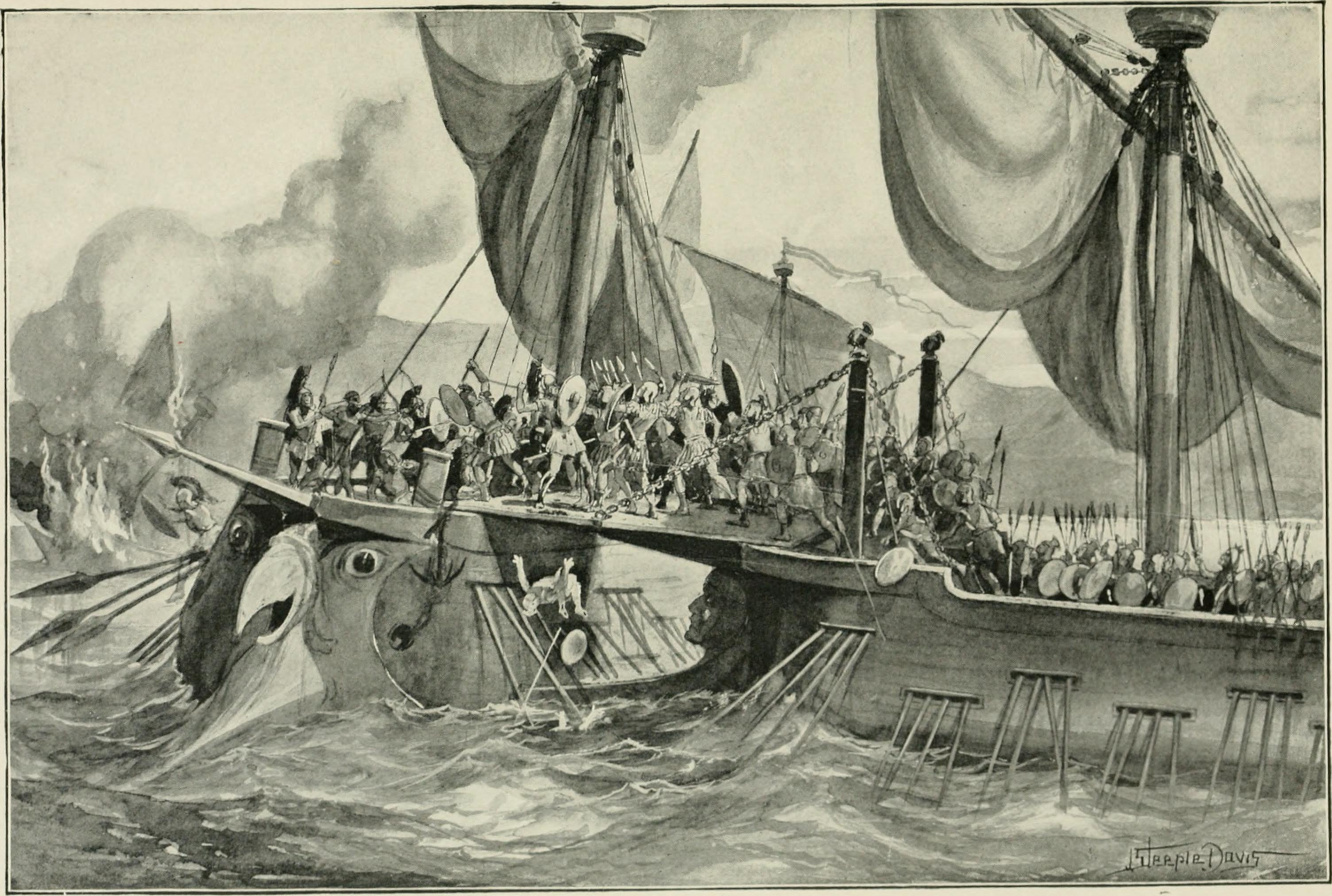
- J. S. Davis: Battle of Mylae in 260 BC (c. 1900)
Date	260 BC
Location	Offshore Mylae, northern Sicily 38.2167°N 15.2333°E
Result	Roman victory

Belligerents
Roman Republic	Carthage

Commanders and leaders
Gaius Duilius	Hannibal Gisco

Strength
143 ships	130 ships

Casualties and losses
Unknown	44 ships 10,000 men 13 ships sunk 1 septireme captured 30 quinqueremes and triremes captured 7,000 killed 3,000 captured

The Battle of Mylae took place in 260 BC during the First Punic War and was the first real naval battle between Carthage and the Roman Republic. This battle was key in the Roman victory of Mylae (present-day Milazzo) as well as Sicily itself. It also marked Rome's first naval triumph and also the first use of the corvus in battle.

== Prelude ==
Inspired by success in the battle of Agrigentum, the Romans sought to win all of Sicily, but required naval power to do so. In order to challenge the already prominent Carthaginian naval forces, Rome built a fleet of one hundred quinqueremes and twenty triremes. The famous Greek historian Polybius wrote that Rome used a wrecked Carthaginian quinquereme captured at Messina as a model for the entire fleet, and that the Romans would have otherwise had no basis for design. However, this may have been an exaggeration, as the Romans had also borrowed Greek quinqueremes previously in 264.

Roman ships were fitted with a boarding device called the corvus, enabling enemy vessels to be boarded and seized.

Rome's two consuls of 260 were Gnaeus Cornelius Scipio Asina and Gaius Duilius. It had been decided that the former would handle the fleet and that Duilius would command the army. However, Scipio's first encounter with the enemy in the Battle of the Lipari Islands led to the loss of 17 ships and an embarrassing surrender to the Carthaginians under the general Senator Boodes and the naval commander Hannibal Gisco. This was the same Hannibal who had retreated after the conquest of Agrigentum, but not the famous Hannibal who would much later invade Italy during the Second Punic War. After Scipio Asina's surrender, the remaining fleet was placed in the hands of Duilius, and the foot soldiers were turned over to military tribunes.

The Romans recognized their weakness in naval power and tactics, especially after the incident of the Lipari Islands. With this in mind they constructed the corvus, a plank to link ships together at sea. The inventor of the corvus is unknown, but it could have been a Syracusan, such as Archimedes. This device would be attached to the prow of Roman ships on a rotating axle, so that it could be swung around; and its spiked end could then be dropped onto an enemy ship. In this way the Romans could still make use of their superior soldiers by loading them across the corvus and onto enemy ships.

== Battle ==
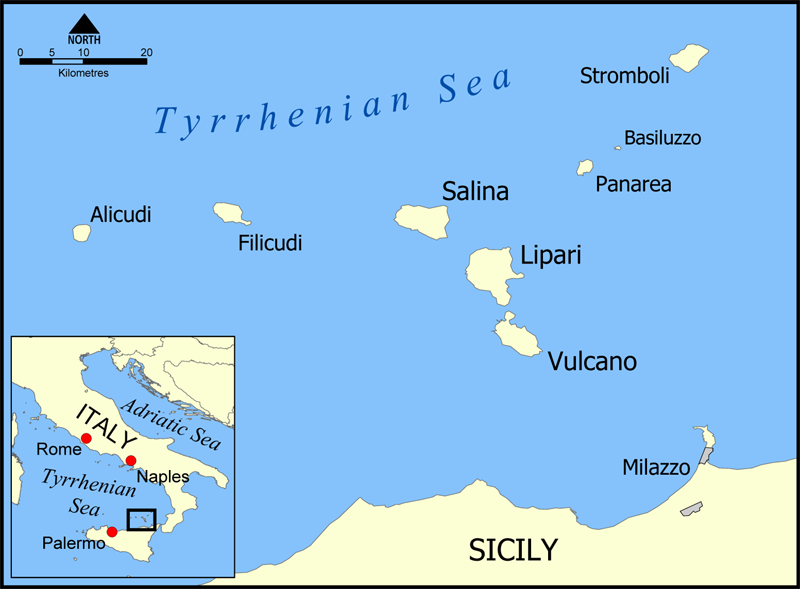
Location of Mylae (Milazzo) on the coast of northern Sicily

Duilius met Hannibal off northern Mylae in 260. Polybius states that the Carthaginians had 130 ships, but does not give an exact figure for the Romans. The loss of 17 ships at the Lipari Islands from a starting total of 120 ships suggests that Rome had 103 remaining. However, it is possible that this number was larger than 103, thanks to captured ships and the assistance of Roman allies. The Carthaginians anticipated victory, especially because of their superior experience at sea.

The corvi helped the Romans seize the first 30 Carthaginian ships that got close enough, including the Carthaginian flagship. To avoid the corvi, the Carthaginians were forced to navigate around them and approach the Romans from behind, or from the side. The corvi were usually still able to pivot and grapple most oncoming ships. Once an additional 20 of the Carthaginian ships had been hooked and lost to the Romans, Hannibal retreated with his surviving ships, leaving Duilius with a clear victory. In 2008, a rostrum was found off Acqualadroni. C14 dating indicates that this rostrum could have belonged to the Carthaginian fleet. Instead of following the remaining Carthaginians at sea, Duilius sailed to Sicily to retrieve control of the troops. There he saved the city of Segesta, which had been under siege from the Carthaginian infantry commander Hamilcar. Modern historians have wondered at Duilius' decision not to immediately follow up with another naval attack, but Hannibal's remaining 80 ships were probably still too strong for Rome to conquer.

== Aftermath ==
Success at Mylae allowed the Romans to pursue Hannibal to Sardinia, where the Romans again defeated him in the Battle of Sulci. At this point Hannibal was arrested by his own men back in Carthage and crucified for his incompetence. As for Duilius, a rostral column, or victory column, was raised with an inscription in his honor in the Forum. The remnants of this inscription were found at Rome and are now kept in the Capitoline Museum. The inscription reports that during the Battle of Mylae Duilius captured 31 ships, sunk 13 more, and took booty of gold and silver worth at least 2,100,000 sesterces. Upon returning home Duilius received Rome's first naval triumph, which the inscription boasts was the first triumph to include native free-born Carthaginians. He also built a Temple of Janus in the Forum Holitorium, some of which can still be seen in the walls of the church of San Nicola in Carcere. Despite his success, Duilius never held another office of high command, although he became censor in 258 BC.

== Cultural depictions ==
In T. S. Eliot's poem The Waste Land, Part I, "The Burial of the Dead" ends with the following passage:

There I saw one I knew, and called him, crying:
Stetson! You who were with me in the ships at Mylae.
That corpse you planted last year in your garden:
Has it begun to sprout? Will it bloom this year?
Or has the sudden frost disturbed its bed?
Oh, keep the dog far hence, that's friend to men,
Or with his nails, he'll dig it up again.
You! hypocrite lecteur!—mon semblable,—mon frère!

== Sources ==
- Bagnall, Nigel (1990). The Punic Wars: Rome, Carthage, and the Struggle for the Mediterranean. New York: St. Martin's Press. ISBN 0-312-34214-4.
- Goldsworthy, Keith Adrian (2000). The Punic Wars. Cassell. ISBN 0-304-35967-X., later published as The Fall of Carthage: The Punic Wars 265–146 BC (Cassell, 2003) ISBN 0-304-36642-0
- Dorey, T. A.; D. R. Dudley (1972). Rome against Carthage. Garden City, NY: Doubleday.
- Lazenby, J. F. (1996). The First Punic War: A Military History. Stanford, CA: Stanford University Press. ISBN 0-8047-2674-4.
- Polybius. The General History of Polybius. In five books. Translated from the Greek by James Hampton. 3rd edition. Vol. I. London, 1772. Eighteenth Century Collections Online. Gale Group.
- E. H. Warmington, ed. (1935–1940). Remains of Old Latin. Vol. 4 vols. Cambridge, MA: Harvard University Press.
