= Sulci =

Sulci Σολκοί
- City
- Location within Sardinia
- Coordinates: 39°04′N 08°27′E
- Country: Italy

Sulci or Sulki (in Greek Σολκοί, Steph. B., Ptol.; Σοῦλχοι, Strabo; Σύλκοι, Paus.), was one of the most considerable cities of ancient Sardinia, situated in the southwest corner of the island, on a small island, now called Isola di Sant'Antioco, which is, however, joined to the mainland by a narrow isthmus or neck of sand. South of this isthmus, between the island and the mainland, is an extensive bay, now called the Golfo di Palmas, which was known in ancient times as the Sulcitanus Portus (Ptol.).

== Origins ==
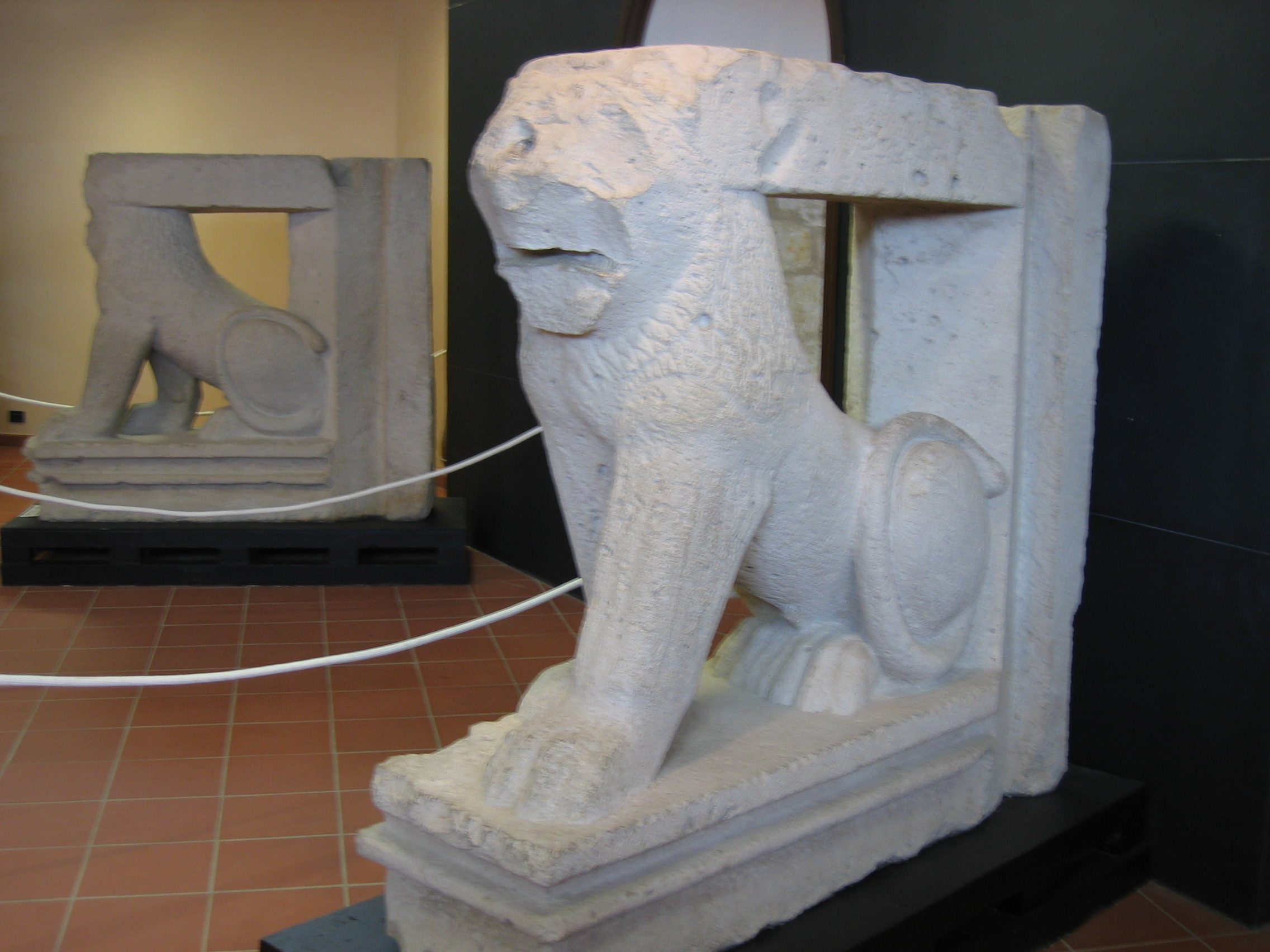
Lion statues

The foundation of Sulci (Punic: slky) is expressly attributed to the Carthaginians (Paus. x. 17. § 9; Claudian, B. Gild. 518), and it seems to have become under that people one of the most considerable cities of Sardinia, and one of the chief seats of their power in the island. However, as noted by archaeologists the city was founded by Tyrians during the late 9th century BCE, and most of the inhabitants were probably native Sardinians, it remained independent until Carthage conquered it in the late 6th century BCE Its name was first mentioned in history during the First Punic War, when the Carthaginian general, Hannibal Gisco, having been defeated in a sea-fight (the Battle of Sulci, 258 BCE) by Gaius Sulpicius Paterculus, took refuge at Sulci, but was slain in a tumult by his own soldiers (Zonaras viii. 12).

== Caesar's civil war ==
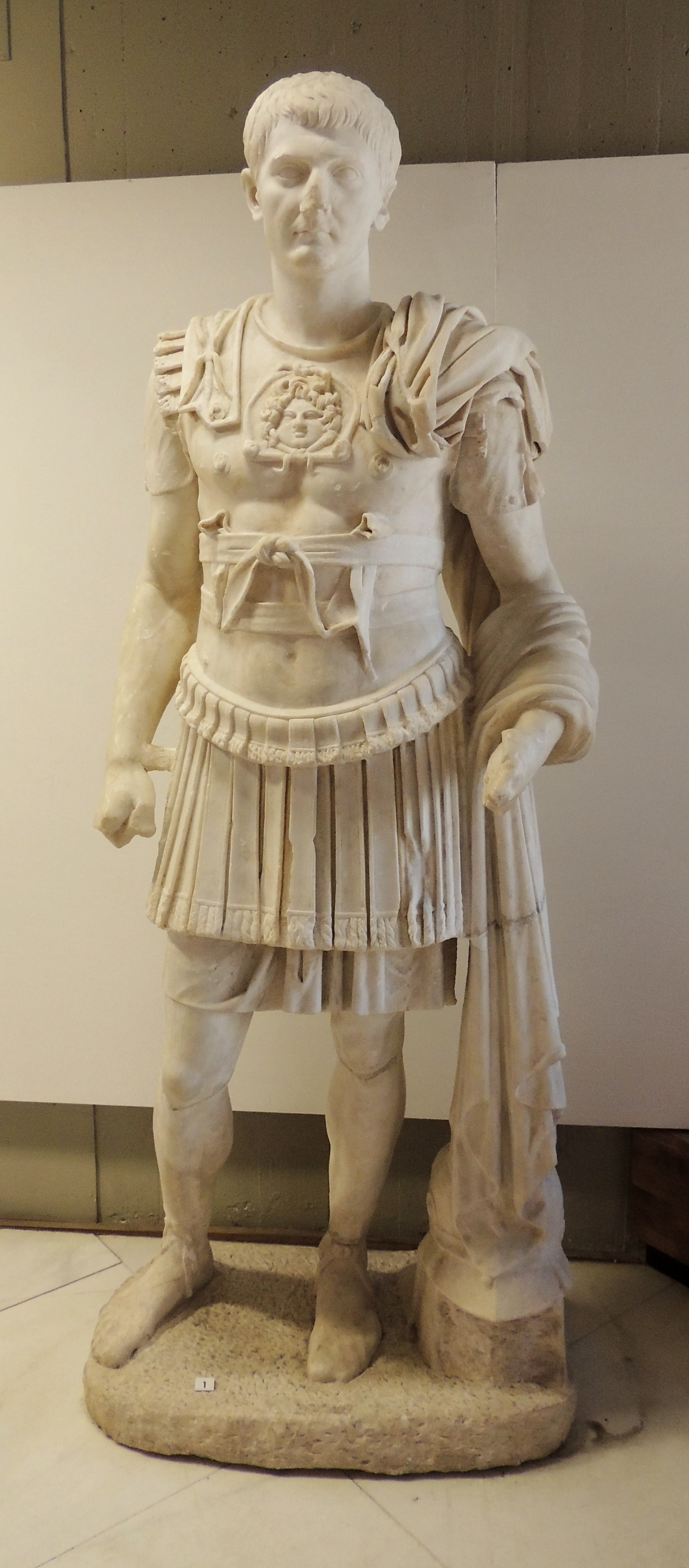
Drusus Julius Caesar statue from Sulci, National Archeological Museum of Cagliari

No other mention of the name occurs in history until the civil war between Pompey and Caesar. The citizens of Sulci received in their port the fleet of Nasidius, the admiral of Pompey, and furnished Pompey with supplies; for which service they were severely punished by Caesar, on his return from Africa, 46 BCE. Caesar imposed on the city a contribution of 100,000 sesterces, besides heavily increasing its annual tribute of corn (Hirt. B. Aft. 98).

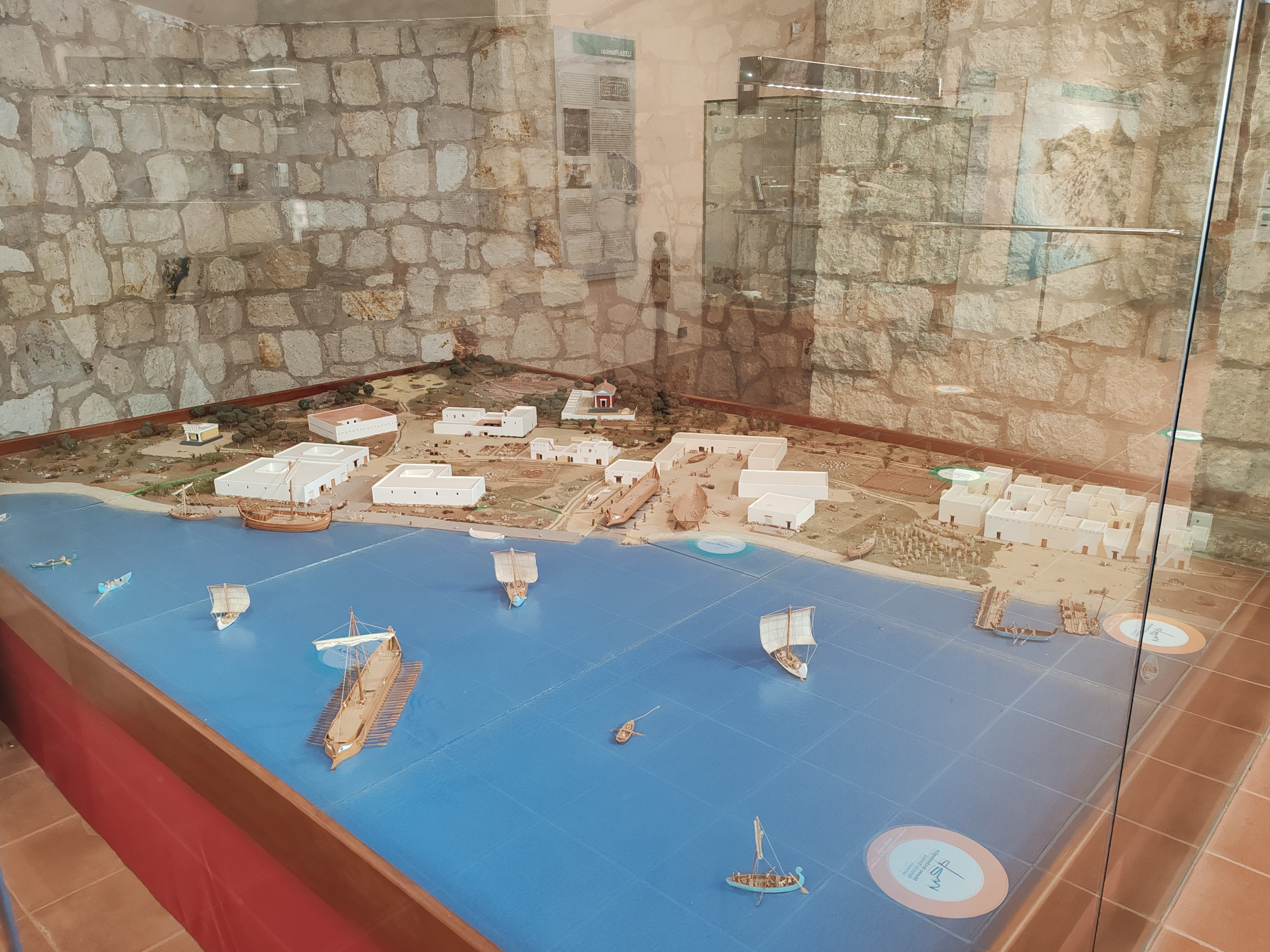
Reconstruction of the port of Sulci

Notwithstanding this infliction, Sulci seems to have continued under the Roman Empire to be one of the most flourishing towns in the island. Strabo and Mela both mention it as if it were the second city in Sardinia; and its municipal rank is attested by inscriptions, as well as by Pliny. (Strab. v. p. 225; Mel. ii. 7. § 19; Plin. iii. 7. s. 13; Ptol. iii. 3. § 3; Inset. ap De la Marmora, vol. ii. pp. 479, 482.) The Itineraries give a line of road proceeding from Tibula (at the extreme north of Sardinia) direct to Sulci, a sufficient proof of the importance of the latter place. (Itin. Ant. pp. 83, 84.) It was also one of the four chief episcopal sees into which Sardinia was divided, and seems to have continued to be inhabited through a great part of the Middle Ages, but ceased to exist before the 13th century.

== Present day ==
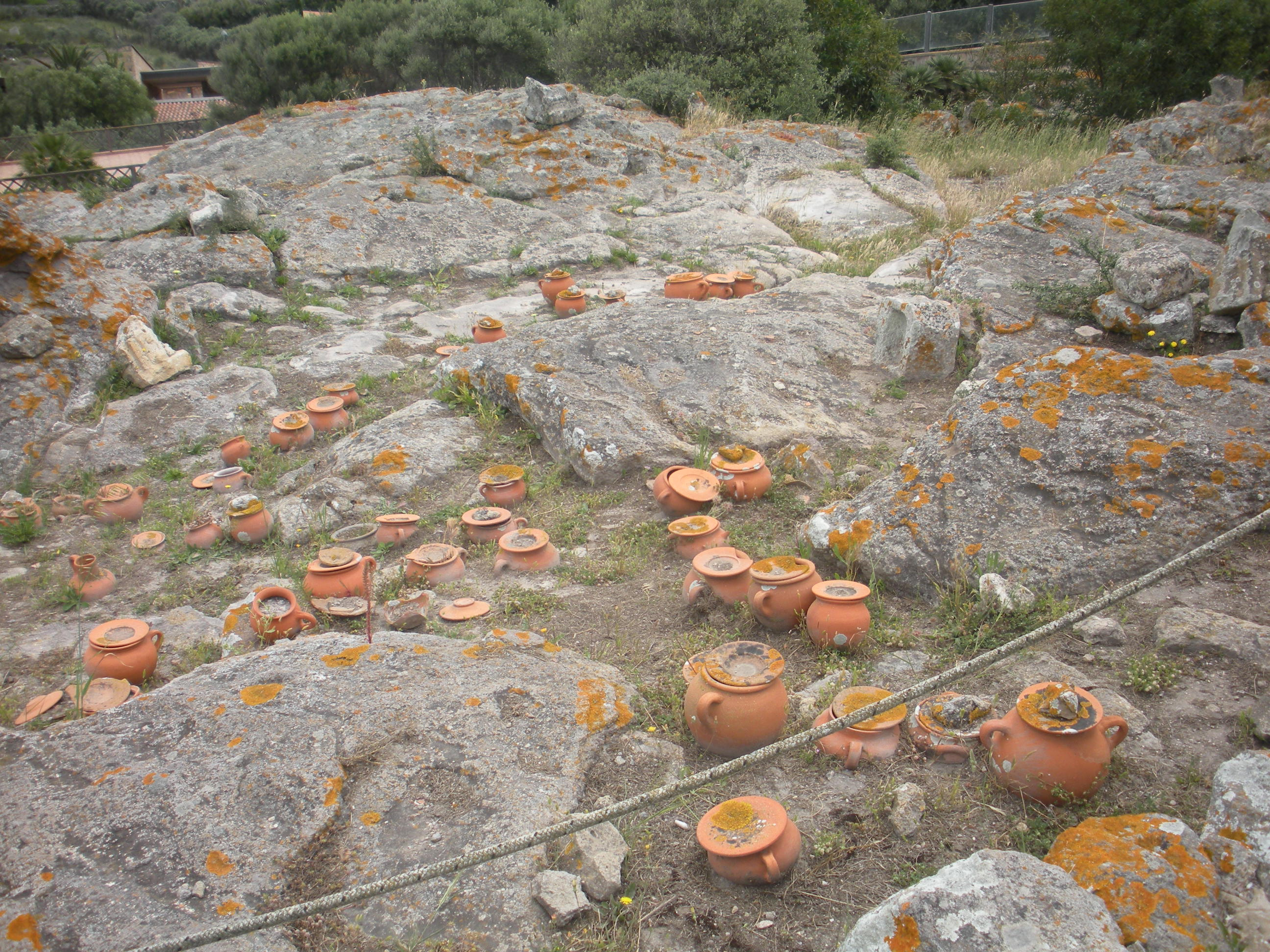
Tophet

The remains of the ancient city are distinctly seen a little to the north of the modern town of Sant'Antioco, on the island or peninsula of the same name: and the works of art which have been found there bear testimony to its flourishing condition under the Romans. (De la Marmora, vol. ii. p. 357; Smyth's Sardinia, p. 317.) The name of Sulcis is given at the present day to the whole district of the mainland, immediately opposite to Sant'Antioco, which is one of the most fertile and best cultivated tracts in the whole of Sardinia. The Sulcitani of Ptolemy (iii. 3. § 6) are evidently the inhabitants of this district.

The Itineraries mention a town or village of the name of Sulci on the E. coast of Sardinia, which must not be confounded with the more celebrated city of the name. (Itin. Ant. p. 80.) It was probably situated at Girasole (De la Marmora, p. 443) or Tortolì.

== See also ==
- Sulcis
- Sulcis Mountains
- Sulcis-Iglesiente
