= Aulus Atilius Caiatinus =

Roman general and statesman

- Resting place: Near the Porta Capena
- Years active: fl. 258–241 BC
- Office: Consul (258, 254 BC); Praetor (257 BC); Dictator (249 BC); Censor (247 BC)

Military service
- Battles/wars: First Punic War
- Awards: Triumph (256 BC)

Aulus Atilius Caiatinus (or Calatinus; fl. 258–241 BC) was a Roman general and statesman who achieved prominence for his military activities during the First Punic War against Carthage. As consul in 258 BC, he enjoyed several successes in Sicily, for which he later celebrated a triumph. He undertook further campaigning in Sicily both at sea and on land during a second consulship (254 BC) and then as dictator (249 BC), becoming the first Roman dictator to lead an army outside mainland Italy.

Atilius held the office of censor in 247, the crowning achievement of a public career at the time. He later dedicated temples to Spes and Fides at Rome.

== Biography ==
=== Background and family ===
Aulus Atilius Caiatinus, or Calatinus, probably belonged to an aristocratic family from Campania which had been welcomed to Roman high society following the region's conquest by Rome during the Samnite Wars in the 4th century BC. The surname Caiatinus (or Calatinus) indicates that an ancestor came from, or held estates near, the Campanian town of Caiatia (or Calatia). (Note: The literary sources almost invariably spell his surname Calatinus, but the official list of Roman magistrates compiled by the emperor Augustus (the fasti Capitolini) displays it as Caiatinus. The latter spelling is usually preferred on the grounds that official records are more reliable and that Caiatia is more likely to have been misidentified with Calatia, the more important town, than vice versa.) The plebeian clan of the Atilii soon began attaining the highest offices of the Roman state, reaching a high point in its prestige around the time of the First Punic War (264–241 BC), with the successful careers of Atilius Caiatinus and several of his relatives (like Marcus Atilius Regulus and Gaius Atilius Bulbus).

Friedrich Münzer, in his influential study of the role of family relationships in Roman Republican politics, argued that this quick rise to prominence was the result of an alliance with the long-established patrician clan of the Fabii. Atilius Caiatinus himself seems to have been a maternal grandson of Fabius Rullianus, one of Rome's heroes during the Samnite Wars; (Note: This is deduced from an anecdote provided by Valerius Maximus, according to which another Aulus Atilius Caiatinus was saved from disgrace by Rullianus, his father-in-law, after falling under suspicion of betraying the town of Sora to the Samnites in 306 BC. Münzer identifies this man as the younger Atilius's father, whose forename 'Aulus' is confirmed by independent evidence. Oakley notes that one manuscript of Valerius Maximus's work gives 'Marcus' instead of 'Aulus', which, if correct, would mean that Rullianus's son-in-law was another member of the family.) his parents' marriage is one of the earliest recorded unions between patricians and plebeians. Oakley dated his birth around 300–295 BC.

=== First Punic War ===
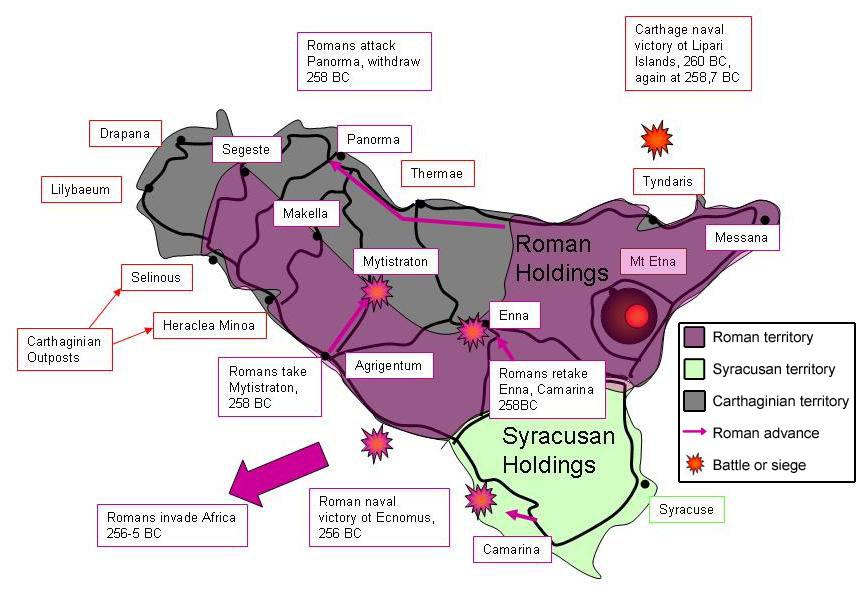
Military operations in Sicily, 260–256 BC

Atilius was one of the two Roman consuls of 258 BC, alongside Gaius Sulpicius Paterculus. At the start of the campaigning season he was sent to Sicily to conduct the war against the Carthaginians there. Joining the previous year's consul, Gaius Aquillius Florus, he first went to Panormus to draw out some Punic troops who had been wintering there. When this failed, he moved on to Hippana and promptly took it by storm. Atilius afterward resumed the siege of Mytistraton, which Florus had tried to take without success the previous year, and obtained its surrender after the Carthaginian garrison withdrew during the night. The city was plundered and burnt to the ground, its inhabitants slaughtered or enslaved.

The ancient sources go on to report a story which has Atilius being ambushed at a narrow mountain pass while on the way to attack Camarina, only to be saved by the self-sacrifice of a tribune and 300 men, who held the enemy off until Atilius could extricate his army from danger, though the historicity of this anecdote has been doubted. (Note: Lazenby, for example, notes that the number of Roman combatants mirrors the 300 Spartans at Thermopylae, and that the sources also disagree on the tribune's name.) Camarina itself was taken, as was Enna, the latter through treachery. An attempt by Atilius to seize the island of Lipara ended in failure. His command in Sicily continued through 257 BC with his election (presumably in absentia) to the office of praetor, though he and his fellow commander Cornelius Blasio, one of the consuls, seem to have accomplished nothing worth of note this year. For his successes in 258, Atilius celebrated a triumph back at Rome on 19 January 256 BC.

Atilius was elected consul for a second time in 254 BC, probably chosen for his experience. He and his colleague in office, Cornelius Scipio Asina, led a newly built fleet to Sicily and took Cephaloedium by treachery, but their subsequent attack on Drepana was repulsed by the Carthaginian Carthalo. The Romans then captured Panormus and other towns, though only the consul Scipio later celebrated a triumph for these victories; Lazenby suggests that this was because the consuls split their forces, with Scipio in charge of Panormus, the main target, while Atilius led the unsuccessful attack on Drepana, perhaps as a diversion. The consuls then withdrew to Messana, and Atilius then to Rome, taking the fleet with him.

In 249 BC, Atilius was appointed dictator in the aftermath of the Roman disaster at the naval Battle of Drepana. His deputy or 'master of the horse' (magister equitum) was Lucius Caecilius Metellus. He was sent to Sicily, where he did not achieve anything remarkable, though this made him the first Roman dictator to lead an army outside of Italy.

=== Later life ===
Atilius was elected censor in 247 BC, as the plebeian counterpart to the patrician Aulus Manlius Torquatus Atticus. A factor in his election may have been his kinship to one of that year's consuls, Numerius Fabius. In the census conducted during their censorship 241,212 adult male Roman citizens were recorded. This was a sharp decline from the number recorded in the 252 BC census – 297,797 – indicating the heavy toll that the war with Carthage had taken on the Roman population.

In 241 BC Atilius mediated a dispute between two commanders, the proconsul Lutatius Catulus and the propraetor Valerius Falto, regarding whom should celebrate a triumph for the Roman victory at the Battle of the Aegates. T. Corey Brennan says that "there was simply no other man in Rome so qualified to judge" the dispute, with Atilius having had a distinguished career and obtained the highest military and state honors. Atilius seems to have ruled the case in favor of Catulus, though in the end both parties celebrated triumphs.

Atilius dedicated a temple to Spes in the Forum Holitorium and another to Fides on the Capitoline Hill. His tomb was located at the Porta Capena, and Cicero preserves part of his epitaph.

== Citations ==
Political offices
Preceded by Lucius Cornelius Scipio; Gaius Aquillius Florus	Roman consul 258 BC; With: Gaius Sulpicius Paterculus	Succeeded by Gaius Atilius Regulus; Gnaeus Cornelius Blasio
Preceded by Marcus Aemilius Paullus; Servius Fulvius Paetinus Nobilior	Roman consul II; 254 BC; With: Gnaeus Cornelius Scipio Asina	Succeeded by Gnaeus Servilius Caepio; Gaius Sempronius Blaesus
Preceded by Manius Valerius Maximus Messalla; Publius Sempronius Sophus	Roman censor 247 BC; With: Aulus Manlius Torquatus Atticus	Succeeded by Marcus Fabius Buteo; Gaius Aurelius Cotta
