= Gaius Aquillius =

Gaius Aquillius may refer to:

- Gaius Aquillius Tuscus, Roman consul in 487 BC
- Gaius Aquillius Florus, Roman consul in 259 BC
