= Hannibal Gisco =

Carthaginian commander during the First Punic War

Hannibal Gisco (Punic: 𐤇𐤍𐤁𐤏𐤋, ḤNBʿL; c. 295–258 BC) was a Carthaginian military commander in charge of both land armies and naval fleets during the First Punic War against Rome. His efforts proved ultimately unsuccessful and his eventual defeat in battle led to his downfall and execution.

== Life and career ==
The details of Hannibal Gisco's early life and career are unknown.

=== Agrigentum ===
Hannibal Gisco's first appearance in the sources is in 262 BC, as the general in command of the garrison besieged by the Romans in Agrigentum. Despite the tenacity shown by Gisco and his men for months and the arrival of reinforcements led by Hanno, the city eventually fell into Roman hands. Gisco managed to escape to Carthage in the late stages of the battle.

=== The Straits of Messina ===
Apparently, the defeat at Agrigentum did not bar Gisco from continuing leadership. In the following year, 260 BC, Gisco returned as the admiral in charge of the Carthaginian fleet in the Straits of Messina. The Romans were about to launch their first-ever navy, and Carthage had determined that this innovation should be thwarted. Gisco defeated and captured the Roman consul Gnaeus Cornelius Scipio Asina in the Lipari encounter, which earned Scipio the nickname Asina ("Donkey"). However, this victory was robbed of practical meaning with the bulk of the Roman fleet continuing to maneuver in the surrounding waters.

=== Mylae ===
Later in 260 BC, Gisco was to engage this fleet and to be the first Punic general to encounter the Roman corvus boarding device with its deadly effect. Confident in Carthage's superiority at sea, Gisco deployed his ships for the Battle of Mylae in the traditional long line arrangement. Although inexperienced in sea battle, the Romans, led by consul Gaius Duilius, heavily defeated the Carthaginian fleet, mainly due to the innovative use of land tactics in naval warfare.

Hannibal was recalled, but his fall from favor did not last long. In 258, he was sent to Sardinia, which he had to defend against the Romans. However, he was no match for the Roman commander Gaius Sulpicius Paterculus, who defeated him at the Battle of Sulci.

Having lost the confidence of his peers, Hannibal Gisco was subsequently executed for incompetence shortly afterwards, together with other defeated Punic generals. According to some references he was crucified by his own men.

== See also ==
- Other Hannibals in Carthaginian history
