= Hanno (son of Hannibal) =

Carthaginian general from the First Punic War

Hanno (Punic: 𐤇𐤍𐤀 Ḥɴʾ), whose full name was in Phoenician 𐤇𐤍𐤀 𐤁𐤍 𐤇𐤍𐤁𐤏𐤋 Hna Ben Hanibal) or Hanno son of Hannibal, was, according to Diodorus Siculus, a Carthaginian general during the First Punic War (264 to 241 BC).

Note that this entry is not related to the son of Hammilcar Barca Hannibal, whose son was probably also named Hanno (𐤇𐤍𐤀 Phoenician Hna), and of whom we have very few details of, but belongs to the time of the second Punic wars.

== Historiography ==
Writing in the 1st century B.C., Diodorus Siculus, mentions Hanno in his account of the First Punic War and refers to him as “Hanno, son of Hannibal”, to distinguish him from other Carthaginians of that name.

== Battle of Agrigentum ==
Before the battle, Hannibal Gisco was in the city of Agrigentum, besieged by the Romans, and Hanno was sent to provide relief. Hanno concentrated his troops at Heraclea Minoa and captured the Roman supply base at Herbesos. He told his Numidian cavalry to attack the Roman cavalry and then feign retreat. The Romans pursued the Numidians as they retreated and were brought to the main Carthaginian column where they suffered many losses. According to Polybius, the siege lasted several months before the Romans defeated the Carthaginians and forced Hanno to retreat.

== See also ==
- Other Hannos in Carthaginian history
