= Mytistraton =

Ancient Sicilian town

Mytistraton or Mytistratus or Myttistraton or Mytiseratos (Greek: Μυτίστρατος, Μυτισέρατος Steph. B., Diod.; Μουτίστρατος, Zonar.; τὸ Μυττίστρατον, Pol.), was an ancient town in the interior of Sicily, the site of which is located at modern the località of Monte Castellazzo di Marianopoli, in the comune of Marianopoli, in the Province of Caltanissetta.

It was probably a small town, though strongly fortified, whence Philistus (ap. Steph. B. s. v.) called it a fortress of Sicily. It is conspicuously mentioned during the First Punic War, when it was in the hands of the Carthaginians, and was besieged by the Romans, but for some time unsuccessfully, because of the great strength of its position; it was at length taken by the consul Aulus Atilius Caiatinus in 258 BCE. The inhabitants were either put to the sword or sold as slaves, and the town itself entirely destroyed. (Pol. i. 24; Diod. xxiii. 9, Exc. Hoesch. p. 503; Zonar. viii.) It was, however, again inhabited at a later period, as we find the Mutustratini mentioned by Pliny among the municipal towns of the interior of Sicily (Plin. iii. 8. s. 14) but no notice of its name occurs in the interval.
