= Gaius Aquillius Florus =

Roman general and statesman, consul in 259 BCE

Gaius Aquillius Florus was one of the two consuls of the Roman Republic in the year 259 BCE. His consular colleague was Lucius Cornelius Scipio. Together they fought in the ongoing First Punic War.

Aquillius Florus fought the Carthaginian general Hamilcar on Sicily while his consular collegae attacked the Carthaginian fleet based in Corsica. In 258 BCE, Florus' command was prorogued and he continued his campaign as proconsul.

Political offices
Preceded by Gnaeus Cornelius Scipio Asina; Gaius Duilius	Consul of the Roman Republic; 259 BC; With: Lucius Cornelius Scipio	Succeeded by Aulus Atilius Calatinus; Gaius Sulpicius Paterculus
