= Lucius Cornelius Scipio (consul 259 BC) =

Roman general and statesman

Lucius Cornelius Scipio (born c. 300 BC), consul in 259 BC during the First Punic War, was a consul and censor of ancient Rome. He was the son of Lucius Cornelius Scipio Barbatus, himself consul and censor, and brother to Gnaeus Cornelius Scipio Asina, who was consul twice. Two of his sons (Publius Cornelius Scipio and Gnaeus Cornelius Scipio Calvus) and three of his grandsons (Scipio Africanus, Scipio Asiaticus and Scipio Nasica) also became consuls and were all famous generals. Among these five men, the most famous was Scipio Africanus.

As consul in 259 BC, he led the Roman fleet in the capture of Aleria and then Corsica, but failed against Olbia in Sardinia. The Fasti Triumphales record that he was awarded a triumph, but two other inscriptions on his career do not mention it. The following year he was elected censor with Gaius Duilius. He was succeeded by Gaius Sulpicius Paterculus as second consul.

He later dedicated a temple to the Tempestates, locating it near the Porta Capena.

== Epitaph ==
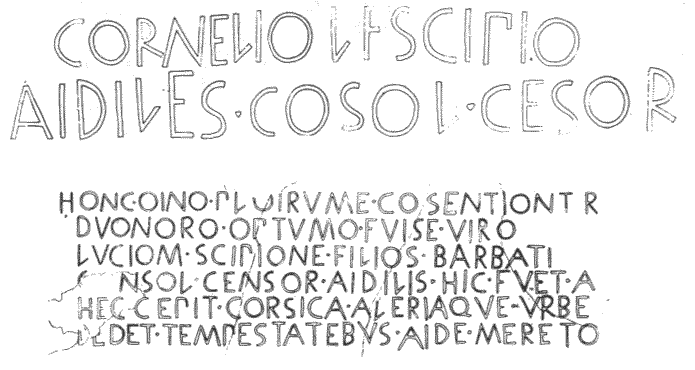
Rubbing of the epitaph.

Fragments of his sarcophagus were discovered in the Tomb of the Scipios and are now in the Vatican Museums. They preserve his epitaph, written in Old Latin:

L·CORNELIO·L·F·SCIPIO
AIDILES·COSOL·CESOR

HONC OINO·PLOIRVME·COSENTIONT R
DVONORO·OPTVMO·FVISE·VIRO
LVCIOM·SCIPIONE·FILIOS·BARBATI
CONSOL·CENSOR·AIDILIS·HIC·FVET·A
НЕС·CE PIT·CORSICA·ALERIAQVE·VRBE
DEDET·TEMPESTATEBVS·AIDE·MERETO

which has been transcribed and restored in modern upper- and lower-case script as:

Honc oino ploirume cosentiont Romai
duonoro optumo fuise viro
Luciom Scipione. Filios Barbati
consol censor aidilis hic fuet apud vos,
hec cepit Corsica Aleriaque urbe,
dedet Tempestatebus aide meretod votam.

and also transcribed in classical Latin as:

Hunc unum plurimi consentiunt Romae
bonorum optimum fuisse virum
Lucium Scipionem. Filius Barbati,
Consul, Censor, Aedilis hic fuit apud vos.
Hic cepit Corsicam Aleriamque urbem
dedit tempestatibus aedem merito votam.

A translation is:

Romans for the most part agree,
that this one man, Lucius Scipio, was the best of good men.
He was the son of Barbatus,
Consul, Censor, Aedile.
He took Corsica and the city of Aleria.
He dedicated a temple to the Storms as a just return.

This inscription is number two of the elogia Scipionum, the several epitaphs surviving from the tomb.

Political offices
Preceded by Gnaeus Cornelius Scipio Asina; Gaius Duilius	Consul of the Roman Republic; 259 BC; With: Gaius Aquillius Florus	Succeeded by Aulus Atilius Calatinus; Gaius Sulpicius Paterculus
Preceded by Gnaeus Cornelius Blasio; Gaius Marcius Rutilus	Roman censor 258–257 BC; With: Gaius Duilius	Succeeded by Decimus Junius Pera; Lucius Postumius Megellus
