= Gnaeus Cornelius Blasio =

Roman general and statesman, consul in 257 BCE

Gnaeus Cornelius Blasio was a Roman statesman and general during the middle era of the Roman Republic. He was one of the two consuls of 257 BCE, serving with Gaius Atilius Regelus. Blasio was considered a princeps (leading member) of the Senate. He was consul during the First Punic War against Carthage. During his consulship he commanded the Republic's land forces on Sicily, while his fellow consul Regelus led the fleet. He did not achieve any stunning victories, but focused on consolidating Rome's power on the island.

== Sources ==
- Jona Lendering, De Vergeten Oorlog, Utrecht, Uitgeverij Omniboek, ISBN 9789401918640.
- Polybius, The Histories, 1.25.6.

Political offices
| Preceded by Aulus Atilius Caiatinus; Gaius Sulpicius Paterculus | Roman consul 257 BC with Gaius Atilius Regelus | Succeeded by Lucius Manlius Vulso Longus; Quintus Caedicius |
