= Italian ship Caio Duilio =

Four ships of the Regia Marina, and the present day Italian Navy, have borne the name Duilio or Caio Duilio, the name commemorating the 3rd century BC Roman naval leader Gaius Duilius:

- Italian ironclad Duilio was an ironclad warship launched in 1876 and scrapped in 1909.
- Italian battleship Duilio was an Andrea Doria-class battleship launched in 1913 and scrapped in 1957.
- Italian cruiser Caio Duilio (C 554) was an Andrea Doria-class helicopter cruiser launched in 1962 and decommissioned in 1990.
- Italian destroyer Caio Duilio (D 554) is an Horizon-class destroyer launched in 2007 and currently in active service.
