= Hippana =

- Ἱππάνα, Ἵπανα (Ancient Greek)
- Hippana, Hipana
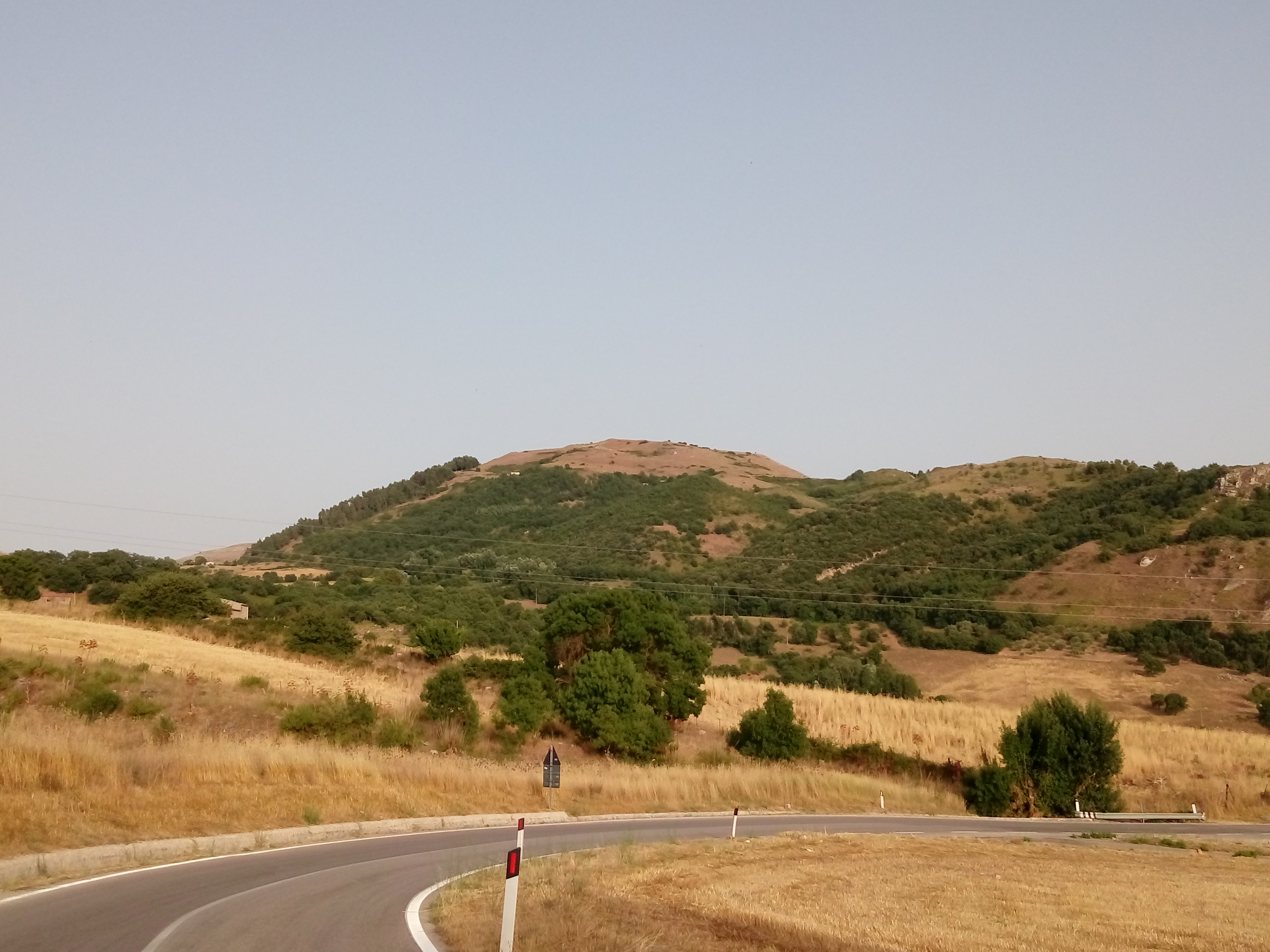
- Monte dei Cavalli, site of Hippana

- Location within Italy
- 37°42′9″N 13°26′13″E
- Type: Settlement
- Periods: Archaic Greek
- Cultures: Ancient Greece
- Location: Prizzi, Italy

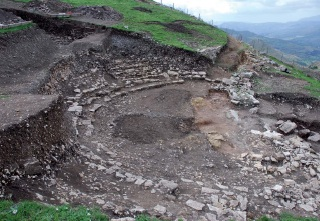
Ancient Theatre

Hippana or Hyppana (Ancient Greek: Ἵππανα), was an ancient town of Sicily. It sat astride the main road from Panormus (modern Palermo) to Agrigentum (modern Agrigento) upon Monte dei Cavalli, in the modern comune of Prizzi. It is an important archaeological site in situated in a central position between the Tyrrhenian coast and the Mediterranean Sea, halfway between Palermo and Agrigentum.

It was mentioned by Polybius as being taken by assault by the Romans in the First Punic War, 260 BC. Diodorus, in relating the events of the same campaign, mentions the capture of a town called "Sittana", for which we should in all probability read "Hippana". The correctness of the name found in Polybius is confirmed by Stephanus of Byzantium (s. v.) who, however, writes it Ἵπανα but cites Polybius as his authority.

Some manuscripts of Pliny mention the name of Ipanenses in his list of Sicilian towns where the older editions have Ichanenses. If this reading be adopted, it in all probability refers to the same place as the Hippana of Polybius; but as the reading Ichanenses is also supported by the authority of Stephanus (who notices Ichana as a town of Sicily), the point must be considered doubtful.

Excavations in 2007 at Montagna dei Cavalli revealed a Greek theatre, one of the earliest known in Sicily and Magna Graecia. It dates to the second half of the 4th century BC and was destroyed in 258 BC, the year of the sacking of the city by the Romans in the first Punic war.

== History ==
=== Sican period ===
Archaeological evidence suggests that an indigenous settlement was present at Montagna dei Cavalli from the 9th century BC. The settlement was certainly flourishing between the 7th and 6th centuries BC and was probably inhabited by Sicans attracted by the favourable setting, with clear defensive capabilities, conditions suitable for agriculture and pastoralism, and several sources of water. The first village probably developed on the highest part of the mountain and along its flanks. The few archaeological discoveries from this phase are a scatter of local ceramics, found in most parts of the settlement. The Sican communities reacted to the foundation of the Greek colonies on the coast (Himera, Selinus, and Acragas) by consolidating ever more in the interior. Cultural and economic links between the various communities developed, which very likely allowed the settlement to flourish in the first decades of the 5th century BC. Such relationships are attested at Montagna dei Cavalli by the discovery of vases imported from the Greek colonies, datable to the first half of the 6th century BC. Alongside the Greek products, indigenous ceramics also circulated, characterised by painted or incised geometric decoration.

From the beginning of the 5th century BC it is difficult to reconstruct the fate of the settlement, but it seems that after a period of relative prosperity, the old indigenous city sunk into a serious crisis, probably culminating in its abandonment.

=== Hellenistic period ===
The late fourth century BC was a period of urban renewal and prosperity for Sicily and it seems that a new city, which the sources call Hippana, grew up at Montagna dei Cavalli in this period. It was within the Carthaginian sphere of influence. Between the end of the 4th century and the first decades of the 3rd century BC, the settlement was the site of a violent episode, perhaps connected with the invasions of western Sicily by Agathocles of Syracuse or Pyrrhus of Epirus, as shown by various renovations to the upper fortifications and some buildings on the acropolis. The prosperity of the city continued until the middle of the 3rd century BC, when there are signs of violent destruction in all parts of the site, which probably led to its abandonment.

Key events of the First Punic War between 258 and 256 BC.

This archaeological evidence is likely connected with the Roman conquest of Hippana in 258 BC, during the First Punic War, as mentioned by Polybius in his Histories, according to whom the city was destroyed by Roman forces led by the consul Aulus Atilius Calatinus:

The generals approached the city with the whole force and drew them up. When the enemy did not come out against them, they made a start on the way back from there towards the city of Hippana and they took control of this through an assault.

— Polybius,Histories 1.24.10-11

The same event seems to be mentioned by Diodorus Siculus, although he calls the city "Sittana", and by Stephanus of Byzantium, who derives his information from Polybius.

== Bibliography ==
- Calderone, Salvatore (1964–1965). "Problemi dell'organizzazione della provincia di Sicilia" [Problems of the organization of the province of Sicily]. Kokalos (in Italian). X–XI: 63–98.
- Collura, Paolo (1971). "La localizzazione di Hippana alla luce di alcuni documenti medievali" [The location of Hippana in the light of some medieval documents] (PDF). Sicilia Archeologica (in Italian). IV, 15: 38–42.
- Fucarino, Carmelo (2000). Stratigrafia del Comune di Prizzi come metafora della storia dell'isola, Vol. 1, Comune di Prizzi [Stratigraphy of the Municipality of Prizzi as a metaphor for the history of the island, Vol. 1, Municipality of Prizzi] (in Italian).
- Manni, Eugenio (1961). "Hippana, Sittana o Hipana?" [Hippana, Sittana or Hipana?]. Kokalos (in Italian). VII: 122–123.
- Sermenghi, Cesare (1981). Mondi minori scomparsi [Minor worlds disappeared] (in Italian). Palermo: Il Vertice/Libri Editrice.[ISBN unspecified]
- Tusa, Vincenzo (1961). "Il centro abitato su Monte Cavalli è identificabile con Hippana?" [Is the town on Monte Cavalli identifiable with Hippana?]. Kokalos (in Italian). VII: 114–121.
- Varvaro, Alberto (1981). Lingua e storia in Sicilia. Dalle guerre puniche alla conquista normanna [Language and History in Sicily. From the Punic Wars to the Norman Conquest] (in Italian). Palermo: Sellerio editore. [ISBN unspecified].
- Vassallo, Stefano (2015). Montagna dei Cavalli. Guida Breve [Horse Mountain. Short Guide] (PDF) (in Italian). Palermo: Superintendence of Cultural and Environmental Heritage Section for Archaeological Heritage..
- Vassallo, Stefano (1997). "Ricerche a Montagna dei Cavalli. Scavi 1988-1991 a Montagna dei Cavalli - Hippana" [Research at Montagna dei Cavalli. Excavations 1988-1991 at Montagna dei Cavalli - Hippana]. Archeologia e Territorio (in Italian): 275–348.
