= Gnaeus Cornelius Scipio Asina =

Third Century BCE Roman general and statesman, consul in 260 BCE

- Known for: First Punic War
- Father: Lucius Cornelius Scipio Barbatus
- Relatives: Lucius Cornelius Scipio (brother)
- Family: Cornelii Scipiones

Gnaeus Cornelius Scipio Asina (lived during the 3rd century BC) was a Roman general and statesman who fought in the First Punic War.

Scipio Asina belonged to the patrician family of the Cornelii Scipiones. He was the son of Lucius Cornelius Scipio Barbatus and brother of Lucius Cornelius Scipio (consul 259 BC). His son was Publius Cornelius Scipio Asina, consul in 221 BC.

Elected consul for the year 260 BC with Gaius Duillius, Scipio Asina had the honour of commanding the first Roman fleet launched onto the Mediterranean Sea. While patrolling the waters of the Messina strait between Italy and Sicily, Scipio Asina received the information that Lipara, in the Lipari Islands, was about to change to the Roman side. Eager to secure such an important port and to gain glory for himself, he rushed to the islands without considering security. It is unclear if the Carthaginians planned the whole affair, but the Roman fleet was trapped in the harbor by Hannibal Gisco. Without naval warfare experience, the crews panicked and escaped to land, leaving the ships unattended and Scipio Asina to be made prisoner by the Carthaginians. Later, Gnaeus Cornelius was released from captivity, but it is unknown when and under what circumstances this happened. Apparently, the Romans did not see any particular guilt on the part of Scipio Asina in the defeat at Lipari. This is how historiography explains the fact that in 254 BC Gnaeus Cornelius became consul for the second time. Although there was hardly any fighting, the encounter is known as the Battle of the Lipari Islands. His mishap earned him the pejorative surname Asina ("ass", literally "female donkey", in Latin), given by political opponents. Neither the humiliation, nor his loss, ended his career; in 254 BC, Scipio Asina was elected consul for the second time and, with his co-consul Aulus Atilius Caiatinus, succeeded in the conquest of Panormus (Palermo, now capital of Sicily).

== See also ==
- Scipio-Paullus-Gracchus family tree

Political offices
Preceded by Lucius Valerius Flaccus; Titus Otacilius Crassus	Roman consul 260 BC; With: Gaius Duilius	Succeeded by Lucius Cornelius Scipio; Gaius Aquillius Florus
Preceded by Servius Fulvius Paetinus Nobilior; Marcus Aemilius Paullus	Roman consul II; 254 BC; With: Aulus Atilius Caiatinus	Succeeded by Gnaeus Servilius Caepio; Gaius Sempronius Blaesus
