= Gaius Sulpicius Paterculus =

3rd century BC Roman general and statesman, consul in 358 BC

Gaius Sulpicius Paterculus served as a consul of the Roman Republic in 258 BC, together with Aulus Atilius Calatinus. He succeeded Lucius Cornelius Scipio, who was the second consul of 259.

== Punic War ==
During the First Punic War Gaius Sulpicius Paterculus served as a commander in Sicily. The Roman victory at Sulci is credited to him. An account of his campaign stated that the Roman legions in Sicily were achieving very little until his arrival together with the Calatinus. The consuls advanced towards the Carthaginian army in its winter quarters in Panormus and deployed the entire Roman army close to the city. The enemy refused to fight so the Romans turned towards the town of Hippana, Myttistratum, Camarina, Enna and other Carthaginian strongholds, which they all captured.

Gaius Sulpicius Paterculus also led several successful attacks on the African coast. He was awarded a Roman triumph "over the Carthaginians and Sardinia".

== See also ==
- Sulpicia (gens)

Political offices
| Preceded by Lucius Cornelius Scipio; Gaius Aquillius Florus | Consul of the Roman Republic; 258 BC; With: Aulus Atilius Calatinus | Succeeded by Gaius Atilius Regulus; Gaius Sempronius Blaesus |
