= Battle of Sulci =

258 BC defeat for the Carthaginian navy

- Part of the First Punic War
Date	258 BC
Location	near Sulci, Sardinia 39.0667°N 8.4500°E
Result	Roman victory

Belligerents
Roman Republic	Carthage

Commanders and leaders
Gaius Sulpicius Paterculus	Hannibal Gisco (executed)

The Battle of Sulci was a naval battle fought in 258 BC between the Roman and Carthaginian navies on the coast near the town of Sulci, Sardinia. It was a Roman victory, obtained by consul Gaius Sulpicius Paterculus. The Carthaginian fleet was largely sunk, and the rest of the ships were abandoned on land. The Carthaginian commander Hannibal Gisco was crucified or stoned to death by his mutinying army.

The Romans were subsequently defeated by a certain Hanno in Sardinia, and the Roman attempt to capture the island failed. The loss of ships prevented the Carthaginians from mounting major operations from Sardinia against the Romans.

== Bibliography ==
- Lazenby, John Francis (1996). The First Punic War: A Military History. Stanford, California: Stanford University Press. ISBN 0-8047-2673-6. OCLC 34371250.
- Rankov, Boris (2011). "A War of Phases: Strategies and Stalemates 264–241". In Hoyos, Dexter (ed.). A Companion to the Punic Wars. Oxford: Wiley-Blackwell. ISBN 978-1-405-17600-2.
