= First Punic War =

War between Rome and Carthage (264–241 BC)

- Part of the Punic Wars
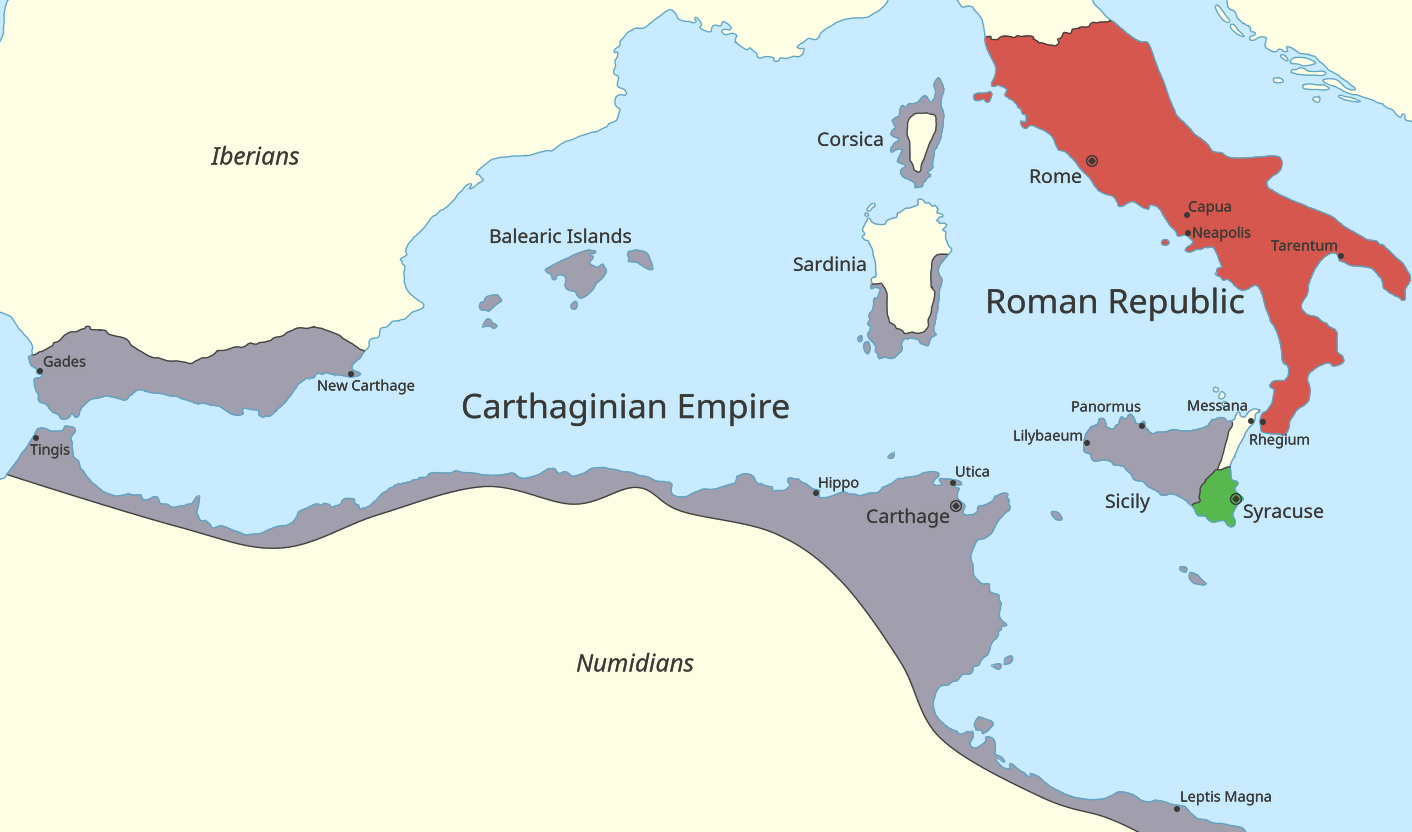
- The Western Mediterranean just before the start of the war in 264 BC: Rome is shown in red, Carthage in grey, and Syracuse in green
Date	264–241 BC (23 years)
Location	Mediterranean Sea, Sicily, North Africa, Italy, Corsica, Sardinia
Result	Roman victory
Territorial changes	Roman annexation of Sicily (except Syracuse)

Belligerents
Rome	Carthage

The First Punic War (264–241 BC) was the first of three wars fought between Rome and Carthage, the two main powers of the western Mediterranean in the early 3rd century BC. For 23 years, in the longest continuous conflict and greatest naval war of antiquity, the two powers struggled for supremacy. The war was fought primarily on the Mediterranean island of Sicily and its surrounding waters, and also in North Africa. After immense losses on both sides, the Carthaginians were defeated and Rome gained territory from Carthage.

The war began in 264 BC with the Romans gaining a foothold on Sicily at Messana (modern Messina). The Romans then pressed Syracuse, the only significant independent power on the island, into allying with them and laid siege to Carthage's main base at Akragas. A large Carthaginian army attempted to lift the siege in 262 BC but was heavily defeated at the Battle of Akragas. The Romans then built a navy to challenge the Carthaginians, and using novel tactics inflicted several defeats. A Carthaginian base on Corsica was seized, but an attack on Sardinia was repulsed; the base on Corsica was then lost. Taking advantage of their naval victories the Romans launched an invasion of North Africa, which the Carthaginians intercepted. At the Battle of Cape Ecnomus the Carthaginians were again beaten; this was possibly the largest naval battle in history by the number of combatants involved. The invasion initially went well and in 255 BC the Carthaginians sued for peace; the proposed terms were so harsh that they fought on, defeating the invaders. The Romans sent a fleet to evacuate their survivors and the Carthaginians opposed it at the Battle of Cape Hermaeum off Africa; the Carthaginians were heavily defeated. The Roman fleet, in turn, was devastated by a storm while returning to Italy, losing most of its ships and over 100,000 men.

The war continued, with neither side able to gain a decisive advantage. The Carthaginians attacked and recaptured Akragas in 255 BC but, not believing they could hold the city, they razed and abandoned it. The Romans rapidly rebuilt their fleet, adding 220 new ships, and captured Panormus (modern Palermo) in 254 BC. The next year they lost 150 ships to a storm. In 251 BC the Carthaginians attempted to recapture Panormus, but were defeated in a battle outside the walls. Slowly the Romans had occupied most of Sicily; in 249 BC they besieged the last two Carthaginian strongholds – in the extreme west. They also launched a surprise attack on the Carthaginian fleet but were defeated at the Battle of Drepana. The Carthaginians followed up their victory and most of the remaining Roman warships were lost at the Battle of Phintias. After several years of stalemate, the Romans rebuilt their fleet again in 243 BC and effectively blockaded the Carthaginian garrisons. Carthage assembled a fleet that attempted to relieve them, but it was destroyed at the Battle of the Aegates Islands in 241 BC, forcing the cut-off Carthaginian troops on Sicily to negotiate for peace.

A treaty was agreed. By its terms Carthage paid large reparations and Sicily was annexed as a Roman province. Henceforth Rome was the leading military power in the western Mediterranean, and increasingly the Mediterranean region as a whole. The immense effort of building 1,000 galleys during the war laid the foundation for Rome's maritime dominance for 600 years. The end of the war sparked a major but unsuccessful revolt within the Carthaginian Empire. The unresolved strategic competition between Rome and Carthage led to the eruption of the Second Punic War in 218 BC.

== Primary sources ==
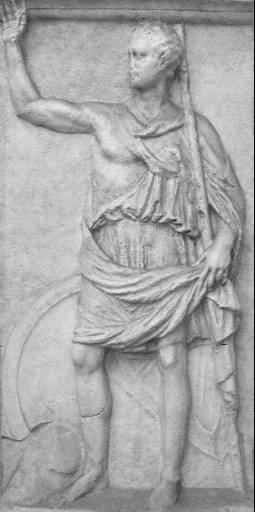
Polybius, ancient Greek historian

The term Punic comes from the Latin word Punicus (or Poenicus), meaning "Phoenician", and is a reference to the Carthaginians' Phoenician ancestry. The main source for almost every aspect of the First Punic War is the historian Polybius (c. 200 – c. 118 BC), a Greek sent to Rome in 167 BC as a hostage. His works include a now-lost manual on military tactics, but he is known today for The Histories, written sometime after 146 BC or about a century after the end of the war. Polybius's work is considered broadly objective and largely neutral as between Carthaginian and Roman points of view.

Carthaginian written records were destroyed along with their capital, Carthage, in 146 BC and so Polybius's account of the First Punic War is based on several, now-lost, Greek and Latin sources. Polybius was an analytical historian and wherever possible personally interviewed participants in the events he wrote about. Only the first book of the 40 comprising The Histories deals with the First Punic War. The accuracy of Polybius's account has been much debated over the past 150 years, but the modern consensus is to accept it largely at face value, and the details of the war in modern sources are almost entirely based on interpretations of Polybius's account. The modern historian Andrew Curry considers that "Polybius turns out to [be] fairly reliable"; while Craige B. Champion describes him as "a remarkably well-informed, industrious, and insightful historian". Other, later, histories of the war exist, but in fragmentary or summary form. Modern historians usually take into account the fragmentary writings of various Roman annalists, especially Livy (who relied on Polybius), the Sicilian Greek Diodorus Siculus, and the later Greek writers Appian and Cassius Dio. The classicist Adrian Goldsworthy states that "Polybius' account is usually to be preferred when it differs with any of our other accounts". (Note: Sources other than Polybius are discussed by Bernard Mineo in "Principal Literary Sources for the Punic Wars (apart from Polybius)".) Other sources include inscriptions, terrestrial archaeological evidence, and empirical evidence from reconstructions such as the trireme Olympias.

Since 2010, 19 bronze warship rams have been found by archaeologists in the sea off the west coast of Sicily, a mix of Roman and Carthaginian. Ten bronze helmets and hundreds of amphorae have also been found. The rams, seven of the helmets, and six intact amphorae, along with a large number of fragments, have since been recovered. It is believed the rams were each attached to a sunken warship when they were deposited on the seabed. The archaeologists involved stated that the location of artefacts so far discovered supports Polybius's account of where the Battle of the Aegates Islands took place. Based on the dimensions of the recovered rams, the archaeologists who have studied them believe they all came from triremes, contrary to Polybius's account that all the warships involved were quinqueremes. However, they believe that the many amphorae identified confirm the accuracy of other aspects of Polybius's account of this battle: "It is the sought-after convergence of the archaeological and historical records."

== Background ==
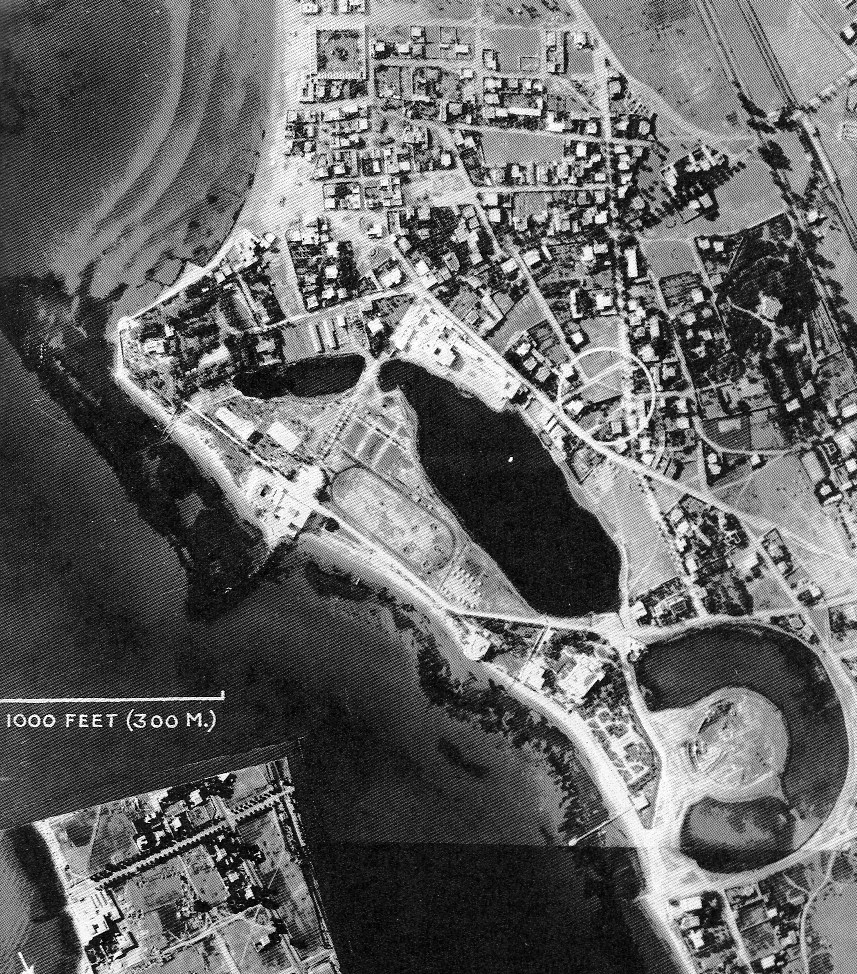
An aerial photograph of the remains of the naval base of the city of Carthage. The remains of the mercantile harbour are in the centre and those of the military harbour are bottom right. Before the war Carthage had the most powerful navy in the western Mediterranean.

The Roman Republic had been aggressively expanding in the southern Italian mainland for a century before the First Punic War. It had conquered peninsular Italy south of the River Arno by 272 BC when the Greek cities of southern Italy (Magna Graecia) submitted at the conclusion of the Pyrrhic War. During this period Carthage, with its capital in what is now Tunisia, had come to dominate southern Spain, much of the coastal regions of North Africa, the Balearic Islands, Corsica, Sardinia, and the western half of Sicily, in a military and commercial empire. Beginning in 480 BC Carthage had fought a series of inconclusive wars against the Greek city states of Sicily, led by Syracuse. By 264 BC Carthage and Rome were the preeminent powers in the western Mediterranean. The two states had several times asserted their mutual friendship via formal alliances: in 509 BC, 348 BC and around 279 BC. Relationships were good, with strong commercial links. During the Pyrrhic War of 280–275 BC, against a king of Epirus who alternately fought Rome in Italy and Carthage on Sicily, Carthage provided materiel to the Romans and on at least one occasion used its navy to ferry a Roman force.

In 289 BC a group of Italian mercenaries known as Mamertines, previously hired by Syracuse, occupied the city of Messana (modern Messina) on the north-eastern tip of Sicily. Hard-pressed by Syracuse, the Mamertines appealed to both Rome and Carthage for assistance in 265 BC. The Carthaginians acted first, pressing Hiero II, king of Syracuse, into taking no further action and convincing the Mamertines to accept a Carthaginian garrison. According to Polybius, a considerable debate then took place in Rome as to whether to accept the Mamertines' appeal for assistance. As the Carthaginians had already garrisoned Messana, acceptance could easily lead to war with Carthage. The Romans had not previously displayed any interest in Sicily and did not wish to come to the aid of soldiers who had unjustly stolen a city from its rightful owners. However, many of them saw strategic and monetary advantages in gaining a foothold in Sicily. The deadlocked Roman Senate, possibly at the instigation of Appius Claudius Caudex, put the matter before the popular assembly in 264 BC. Caudex encouraged a vote for action and held out the prospect of plentiful booty; the popular assembly decided to accept the Mamertines' request. Caudex was appointed commander of a military expedition with orders to cross to Sicily and place a Roman garrison in Messana.

The war began with the Romans landing on Sicily in 264 BC. Despite the Carthaginian naval advantage, the Roman crossing of the Strait of Messina was ineffectively opposed. Two legions commanded by Caudex marched to Messana, where the Mamertines had expelled the Carthaginian garrison commanded by Hanno (no relation to Hanno the Great) and were besieged by both the Carthaginians and the Syracusans. The sources are unclear as to why, but first the Syracusans, and then the Carthaginians withdrew from the siege. The Romans marched south and in turn besieged Syracuse, but they had neither a strong enough force nor the secure supply lines to prosecute a successful siege, and soon withdrew. The Carthaginians' experience over the previous two centuries of warfare on Sicily was that decisive action was impossible; military efforts petered out after heavy losses and huge expense. The Carthaginian leaders expected that this war would run a similar course. Meanwhile, their overwhelming maritime superiority would allow the war to be kept at a distance, and even for them to continue to prosper. This would allow them to recruit and pay an army that would operate in the open against the Romans, while their strongly fortified cities could be supplied by sea and provide a defensive base from which to operate.

=== Armies ===
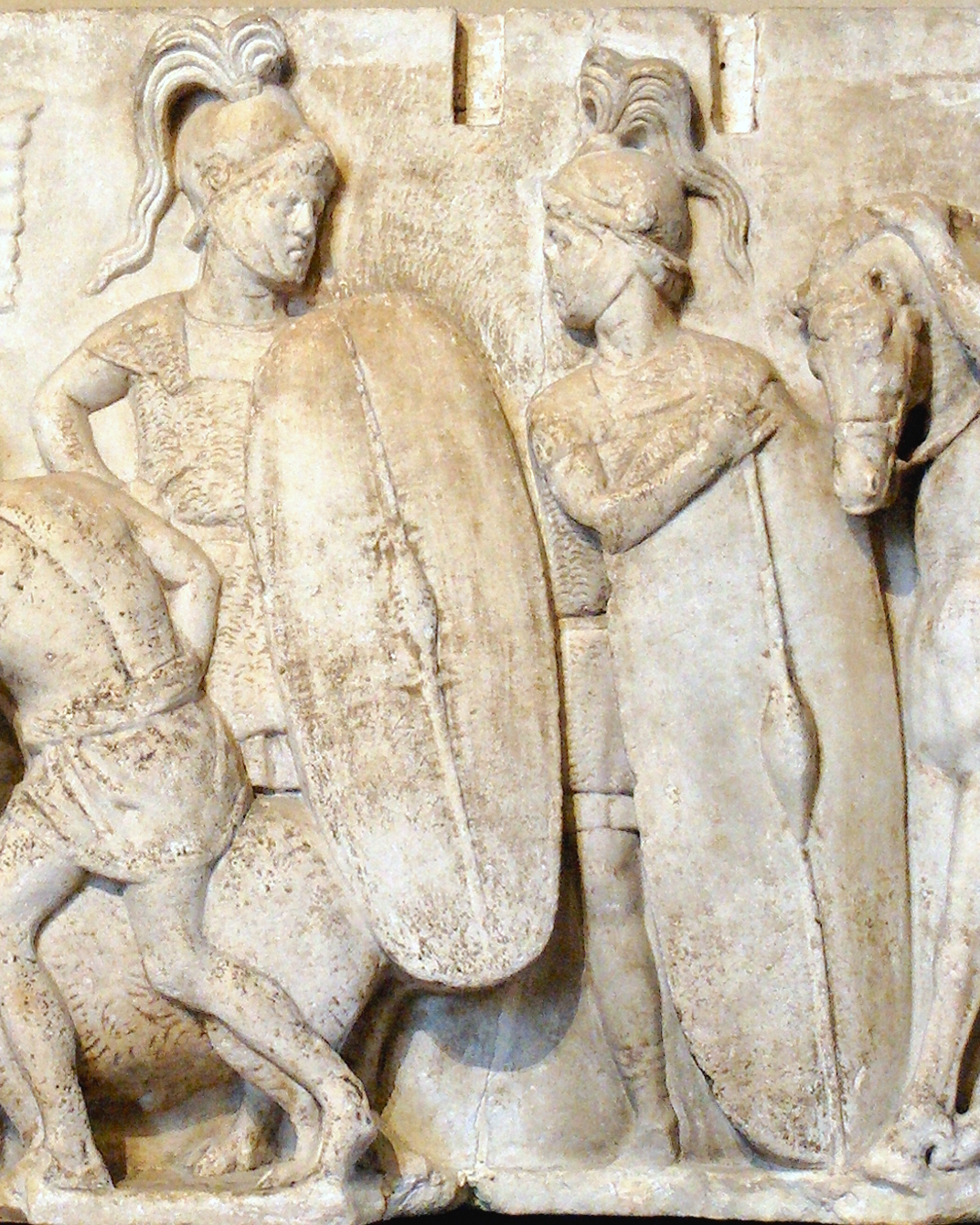
Detail from the Ahenobarbus relief showing two Roman foot-soldiers from the second century BC

Adult male Roman citizens were liable for military service; most would serve as infantry with the wealthier minority providing a cavalry component. Traditionally the Romans would raise two legions, each of 4,200 infantry (Note: This could be increased to 5,000 in some circumstances.) and 300 cavalry. A small number of the infantry served as javelin-armed skirmishers. The balance were equipped as heavy infantry, with body armour, a large shield, and short thrusting swords. They were divided into three ranks, of which the front rank also carried two javelins, while the second and third ranks had a thrusting spear instead. Both legionary sub-units and individual legionaries fought in relatively open order. An army was usually formed by combining a Roman legion with a similarly sized and equipped legion provided by their Latin allies.

Carthaginian citizens served in their army only if there was a direct threat to the city. In most circumstances Carthage recruited foreigners to make up its army. Many would be from North Africa which provided several types of fighters including: close-order infantry equipped with large shields, helmets, short swords and long thrusting spears; javelin-armed light infantry skirmishers; close-order shock cavalry (Note: "Shock" troops are those trained and used to close rapidly with an opponent, with the intention of breaking them before or immediately upon contact.) (also known as "heavy cavalry") carrying spears; and light cavalry skirmishers who threw javelins from a distance and avoided close combat. Both Spain and Gaul provided experienced infantry; unarmoured troops who would charge ferociously, but had a reputation for breaking off if a combat was protracted. (Note: The Spanish used a heavy throwing spear which the Romans were later to adopt as the pilum.) Most of the Carthaginian infantry would fight in a tightly packed formation known as a phalanx, usually forming two or three lines. Specialist slingers were recruited from the Balearic Islands. The Carthaginians also employed war elephants; North Africa had indigenous African forest elephants at the time. (Note: These elephants were typically about 2.5-metre-high (8 ft) at the shoulder, and should not be confused with the larger African bush elephant.) The sources are not clear as to whether they carried towers containing fighting men.

=== Navies ===
Quinqueremes, meaning "five-oared", provided the workhorse of the Roman and Carthaginian fleets throughout the Punic Wars. So ubiquitous was the type that Polybius uses it as a shorthand for "warship" in general. A quinquereme carried a crew of 300: 280 oarsmen and 20 deck crew and officers. It would also normally carry a complement of 40 marines – usually soldiers assigned to the ship – if battle was thought to be imminent this would be increased to as many as 120.

The corvus, the Roman ship boarding device

Getting the oarsmen to row as a unit, let alone to execute more complex battle manoeuvres, required long and arduous training. At least half of the oarsmen would need to have had some experience if the ship was to be handled effectively. As a result, the Romans were initially at a disadvantage against the more experienced Carthaginians. To counter this, the Romans introduced the corvus, a bridge 1.2 metres (4 feet) wide and 11 metres (36 feet) long, with a heavy spike on the underside of the free end, which was designed to pierce and anchor into an enemy ship's deck. This allowed Roman legionaries acting as marines to board enemy ships and capture them, rather than employing the previously traditional tactic of ramming.

All warships were equipped with rams, a triple set of 60-centimetre-wide (2 ft) bronze blades weighing up to 270 kilograms (600 lb) positioned at the waterline. In the century prior to the Punic Wars, boarding had become increasingly common and ramming had declined, as the larger and heavier vessels adopted in this period lacked the speed and manoeuvrability necessary to ram, while their sturdier construction reduced the ram's effect even in case of a successful attack. The Roman adaptation of the corvus was a continuation of this trend and compensated for their initial disadvantage in ship-manoeuvring skills. The added weight in the prow compromised both the ship's manoeuvrability and its seaworthiness, and in rough sea conditions the corvus became useless.

== Sicily 264–256 BC ==
Sicily, the main theatre of the war

Much of the war was to be fought on, or in the waters near, Sicily. Away from the coasts, its hilly and rugged terrain made manoeuvring large forces difficult and favoured defence over offence. Land operations were largely confined to raids, sieges, and interdiction; in 23 years of war on Sicily there were only two full-scale pitched battles – Akragas in 262 BC and Panormus in 250 BC. Garrison duty and land blockades were the most common operations for both armies.

It was the long-standing Roman procedure to appoint two men each year, known as consuls, to each lead an army. In 263 BC both consuls were sent to Sicily with a force of 40,000. Syracuse was again besieged, and with no Carthaginian assistance anticipated, Syracuse rapidly made peace with the Romans: it became a Roman ally, paid an indemnity of 100 talents of silver (Note: 100 talents was approximately 2,600 kilograms (2.6 long tons) of silver.) and, perhaps most importantly, agreed to help supply the Roman army in Sicily. Following the defection of Syracuse, several small Carthaginian dependencies switched to the Romans. Akragas (Latin: Agrigentum; modern Agrigento), a port city halfway along the south coast of Sicily, was chosen by the Carthaginians as their strategic centre. The Romans marched on it in 262 BC and besieged it. The Romans had an inadequate supply system, partly because the Carthaginian naval supremacy prevented them from shipping supplies by sea, and they were not in any case accustomed to feeding an army as large as 40,000 men. At harvest time most of the army was dispersed over a wide area to harvest the crops and to forage. The Carthaginians, commanded by Hannibal Gisco, sortied in force, taking the Romans by surprise and penetrating their camp; the Romans rallied and routed the Carthaginians; after this experience both sides were more guarded.

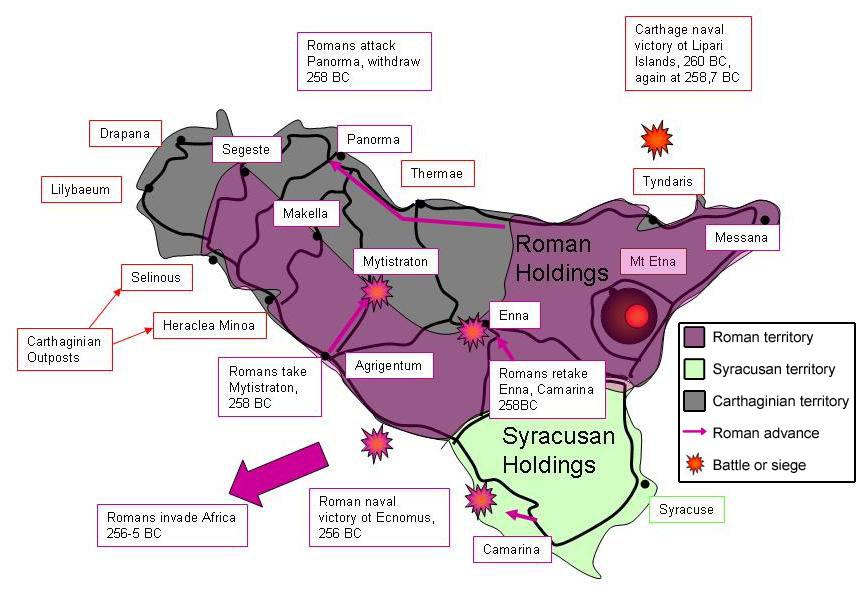
Continued Roman advance 260–256 BC

Meanwhile, Carthage had recruited an army, which assembled in Africa and was shipped to Sicily. It was composed of 50,000 infantry, 6,000 cavalry and 60 elephants, and was commanded by Hanno, son of Hannibal; it was partly made up of Ligurians, Celts and Iberians. Five months after the siege began, Hanno marched to Akragas's relief. When he arrived, he merely camped on high ground, engaged in desultory skirmishing and trained his army. Two months later, in spring 261 BC, he attacked. The Carthaginians were defeated with heavy losses at the Battle of Akragas. The Romans, under both consuls – Lucius Postumius Megellus and Quintus Mamilius Vitulus – pursued, capturing the Carthaginians' elephants and baggage train. That night the Carthaginian garrison escaped while the Romans were distracted. The next day the Romans seized the city and its inhabitants, selling 25,000 of them into slavery.

After this success for the Romans, the war became fragmented for several years, with minor successes for each side, but no clear focus. In part this was because the Romans diverted many of their resources to an ultimately fruitless campaign against Corsica and Sardinia, and then into the equally fruitless expedition to Africa. After taking Akragas the Romans advanced westward to besiege Mytistraton for seven months, without success. In 259 BC they advanced toward Thermae on the north coast. After a quarrel, the Roman troops and their allies set up separate camps. Hamilcar took advantage of this to launch a counter-attack, taking one of the contingents by surprise as it was breaking camp and killing 4,000–6,000. Hamilcar went on to seize Enna, in central Sicily, and Camarina, in the south east, dangerously close to Syracuse. Hamilcar seemed close to overrunning the whole of Sicily. The following year the Romans retook Enna and finally captured Mytistraton. They then moved on Panormus (modern Palermo), but had to withdraw, although they did capture Hippana. In 258 BC they recaptured Camarina after a lengthy siege. For the next few years petty raiding, skirmishing and the occasional defection of a smaller town from one side to the other continued on Sicily.

== Rome builds a fleet ==
Depiction of the position of the rowers of the three different oars in a Greek trireme

The war in Sicily reached a stalemate, as the Carthaginians focused on defending their well-fortified towns and cities; these were mostly on the coast and so could be supplied and reinforced without the Romans being able to use their superior army to interdict. The focus of the war shifted to the sea, where the Romans had little experience; on the few occasions they had previously felt the need for a naval presence they had usually relied on small squadrons provided by their Latin or Greek allies. In 260 BC Romans set out to construct a fleet and used a shipwrecked Carthaginian quinquereme as a blueprint for their own. As novice shipwrights, the Romans built copies that were heavier than the Carthaginian vessels, making them much slower and less maneuvrable.

The Romans built 120 warships and despatched them to Sicily in 260 BC for their crews to carry out basic training. One of the consuls for the year, Gnaeus Cornelius Scipio, sailed with the first 17 ships to arrive to the Lipari Islands, a little way off the north-east coast of Sicily, in an attempt to seize the islands' main port, Lipara. The Carthaginian fleet was commanded by Hannibal Gisco, the general who had commanded the garrison of Akragas, and was based at Panormus, some 100 kilometres (62 miles) from Lipara. When Hannibal heard of the Romans' move he despatched 20 ships under Boodes to the town. The Carthaginians arrived at night and trapped the Romans in the harbour. Boodes' ships attacked and Scipio's inexperienced men offered little resistance. Some Romans panicked and fled inland and the consul himself was taken prisoner. All of the Roman ships were captured, most with little damage. A little later, Hannibal was scouting with 50 Carthaginian ships when he encountered the full Roman fleet. He escaped, but lost most of his ships. It was after this skirmish that the Romans installed the corvus on their ships.

Scipio's fellow consul, Gaius Duilius, placed the Roman army units under subordinates and took command of the fleet. He promptly sailed, seeking battle. The two fleets met off the coast of Mylae in the Battle of Mylae. Hannibal had 130 ships, and the historian John Lazenby calculates that Duilius had approximately the same number. The Carthaginians anticipated victory, due to the superior experience of their crews, and their faster and more manoeuvrable galleys, and broke formation to close rapidly with the Romans. The first 30 Carthaginian ships were grappled by the corvus and successfully boarded by the Romans, including Hannibal's ship – he escaped in a skiff. Seeing this, the remaining Carthaginians swung wide, attempting to take the Romans in the sides or rear. The Romans successfully countered and captured a further 20 Carthaginian vessels. (Note: The figures for Carthaginian losses are taken from Polybius. Other ancient sources give 30 or 31 ships captured and 13 or 14 sunk.) The surviving Carthaginians broke off the action, and being faster than the Romans were able to escape. Duilius sailed to relieve the Roman-held city of Segesta, which had been under siege.

From early 262 BC Carthaginian ships had been raiding the Italian coast from bases on Sardinia and Corsica. The year after Mylae, 259 BC, the consul Lucius Cornelius Scipio led part of the fleet against Aléria in Corsica and captured it. He then attacked Ulbia on Sardinia, but was repulsed, and also lost Aléria. In 258 BC a stronger Roman fleet engaged a smaller Carthaginian fleet at the Battle of Sulci off the city of Sulci, in western Sardinia, and inflicted a heavy defeat. The Carthaginian commander Hannibal Gisco, who abandoned his men and fled to Sulci, was later captured by his soldiers and crucified. Despite this victory, the Romans – who were attempting to support simultaneous offensives against both Sardinia and Sicily – were unable to exploit it, and the attack on Carthaginian-held Sardinia petered out.

In 257 BC the Roman fleet happened to be anchored off Tyndaris in north-east Sicily when the Carthaginian fleet, unaware of its presence, sailed past in loose formation. The Roman commander, Gaius Atilius Regulus, ordered an immediate attack, initiating the Battle of Tyndaris. This led to the Roman fleet in turn putting to sea in a disordered manner. The Carthaginians responded rapidly, ramming and sinking nine of the leading ten Roman ships. As the main Roman force came into action they sank eight Carthaginian ships and captured ten. The Carthaginians withdrew, again being faster than the Romans and so able to make off without further loss. The Romans then raided both the Liparis and Malta.

== Invasion of Africa ==
1: Romans land and capture Aspis (256 BC) 2: Roman victory at Adys (256 BC) 3: Romans capture Tunis (256 BC) 4: Xanthippus sets out from Carthage with a large army (255 BC) 5: Romans are defeated at the Battle of Tunis. (255 BC) 6: Romans retreat to Aspis and leave Africa. (254 BC)

Rome's naval victories at Mylae and Sulci, and their frustration at the stalemate in Sicily, led them to adopt a sea-based strategy and to develop a plan to invade the Carthaginian heartland in North Africa and threaten Carthage (close to Tunis). Both sides were determined to establish naval supremacy and invested large amounts of money and manpower in maintaining and increasing the size of their navies. The Roman fleet of 330 warships and an unknown number of transports sailed from Ostia, the port of Rome, in early 256 BC, commanded by the consuls for the year, Marcus Atilius Regulus and Lucius Manlius Vulso Longus. The Romans embarked approximately 26,000 legionaries from the Roman forces on Sicily shortly before the battle. They planned to cross to Africa and invade what is now Tunisia.

The Carthaginians knew of the Romans' intentions and mustered all their 350 warships under Hanno the Great and Hamilcar, off the south coast of Sicily to intercept them. With a combined total of about 680 warships carrying up to 290,000 crew and marines, the ensuing Battle of Cape Ecnomus was possibly the largest naval battle in history by the number of combatants involved. At the start of the battle the Carthaginians took the initiative, hoping their superior ship handling skills would tell. After a day of prolonged and confused fighting the Carthaginians were defeated, losing 30 ships sunk and 64 captured to Roman losses of 24 ships sunk.

After the victory the Roman army, commanded by Regulus, landed in Africa near Aspis (modern Kelibia) on the Cape Bon Peninsula and began ravaging the Carthaginian countryside. After a brief siege, Aspis was captured. Most of the Roman ships returned to Sicily, leaving Regulus with 15,000 infantry and 500 cavalry to continue the war in Africa; Regulus laid siege to the city of Adys. The Carthaginians had recalled Hamilcar from Sicily with 5,000 infantry and 500 cavalry. Hamilcar, Hasdrubal and a third general called Bostar were placed in joint command of an army which was strong in cavalry and elephants and was approximately the same size as the Roman force. The Carthaginians established a camp on a hill near Adys. The Romans carried out a night march and launched a surprise dawn attack on the camp from two directions. After confused fighting the Carthaginians broke and fled. Their losses are unknown, although their elephants and cavalry escaped with few casualties.

The Romans followed up and captured Tunis, only 16 km (10 mi) from Carthage. From Tunis the Romans raided and devastated the immediate area around Carthage. In despair, the Carthaginians sued for peace but Regulus offered such harsh terms that the Carthaginians decided to fight on. Charge of the training of their army was given to the Spartan mercenary commander Xanthippus. In 255 BC Xanthippus led an army of 12,000 infantry, 4,000 cavalry and 100 elephants against the Romans and defeated them at the Battle of Tunis. Approximately 2,000 Romans retreated to Aspis; 500, including Regulus, were captured; the rest were killed. Xanthippus, fearful of the envy of the Carthaginian generals he had outdone, took his pay and returned to Greece. The Romans sent a fleet to evacuate their survivors. It was intercepted by a Carthaginian fleet off Cape Bon (in the north east of modern Tunisia) and in the Battle of Cape Hermaeum the Carthaginians were heavily defeated, losing 114 ships captured. (Note: This assumes, per G. K. Tipps, that all 114 captured Carthaginian vessels were sailing with the Romans.) The Roman fleet was devastated by a storm while returning to Italy, with 384 ships sunk from their total of 464 and 100,000 men lost, the majority non-Roman Latin allies. It is possible that the presence of the corvus made the Roman ships unusually unseaworthy; there is no record of them being used after this disaster.

== Sicily 255–248 BC ==
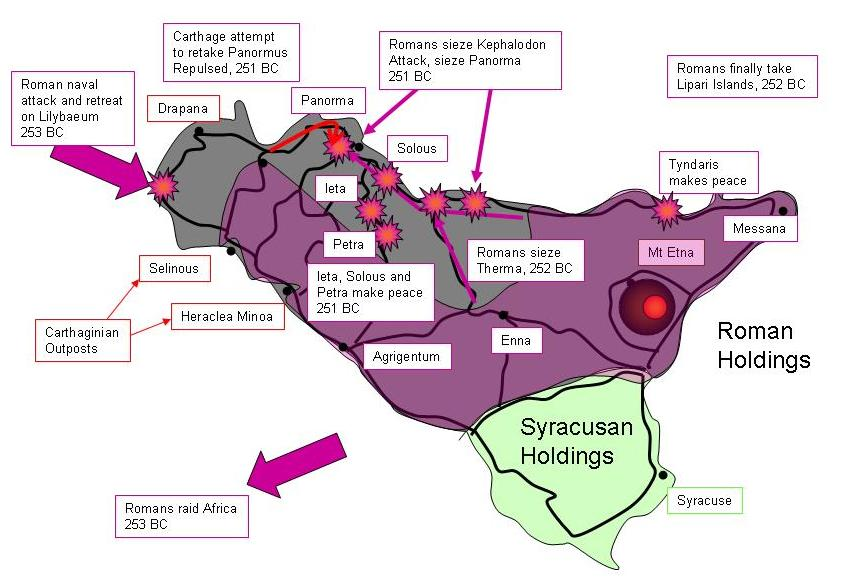
Roman attacks 253–251 BC

Having lost most of their fleet in the storm of 255 BC, the Romans rapidly rebuilt it, adding 220 new ships. In 254 BC the Carthaginians attacked and captured Akragas, but not believing they could hold the city, they burned it, razed its walls and left. Meanwhile, the Romans launched a determined offensive in Sicily. Their entire fleet, under both consuls, attacked Panormus early in the year. The city was surrounded and blockaded, and siege engines set up. These made a breach in the walls which the Romans stormed, capturing the outer town and giving no quarter. The inner town promptly surrendered. The 14,000 inhabitants who could afford it ransomed themselves and the remaining 13,000 were sold into slavery. Much of western inland Sicily now went over to the Romans: Ietas, Solous, Petra, and Tyndaris all came to terms.

In 253 BC the Romans changed their focus to Africa again and carried out several raids. They lost another 150 ships to a storm while returning from raiding the North African coast east of Carthage. They rebuilt again. The next year the Romans shifted their attention to north-west Sicily. They sent a naval expedition toward Lilybaeum. En route, the Romans seized and burned the Carthaginian hold-out cities of Selinous and Heraclea Minoa, but they failed to take Lilybaeum. In 252 BC they captured Thermae and Lipara, which had been isolated by the fall of Panormus. Otherwise they avoided battle in 252 and 251 BC, according to Polybius because they feared the war elephants which the Carthaginians had shipped to Sicily.

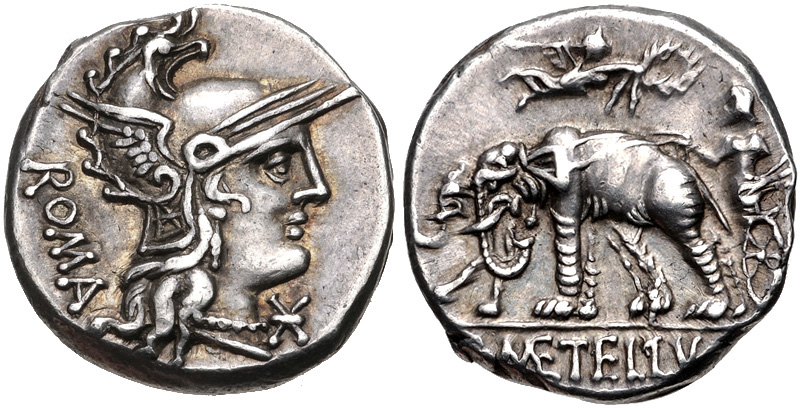
Denarius of C. Caecilius Metellus Caprarius, minted in 125 BC. The reverse depicts the triumph of his ancestor Lucius Caecilius Metellus, with the elephants he had captured at Panormus.

In late summer 251 BC the Carthaginian commander Hasdrubal – who had faced Regulus in Africa – hearing that one consul had left Sicily for the winter with half of the Roman army, advanced on Panormus and devastated the countryside. The Roman army, which had been dispersed to gather the harvest, withdrew into Panormus. Hasdrubal boldly advanced most of his army, including the elephants, towards the city walls. The Roman commander Lucius Caecilius Metellus sent out skirmishers to harass the Carthaginians, keeping them constantly supplied with javelins from the stocks within the city. The ground was covered with earthworks constructed during the Roman siege, making it difficult for the elephants to advance. Peppered with missiles and unable to retaliate, the elephants fled through the Carthaginian infantry behind them. Metellus had opportunistically moved a large force to the Carthaginian's left flank, and they charged into their disordered opponents. The Carthaginians fled; Metellus captured ten elephants but did not permit a pursuit. Contemporary accounts do not report either side's losses, and modern historians consider later claims of 20,000–30,000 Carthaginian casualties improbable.

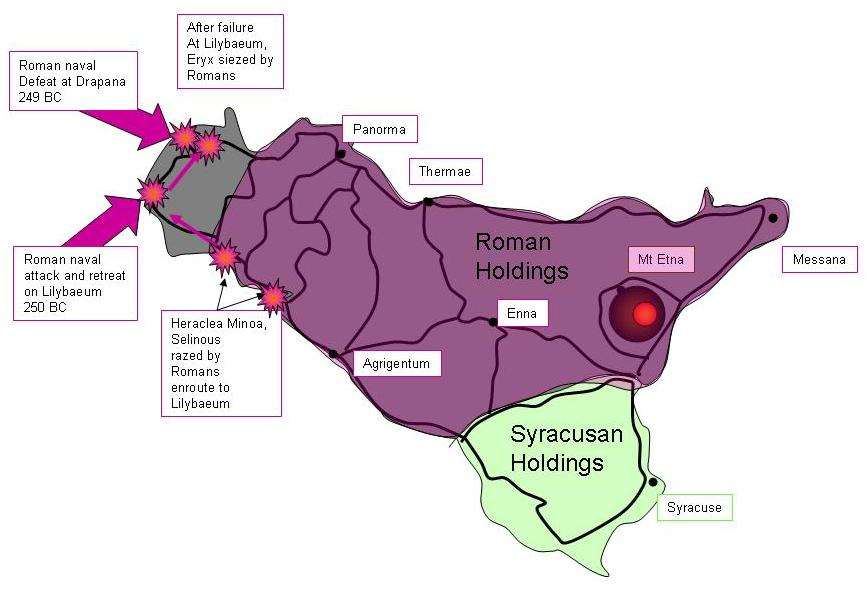
Roman attacks 250–249 BC

Encouraged by their victory at Panormus, the Romans moved against the main Carthaginian base on Sicily, Lilybaeum, in 249 BC. A large army commanded by the year's consuls Publius Claudius Pulcher and Lucius Junius Pullus besieged the city. They had rebuilt their fleet, and 200 ships blockaded the harbour. Early in the blockade, 50 Carthaginian quinqueremes gathered off the Aegates Islands, which lie 15–40 km (9–25 mi) to the west of Sicily. Once there was a strong west wind, they sailed into Lilybaeum before the Romans could react and unloaded reinforcements and a large quantity of supplies. They evaded the Romans by leaving at night, evacuating the Carthaginian cavalry. The Romans sealed off the landward approach to Lilybaeum with earth and timber camps and walls. They made repeated attempts to block the harbour entrance with a heavy timber boom, but due to the prevailing sea conditions they were unsuccessful. The Carthaginian garrison was kept supplied by blockade runners, light and manoeuvrable quinqueremes with highly trained crews and experienced pilots.

Pulcher decided to attack the Carthaginian fleet, which was in the harbour of the nearby city of Drepana (modern Trapani). The Roman fleet sailed by night to carry out a surprise attack, but became scattered in the dark. The Carthaginian commander Adherbal was able to lead his fleet out to sea before they were trapped and counter-attacked in the Battle of Drepana. The Romans were pinned against the shore and after a hard day's fighting were heavily defeated by the more manoeuvrable Carthaginian ships with their better-trained crews. It was Carthage's greatest naval victory of the war. Carthage turned to the maritime offensive, inflicting another heavy naval defeat at the Battle of Phintias and all but swept the Romans from the sea. It was to be seven years before Rome again attempted to field a substantial fleet, while Carthage put most of its ships into reserve to save money and free up manpower.

== Conclusion ==
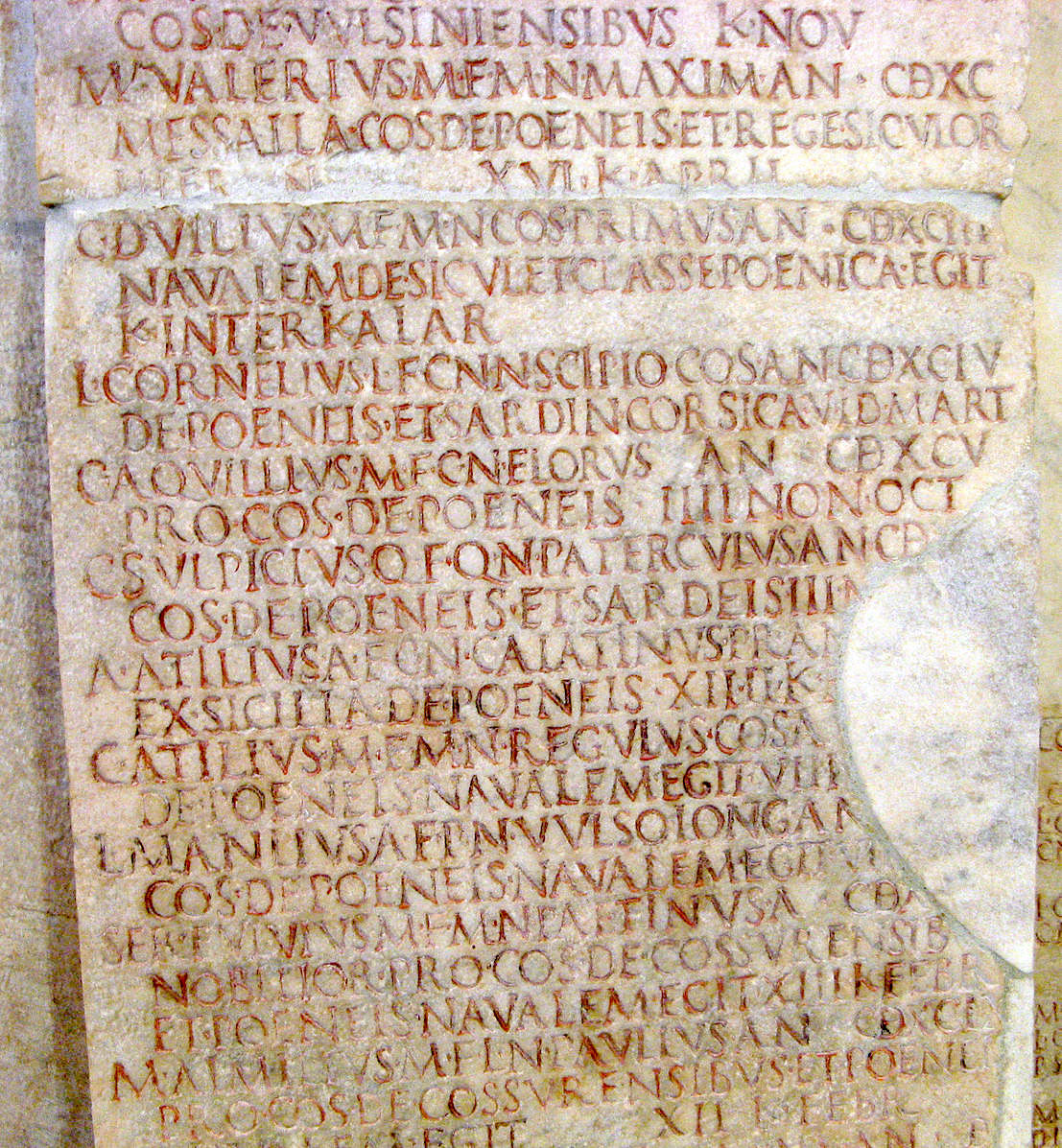
A fragment of the Fasti Triumphales, listing all of the Roman triumphators of the war

By 248 BC the Carthaginians held only two cities on Sicily: Lilybaeum and Drepana; these were well-fortified and situated on the west coast, where they could be supplied and reinforced without the Romans being able to use their superior army to interfere. When Hamilcar Barca (Note: Hamilcar Barca was the father of Hannibal.) took command of the Carthaginians on Sicily in 247 BC he was only given a small army and the Carthaginian fleet was gradually withdrawn. Hostilities between Roman and Carthaginian forces declined to small-scale land operations, which suited the Carthaginian strategy. Hamilcar employed combined arms tactics in a Fabian strategy from his base at Eryx, north of Drepana. This guerrilla warfare kept the Roman legions pinned down and preserved Carthage's foothold in Sicily.

After more than 20 years of war, both states were financially and demographically exhausted. Evidence of Carthage's financial situation includes their request for a 2,000 talent loan (Note: 2,000 talents was approximately 52,000 kilograms (51 long tons) of silver.) from Ptolemaic Egypt, which was refused. Rome was also close to bankruptcy and the number of adult male citizens, who provided the manpower for the navy and the legions, had declined by 17 percent since the start of the war. Goldsworthy describes Roman manpower losses as "appalling".

In late 243 BC, realizing they would not capture Drepana and Lilybaeum unless they could extend their blockade to the sea, the Senate decided to build a new fleet. With the state's coffers exhausted, the Senate approached Rome's wealthiest citizens for loans to finance the construction of one ship each, repayable from the reparations to be imposed on Carthage once the war was won. The result was a fleet of approximately 200 quinqueremes, built, equipped, and crewed without government expense. The Romans modelled the ships of their new fleet on a captured blockade runner with especially good qualities. By now, the Romans were experienced at shipbuilding, and with a proven vessel as a model produced high-quality quinqueremes. Importantly, the corvus was abandoned, which improved the ships' speed and handling but forced a change in tactics on the Romans; they would need to be superior sailors, rather than superior soldiers, to beat the Carthaginians.

The Carthaginians raised a larger fleet which they intended to use to run supplies into Sicily. It would then embark much of the Carthaginian army stationed there to use as marines. It was intercepted by the Roman fleet under Gaius Lutatius Catulus and Quintus Valerius Falto, and in the hard-fought Battle of the Aegates Islands the better-trained Romans defeated the undermanned and ill-trained Carthaginian fleet. After achieving this decisive victory, the Romans continued their land operations in Sicily against Lilybaeum and Drepana. The Carthaginian Senate was reluctant to allocate the resources necessary to have another fleet built and manned. Instead, it ordered Hamilcar to negotiate a peace treaty with the Romans, which he left up to his subordinate Gisco. The Treaty of Lutatius was signed and brought the First Punic War to its end: Carthage evacuated Sicily, handed over all prisoners taken during the war, and paid an indemnity of 3,200 talents (Note: 3,200 talents was approximately 82,000 kilograms (81 long tons) of silver.) over ten years.

== Aftermath ==
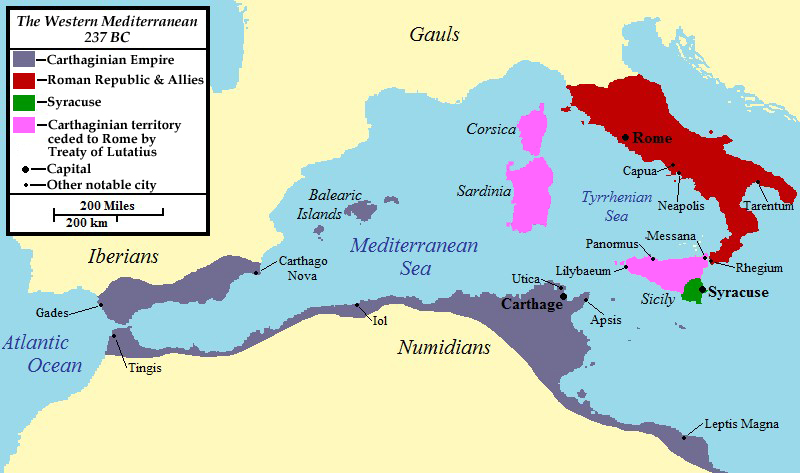
Territory ceded to Rome by Carthage under the treaty is shown in pink.

The war lasted 23 years, the longest war in ancient Romano-Greek history and the greatest naval war of the ancient world. In its aftermath Carthage attempted to avoid paying in full the foreign troops who had fought its war. Eventually they rebelled and were joined by many disgruntled local groups. They were put down with great difficulty and considerable savagery. In 237 BC Carthage prepared an expedition to recover the island of Sardinia, which had been lost to the rebels. Cynically, the Romans stated they considered this an act of war. Their peace terms were the ceding of Sardinia and Corsica and the payment of an additional 1,200-talent indemnity. (Note: 1,200 talents was approximately 30,000 kg (30 long tons) of silver.) Weakened by 30 years of war, Carthage agreed rather than enter into a conflict with Rome again; the additional payment and the renunciation of Sardinia and Corsica were added to the treaty as a codicil. These actions by Rome fuelled resentment in Carthage, which was not reconciled to Rome's perception of its situation, and are considered contributory factors in the outbreak of the Second Punic War.

The leading role of Hamilcar Barca in the defeat of the mutinous foreign troops and African rebels greatly enhanced the prestige and power of the Barcid family. In 237 BC Hamilcar led many of his veterans on an expedition to expand Carthaginian holdings in southern Iberia (modern Spain). Over the following 20 years this was to become a semi-autonomous Barcid fiefdom and the source of much of the silver used to pay the large indemnity owed to Rome.

For Rome, the end of the First Punic War marked the start of its expansion beyond the Italian Peninsula. Sicily became the first Roman province as Sicilia, governed by a former praetor. Sicily would become important to Rome as a source of grain. Sardinia and Corsica, combined, also became a Roman province and a source of grain, under a praetor, although a strong military presence was required for at least the next seven years, as the Romans struggled to suppress the local inhabitants. Syracuse was granted nominal independence and ally status for the lifetime of Hiero II. Henceforth Rome was the leading military power in the western Mediterranean, and increasingly the Mediterranean region as a whole. The Romans had built more than 1,000 galleys during the war, and this experience of building, manning, training, supplying and maintaining such numbers of ships laid the foundation for Rome's maritime dominance for 600 years. The question of which state was to control the western Mediterranean remained open, and when Carthage besieged the Roman-protected town of Saguntum in eastern Iberia in 218 BC it ignited the Second Punic War with Rome.

== Notes, citations and sources ==
=== Sources ===
- Allen, William; Myers, Philip Van Ness (1890). Ancient History for Colleges and High Schools: Part II – A Short History of the Roman People. Boston: Ginn & Company. OCLC 702198714.
- Bagnall, Nigel (1999). The Punic Wars: Rome, Carthage and the Struggle for the Mediterranean. London: Pimlico. ISBN 978-0-7126-6608-4.
- Bringmann, Klaus (2007). A History of the Roman Republic. Cambridge, UK: Polity Press. ISBN 978-0-7456-3370-1.
- Casson, Lionel (1991). The Ancient Mariners (2nd ed.). Princeton, NJ: Princeton University Press. ISBN 978-0-691-06836-7.
- Casson, Lionel (1995). Ships and Seamanship in the Ancient World. Baltimore, MD: Johns Hopkins University Press. ISBN 978-0-8018-5130-8.
- Collins, Roger (1998). Spain: An Oxford Archaeological Guide. Oxford: Oxford University Press. ISBN 978-0-19-285300-4.
- Crawford, Michael (1974). Roman Republican Coinage. Cambridge: Cambridge University Press. OCLC 859598398.
- Curry, Andrew (2012). "The Weapon That Changed History". Archaeology. 65 (1): 32–37. JSTOR 41780760.
- Hoyos, Dexter (2000). "Towards a Chronology of the 'Truceless War', 241–237 B.C.". Rheinisches Museum für Philologie. 143 (3/4): 369–380. JSTOR 41234468.
- Erdkamp, Paul (2015) [2011]. "Manpower and Food Supply in the First and Second Punic Wars". In Hoyos, Dexter (ed.). A Companion to the Punic Wars. Chichester, West Sussex: John Wiley. pp. 58–76. ISBN 978-1-119-02550-4.
- Ghaki, Mansour (2015), "Toponymie et Onomastique Libyques: L'Apport de l'Écriture Punique/Néopunique" (PDF), La Lingua nella Vita e la Vita della Lingua: Itinerari e Percorsi degli Studi Berberi, Studi Africanistici: Quaderni di Studi Berberi e Libico-Berberi (in French), vol. 4, Naples: Unior, pp. 65–71, ISBN 978-88-6719-125-3, ISSN 2283-5636, archived from the original (PDF) on 2020-04-28
- Goldsworthy, Adrian (2006). The Fall of Carthage: The Punic Wars 265–146 BC. London: Phoenix. ISBN 978-0-304-36642-2.
- Harris, William (1979). War and Imperialism in Republican Rome, 327–70 BC. Oxford: Clarendon Press. ISBN 978-0-19-814866-1.
- Hau, Lisa (2016). Moral History from Herodotus to Diodorus Siculus. Edinburgh: Edinburgh University Press. ISBN 978-1-4744-1107-3.
- Head, Barclay; Hill, G.F.; MacDonald, George; Wroth, W. (1911), "Numidia", in Ed Snible (ed.), Historia Numorum (2nd ed.), Oxford: Clarendon Press, pp. 884–887
- Hoyos, Dexter (2015) [2011]. A Companion to the Punic Wars. Chichester, West Sussex: John Wiley. ISBN 978-1-119-02550-4.
- Jones, Archer (1987). The Art of War in the Western World. Urbana: University of Illinois Press. ISBN 978-0-252-01380-5.
- Koon, Sam (2015) [2011]. "Phalanx and Legion: the "Face" of Punic War Battle". In Hoyos, Dexter (ed.). A Companion to the Punic Wars. Chichester, West Sussex: John Wiley. pp. 77–94. ISBN 978-1-119-02550-4.
- Lazenby, John (1996). The First Punic War: A Military History. Stanford, California: Stanford University Press. ISBN 978-0-8047-2673-3.
- Miles, Richard (2011). Carthage Must be Destroyed. London: Penguin. ISBN 978-0-14-101809-6.
- Mineo, Bernard (2015) [2011]. "Principal Literary Sources for the Punic Wars (apart from Polybius)". In Hoyos, Dexter (ed.). A Companion to the Punic Wars. Chichester, West Sussex: John Wiley. pp. 111–128. ISBN 978-1-119-02550-4.
- Murray, William (2011). The Age of Titans: The Rise and Fall of the Great Hellenistic Navies. Oxford: Oxford University Press. ISBN 978-0-19-993240-5.
- Murray, William (2019). "The Ship Classes of the Egadi Rams and Polybius' Account of the First Punic War". Society for Classical Studies.
- Prag, Jonathan (2013). "Rare Bronze Rams Excavated from Site of the Final Battle of the First Punic War". University of Oxford media site. University of Oxford. Archived from the original on 2013-10-01.
- Rankov, Boris (2015) [2011]. "A War of Phases: Strategies and Stalemates". In Hoyos, Dexter (ed.). A Companion to the Punic Wars. Chichester, West Sussex: John Wiley. pp. 149–166. ISBN 978-1-4051-7600-2.
- "Battle of the Egadi Islands Project". RPM Nautical Foundation. 2020.
- Sabin, Philip (1996). "The Mechanics of Battle in the Second Punic War". Bulletin of the Institute of Classical Studies. Supplement. 67 (67): 59–79. JSTOR 43767903.
- Scullard, H.H. (2006) [1989]. "Carthage and Rome". In Walbank, F. W.; Astin, A. E.; Frederiksen, M. W. & Ogilvie, R. M. (eds.). Cambridge Ancient History: Volume 7, Part 2, 2nd Edition. Cambridge: Cambridge University Press. pp. 486–569. ISBN 978-0-521-23446-7.
- Shutt, Rowland (1938). "Polybius: A Sketch". Greece & Rome. 8 (22): 50–57. doi:10.1017/S001738350000588X. JSTOR 642112. S2CID 162905667.
- Sidwell, Keith C.; Jones, Peter V. (1997). The World of Rome: An Introduction to Roman Culture. Cambridge; New York: Cambridge University Press. ISBN 978-0-521-38600-5.
- de Souza, Philip (2008). "Naval Forces". In Sabin, Philip; van Wees, Hans & Whitby, Michael (eds.). The Cambridge History of Greek and Roman Warfare, Volume 1: Greece, the Hellenistic World and the Rise of Rome. Cambridge: Cambridge University Press. pp. 357–367. ISBN 978-0-521-85779-6.
- Starr, Chester (1991) [1965]. A History of the Ancient World. New York, New York: Oxford University Press. ISBN 978-0-19-506628-9.
- Tipps, G.K. (1985). "The Battle of Ecnomus". Historia: Zeitschrift für Alte Geschichte. 34 (4): 432–465. JSTOR 4435938.
- Tusa, Sebastiano; Royal, Jeffrey (2012). "The Landscape of the Naval Battle at the Egadi Islands (241 B.C.)". Journal of Roman Archaeology. 25. Cambridge University Press: 7–48. doi:10.1017/S1047759400001124. ISSN 1047-7594. S2CID 159518193.
- Walbank, Frank (1959). "Naval Triarii". The Classical Review. 64 (1): 10–11. doi:10.1017/S0009840X00092258. JSTOR 702509. S2CID 162463877.
- Walbank, F.W. (1990). Polybius. Vol. 1. Berkeley: University of California Press. ISBN 978-0-520-06981-7.
- Wallinga, Herman (1956). The Boarding-bridge of the Romans: Its Construction and its Function in the Naval Tactics of the First Punic War. Groningen: J.B. Wolters. OCLC 458845955.
- Warmington, Brian (1993) [1960]. Carthage. New York: Barnes & Noble, Inc. ISBN 978-1-56619-210-1.

=== Further reading ===
- Biggs, T. (2017). "Primus Romanorum: Origin Stories, Fictions of Primacy, and the First Punic War". Classical Philology. 112 (3): 350–367. doi:10.1086/692606. ISSN 0009-837X. S2CID 164526422.
- Dexter, Hoyos (1998). Unplanned Wars: The Origins of the First and Second Punic Wars. Berlin and New York: Walter de Gruyter. ISBN 978-3-11-080835-3.
- Polybius (2020) [c. 167–118 BC]. "The Histories". Bill Thayer's Web Site. Translated by Paton, William Roger; Thayer, Bill. University of Chicago.
