= Siege of Lilybaeum (250–241 BC) =

Roman siege of a Carthaginian city during the First Punic War

- Part of the First Punic War
Date	250–241 BC (nine years)
Location	Marsala, Sicily, Italy 37°48′09″N 12°25′48″E
Result	Roman victory

Belligerents
Rome	Carthage

Commanders and leaders
Atilius Regulus Serranus; Manlius Vulso Longus; Claudius Pulcher; Lutatius Catulus	Himilco; Hamilcar Barca; Gisco

Strength
Over 100,000	c. 10,000

Casualties and losses
Heavy	Unknown
- Location within Sicily

The siege of Lilybaeum lasted for nine years, from 250 to 241 BC, as the Roman army laid siege to the Carthaginian-held Sicilian city of Lilybaeum (modern Marsala) during the First Punic War. Rome and Carthage had been at war since 264 BC, fighting mostly on the island of Sicily or in the waters around it, and the Romans were slowly pushing the Carthaginians back. By 250 BC, the Carthaginians held only the cities of Lilybaeum and Drepana; these were well-fortified and situated on the west coast, where they could be supplied and reinforced by sea without the Romans being able to use their superior army to interfere.

In mid-250 BC the Romans besieged Lilybaeum with more than 100,000 men but an attempt to storm Lilybaeum failed and the siege became a stalemate. The Romans then attempted to destroy the Carthaginian fleet but the Roman fleet was destroyed in the naval Battles of Drepana and Phintias; the Carthaginians continued to supply the city from the sea. Nine years later, in 242 BC, the Romans built a new fleet and cut off Carthaginian shipments. The Carthaginians reconstituted their fleet and dispatched it to Sicily loaded with supplies. The Romans met it not far from Lilybaeum and at the Battle of the Aegates in 241 BC the Romans defeated the Carthaginian fleet. The Carthaginians sued for peace and the war ended after 23 years with a Roman victory. The Carthaginians still held Lilybaeum but by the terms of the Treaty of Lutatius, Carthage had to withdraw its forces from Sicily and evacuated the city the same year.

== Primary sources ==
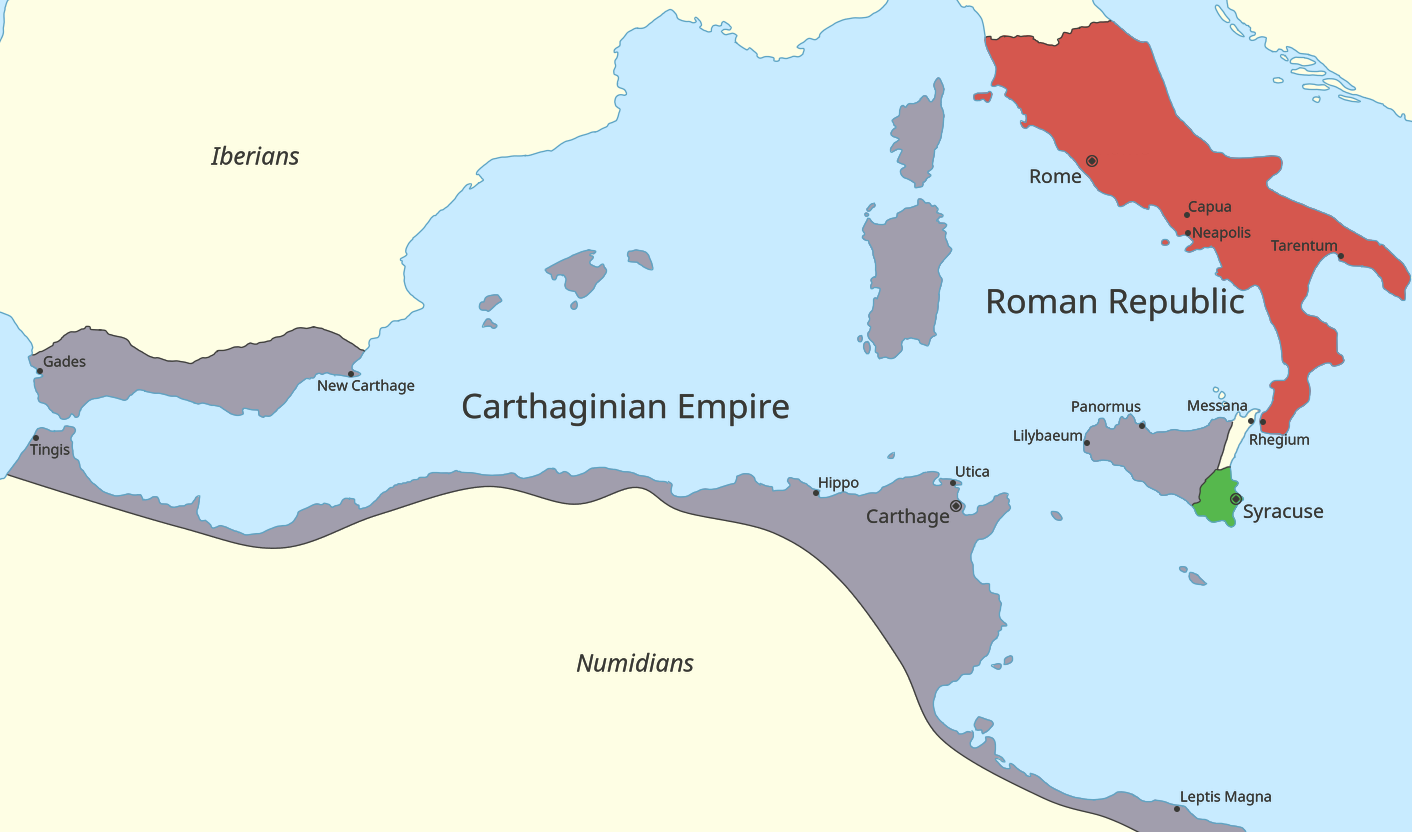
Territory controlled by Rome and Carthage at the start of the First Punic War

The main source for almost every aspect of the First Punic War is the historian Polybius (c. 200 – c.118 BC), a Greek sent to Rome in 167 BC as a hostage. (Note: The term Punic comes from the Latin word Punicus (or Poenicus), meaning "Carthaginian" and is a reference to the Carthaginians' Phoenician ancestry.) His works include a manual on military tactics, not extant, but he is known today for The Histories, written sometime after 146 BC, or about a century after the siege. Polybius's work is considered broadly objective and largely neutral as between Carthaginian and Roman points of view, including as it does the views of earlier, pro-Carthaginian historians such as Philinus of Agrigentum.

Carthaginian written records were destroyed along with their capital, Carthage, in 146 BC. Polybius's account of the First Punic War is based on several lost Greek and Latin sources. Polybius was an analytical historian and wherever possible interviewed participants in the events he wrote about. Only the first book of the forty comprising The Histories deals with the First Punic War. The accuracy of Polybius's account has been much debated over the past 150 years, but the modern consensus is to accept it largely at face value and the details of the battle in modern sources are almost entirely based on interpretations of Polybius's account. The modern historian Andrew Curry considers that "Polybius turns out to [be] fairly reliable" and the classicist Dexter Hoyos describes him as "a remarkably well-informed, industrious, and insightful historian".

Later histories of the war exist in fragmentary or summary form and they usually cover military operations on land in more detail than those at sea. Modern historians usually also take into account the histories of Diodorus Siculus and Dio Cassius, although the classicist Adrian Goldsworthy states that "Polybius' account is usually to be preferred when it differs with any of our other accounts". (Note: Sources other than Polybius are discussed by Bernard Mineo in "Principal Literary Sources for the Punic Wars (apart from Polybius)".) Other sources include coins, inscriptions, archaeological evidence and empirical evidence from reconstructions such as the trireme Olympias. Since 2010, several artefacts have been recovered from the nearby site of the Battle of the Aegates, the final battle of the war. Their analysis and the recovery of further items continue.

== Background ==
Carthage's foothold in western Sicily, 248–241 BC, in gold; Roman-controlled territory in pink; Syracusan in green

In 264 BC the states of Carthage and Rome went to war, starting the First Punic War. The Roman Republic had been aggressively expanding in the southern Italian mainland for a century before the war and had conquered peninsular Italy south of the River Arno by 272 BC. During this period Carthage, with its capital in what is now Tunisia, had come to dominate southern Iberia, much of the coastal regions of North Africa, the Balearic Islands, Corsica, Sardinia, and the western half of Sicily in a military and commercial empire. Rome's expansion into southern Italy probably made it inevitable that it would eventually clash with Carthage over Sicily on some pretext. The immediate cause of the war was the issue of control of the Sicilian town of Messana (modern Messina).

In 260 BC the Romans built a large fleet and over the following ten years defeated the Carthaginians in a succession of naval battles. The Romans also slowly gained control of most of Sicily, including the major cities of Akragas (modern Agrigento; Agrigentum in Latin; captured in 262 BC) and Panormus (modern Palermo; captured in 254 BC). By 250 BC the war had lasted 14 years, fortunes changing many times. It had developed into a struggle in which the Romans were attempting to defeat the Carthaginians decisively and, at a minimum, control the whole of Sicily. The Carthaginians were engaging in their traditional policy of waiting for their opponents to wear themselves out, in the expectation of then regaining some or all of their possessions and negotiating a mutually satisfactory peace treaty, as they had done several times during the Sicilian Wars of the previous two centuries.

== Prelude ==
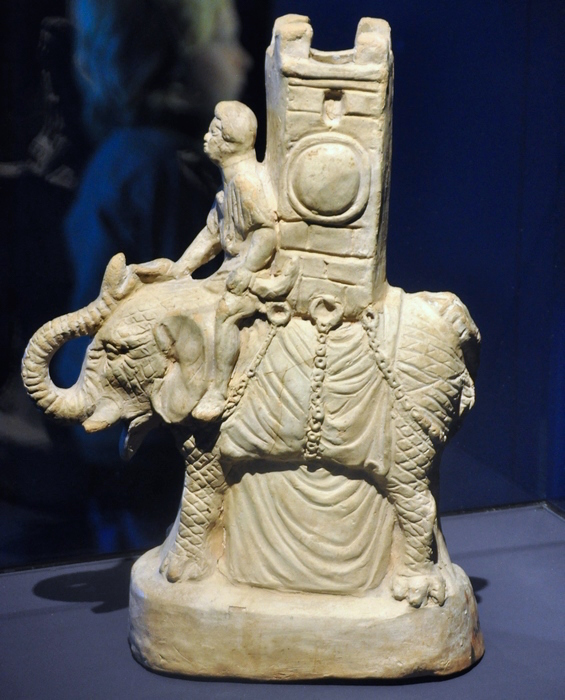
Roman statuette of a war elephant recovered from Pompeii

During 252 and 251 BC the Roman army avoided battle, according to Polybius because they feared the war elephants which the Carthaginians had shipped to Sicily. (Note: North Africa had indigenous African forest elephants at the time. These elephants were typically about 2.5-metre-high (8 ft) at the shoulder, and should not be confused with the larger African bush elephant.) In late 251 or early 250 BC the Carthaginian commander Hasdrubal, hearing that one consul had left Sicily for the winter with half of the Roman army, advanced on Panormus and boldly moved most of his army, including the elephants, towards the city walls. The remaining Roman consul, Lucius Caecilius Metellus, sent out skirmishers to harass the Carthaginians, keeping them constantly supplied with javelins from stocks within the city. The ground was covered with earthworks constructed during the Roman siege, making it difficult for the elephants to advance. Peppered with javelins and unable to retaliate, the elephants fled through the Carthaginian infantry behind them. Metellus had opportunistically moved a large force to the Carthaginians' left flank, and they charged into their disordered opponents. The Carthaginians fled; Metellus captured the elephants but did not permit a pursuit. Contemporary accounts do not report either side's losses, and modern historians consider later claims of 20,000–30,000 Carthaginian casualties improbable.

== Siege ==
Encouraged by their victory at Panormus, and their success against the elephants, the Roman Senate planned a major effort for 250 BC. By this time the Carthaginians held only two cities on Sicily: Lilybaeum and Drepana (modern Marsala and Trapani); these were well-fortified and situated on the west coast, where they could be supplied and reinforced by sea without the Romans being able to use their superior army to interfere. It was the long-standing Roman procedure to appoint two men each year as consuls, the most senior positions in the Roman political system; during wartime they each led an army. For 250 BC two men with significant military experience, having both previously served as consuls, were appointed: Gaius Atilius Regulus and Lucius Manlius Vulso. They jointly led a large force against Lilybaeum: more than 100,000 men, comprising 2 consular armies (Note: a standard consular army consisted of 2 Roman and 2 allied legions, the latter are also called alae.), supporting personnel and a strong naval contingent, possibly 200 ships. The garrison consisted of 7,000 infantry and 700 cavalry, mostly Greeks and Celts, under the command of a Carthaginian general called Himilco. Lilybaeum was the main Carthaginian base on Sicily, and in the opinion of the historian John Lazenby, its loss would have ended their presence on the island. It had very strong walls and several towers, which were defended by a dry moat which Diodoros reports as being 20 metres (60 feet) deep and 30 metres (90 feet) wide. In 278 BC it had withstood a siege by the Greek commander Pyrrhus of Epirus after he had captured every other Carthaginian possession on Sicily. The harbour was notoriously difficult to access safely without a knowledgeable local pilot because of dangerous shoals. (Note: The ancient Roman poet Vergil wrote of the "pitiless shoals of Lilybaeum".)

The Romans set up two fortified camps, assembled catapults, rams and other siege equipment, and assaulted the south-east corner of the fortifications. The ditch was filled and six of the towers of the outer wall were demolished. The Romans attempted to mine Lilybaeum's defences, and the defenders dug counter-mines. The defenders also endeavoured to repair the damage to the walls and towers each night and repeatedly sortied against the Roman siegeworks. Polybius wrote of fighting so fierce that there were as many casualties as in a pitched battle. The Romans also lost men due to disease, inadequate shelter, and poor food that included rancid meat.

Carthaginian citizens played a limited role in their army, and most of the rank and file were foreigners. Roman sources refer to these foreign fighters derogatively as "mercenaries". Their loyalty to Carthage was usually strong, but with their morale lowered by the fierce Roman assault, several senior officers slipped out one night to the Roman camp, intending to betray the city. They were in turn betrayed to Himilco by a Greek officer called Alexon. Himilco prevented the turncoats from returning to the city and rallied their troops by personal exhortation and promising a monetary bonus. As the Roman onslaught reached a peak, 50 Carthaginian warships gathered off the Aegates Islands, which lie 15–40 kilometres (9–25 mi) to the west of Sicily. Once there was a strong west wind, they sailed into Lilybaeum before the Romans could react. The Roman navy did not pursue them into the harbour because of the shoals. The ships unloaded a large quantity of supplies and reinforcements; either 4,000 or 10,000 men according to different sources. They evaded the Romans by leaving at night, evacuating the Carthaginian cavalry to the north where the Carthaginian commander of Drepana, Adherbal, still had some freedom of manoeuvre. The same night Himilco launched a major sally with most of the garrison, including the reinforcements, in an attempt to destroy the Roman siegeworks. After a fight which Lazenby describes as "confused and desperate", the Carthaginians were forced to withdraw without success.

The Romans sank 15 ships laden with rocks in the approaches to the harbour in an attempt to block it, but to no avail. They then made repeated attempts to block the harbour entrance with a heavy timber boom, but due to the prevailing sea conditions they were unsuccessful. The Carthaginian garrison was kept supplied by blockade runners, light and manoeuvrable galleys with highly trained crews and experienced pilots. Chief among the blockade runners was a galley captained by Hannibal the Rhodian, who taunted the Romans with the superiority of his vessel and crew. Eventually, the Romans captured Hannibal and his ship.

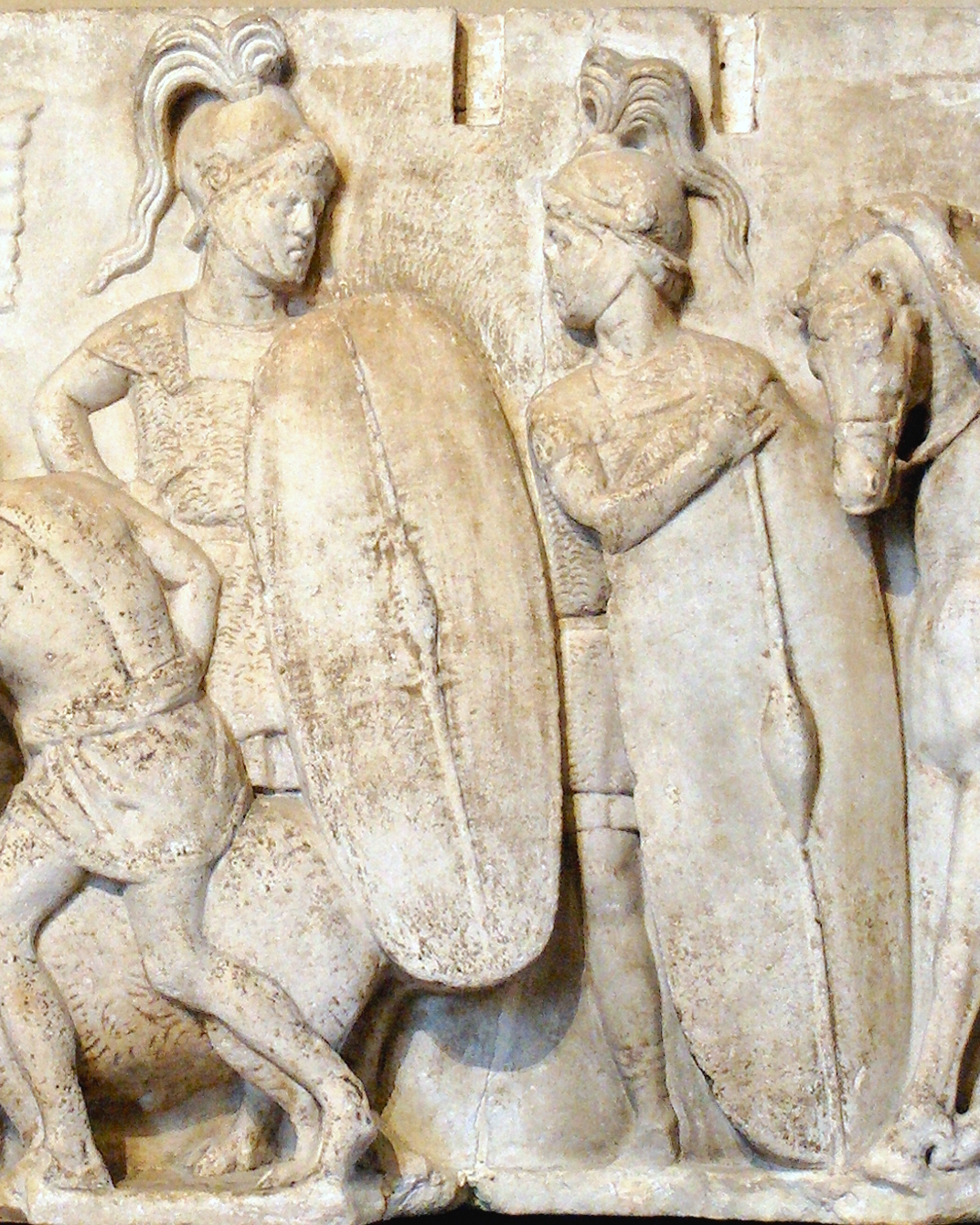
Detail from the Ahenobarbus relief showing two Roman foot-soldiers from the second century BC

The Roman assault continued and they broke down part of the wall using catapults; the defenders countered by building an inner wall. Filling the ditch in several places, the Romans distracted the Carthaginians with a feint at one part of the wall, and then seized a different section of it with a separate attack. By means which are unclear in the sources, Himilco destroyed them and recaptured the wall; Lazenby speculates that Himilco somehow tempted the Romans to advance from the section of wall they had captured and then destroyed them between the original outer wall and the newly built inner wall. A gale set in from the south west, which blew away the sheds protecting the besiegers' rams from having rocks and inflammatory material dropped on them and damaged or destroyed their siege towers. Taking advantage of this, the garrison sortied and started fires in three places. With the wind fanning the flames, they spread rapidly and the Romans attempting to dowse them and at the same time repel the Carthaginians were hampered by having smoke and flames in their faces. The siegeworks were substantially destroyed.

After the destruction of their siegeworks, the Romans constructed strong earth and timber walls to prevent further sorties, but which would also greatly hamper any further assaults on the city. The focus of the fighting moved to the north. In 247 BC the new Carthaginian commander on Sicily, Hamilcar Barca, (Note: Hamilcar Barca was the father of Hannibal.) established a base at Hertce, near Panormus, and harassed the Roman lines of communication for three years. He then redeployed to Eryx, near Drepana, from where he employed combined arms tactics in raids and interdiction. This guerrilla warfare kept the Roman legions pinned down and preserved Carthage's foothold in Sicily.

=== War at sea ===
The Romans made no further serious attempts to capture Lilybaeum by force, but settled back to starve out its defenders. To do so, they needed to cut its maritime supply line. In 249 BC one of the consuls, Publius Claudius Pulcher, decided this could be done by attacking the Carthaginian fleet, which was in the harbour of Drepana, 25 km (16 mi) up the coast. The Roman fleet sailed by night to carry out a surprise attack, but became scattered in the dark. The Carthaginian commander Adherbal was able to lead his fleet out of harbour before they were trapped there and counter-attacked in the Battle of Drepana. The Romans were pinned against the shore and after a hard day's fighting were heavily defeated by the more manoeuvrable Carthaginian ships with their better-trained crews. It was Carthage's greatest naval victory of the war.

Shortly after the battle, Adherbal was reinforced by another Carthaginian commander, Carthalo, with 70 ships. (Note: Two modern historians have speculated that Pulcher may have been aware of this impending reinforcement and that, if so, it was a decisive factor in his decision to attack while his opponent was weaker.) Adherbal brought Carthalo's command up to 100 ships and sent him to raid Lilybaeum, where he burnt several Roman ships. A little later, he harried a Roman supply convoy of 800 transports, escorted by 120 warships, to such effect that it was caught by a storm which sank all the vessels except for two. It was to be seven years before Rome again attempted to field a substantial fleet, while Carthage put most of its ships into reserve to save money and free up manpower. Inconsequential fighting continued over the following eight years around Panormus and Eryx. Hostilities between Roman and Carthaginian forces declined to small-scale land operations, which suited the Carthaginian strategy.

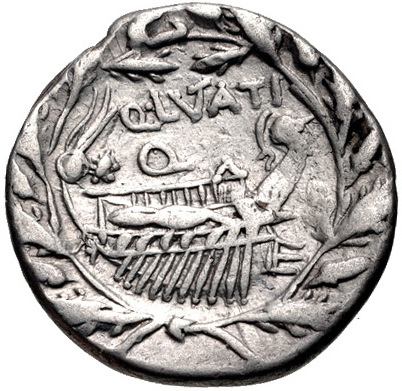
A Roman coin from 109 BC commemorating Catalus's victory at the Aegates; it shows a galley within a wreath of oak leaves

After more than 20 years of war, both states were financially and demographically exhausted. Evidence of Carthage's financial situation includes their request for a 2,000-talent loan (Note: 2,000 talents was approximately 52,000 kg (51 long tons) of silver.) from Ptolemaic Egypt, which was refused. Rome was also close to bankruptcy and the number of adult male citizens, who provided the manpower for the navy and the legions, had declined by 17 per cent since the start of the war. Goldsworthy describes Roman manpower losses as "appalling".

In late 243 BC, realising they would not capture Drepana and Lilybaeum unless they could extend their blockade to the sea, the Senate decided to build a new fleet. With the state's coffers exhausted, the Senate approached Rome's wealthiest citizens for loans to finance the construction of one ship each, repayable from the reparations to be imposed on Carthage once the war was won. The result was a fleet of approximately 200 large warships, built, equipped and crewed without state expense. The Romans modelled the ships of their new fleet on Hannibal the Rhodian's captured blockade runner, ensuring that their ships had especially good qualities. The Romans had gained sufficient experience at shipbuilding that with a proven vessel as a model they produced high-quality ships. Importantly, the Romans changed their tactics, from ones based on boarding their opponents' ships to ones based on outmanoeuvring and ramming them.

In 241 BC the Carthaginians raised a fleet slightly larger than the Romans', which they intended to use to run supplies into Sicily. It would then embark much of the Carthaginian army stationed there to use as marines. It was intercepted by the Roman fleet under Gaius Lutatius Catulus and Quintus Valerius Falto, and in the hard-fought Battle of the Aegates the better-trained Romans defeated the undermanned and ill-trained Carthaginian fleet. After this decisive victory, the Romans continued their land operations in Sicily against Lilybaeum.

== Aftermath ==
The Carthaginian Senate was reluctant to allocate the resources necessary to have another fleet built and manned. Carthage had taken nine months to fit out the fleet that was defeated, and if they took another nine months to ready another fleet, the Sicilian cities still holding out would run out of supplies and request terms of peace. Strategically, Carthage would have to build a fleet capable of defeating the Roman fleet, and then raise an army capable of defeating the Roman forces on Sicily. Instead, the Carthaginian Senate ordered Hamilcar to negotiate a peace treaty with the Romans; he left Sicily in a rage, convinced that the surrender was unnecessary. The next most senior Carthaginian commander on Sicily, Gisco, the governor of Lilybaeum, agreed the peace terms with the Romans. The Treaty of Lutatius was signed in the same year as the Battle of the Aegates and brought the First Punic War to its end; Carthage evacuated Sicily, handed over all prisoners taken during the war and paid an indemnity of 3,200 talents – approximately 82,000 kg (81 long tons) of silver – over ten years. The Carthaginian army on Sicily was concentrated in its last stronghold, Lilybaeum, from where it was shipped to Carthage in stages.

Tensions remained high between the two states, and both continued to expand in the western Mediterranean. When Carthage besieged the Roman-protected town of Saguntum in eastern Iberia in 218 BC, it ignited the Second Punic War with Rome. At the start of this war there were reports of a Carthaginian plan to recapture Lilybaeum, and several Carthaginian ships operated against the port, but the Roman consul on Sicily countered them and they came to nothing.

== Notes, citations and sources ==
=== Sources ===
- Bagnall, Nigel (1999). The Punic Wars: Rome, Carthage and the Struggle for the Mediterranean. London: Pimlico. ISBN 978-0-7126-6608-4.
- Bringmann, Klaus (2007). A History of the Roman Republic. Cambridge; Malden, Massachusetts: Polity. ISBN 978-0-7456-3371-8.
- Briscoe, John (2003). "The Second Punic War". In Astin, A. E.; Walbank, F. W.; Frederiksen, M. W.; Ogilvie, R. M. (eds.). The Cambridge Ancient History: Rome and the Mediterranean to 133 B.C. Vol. VIII. Cambridge: Cambridge University Press. pp. 44–80. ISBN 0-521-23448-4.
- Casson, Lionel (1991). The Ancient Mariners (2nd ed.). Princeton, New Jersey: Princeton University Press. ISBN 978-0-691-06836-7.
- Collins, Roger (1998). Spain: An Oxford Archaeological Guide. Oxford: Oxford University Press. ISBN 978-0-19-285300-4.
- Crawford, Michael (1974). Roman Republican Coinage. Cambridge: Cambridge University Press. OCLC 859598398.
- Curry, Andrew (2012). "The Weapon That Changed History". Archaeology. 65 (1): 32–37. JSTOR 41780760.
- Edwell, Peter (2015) [2011]. "War Abroad: Spain, Sicily, Macedon, Africa". In Hoyos, Dexter (ed.). A Companion to the Punic Wars. Chichester, West Sussex: John Wiley. pp. 320–338. ISBN 978-1-119-02550-4.
- Goldsworthy, Adrian (2006). The Fall of Carthage: The Punic Wars 265–146 BC. London: Phoenix. ISBN 978-0-304-36642-2 – via Google.
- Hau, Lisa (2016). Moral History from Herodotus to Diodorus Siculus. Edinburgh: Edinburgh University Press. ISBN 978-1-4744-1107-3.
- Hoyos, Dexter (2015) [2011]. A Companion to the Punic Wars. Chichester, West Sussex: John Wiley. ISBN 978-1-119-02550-4.
- Konrad, C. (2015). "After Drepana". The Classical Quarterly. 65 (1): 192–203. doi:10.1017/S0009838814000032. S2CID 231889835.
- Lazenby, John (1996). The First Punic War: A Military History. Stanford, California: Stanford University Press. ISBN 978-0-8047-2673-3 – via Google.
- Miles, Richard (2011). Carthage Must be Destroyed. London: Penguin. ISBN 978-0-14-101809-6.
- Mineo, Bernard (2015) [2011]. "Principal Literary Sources for the Punic Wars (apart from Polybius)". In Hoyos, Dexter (ed.). A Companion to the Punic Wars. Chichester, West Sussex: John Wiley. pp. 111–128. ISBN 978-1-119-02550-4.
- Rankov, Boris (2015) [2011]. "A War of Phases: Strategies and Stalemates". In Hoyos, Dexter (ed.). A Companion to the Punic Wars. Chichester, West Sussex: John Wiley. pp. 149–166. ISBN 978-1-4051-7600-2.
- Royal, Jeffrey G.; Tusa, Sebastiano, eds. (2019). The Site of the Battle of the Aegates Islands at the End of the First Punic War. Fieldwork, Analyses and Perspectives, 2005–2015. Bibliotheca Archaeologica. Vol. 60. Rome: L'Erma di Bretschneider. ISBN 978-88-913-1835-0.
- Scullard, H.H. (2006) [1989]. "Carthage and Rome". In Walbank, F. W.; Astin, A. E.; Frederiksen, M. W. & Ogilvie, R. M. (eds.). Cambridge Ancient History Part 2. Vol. VII (2nd ed.). Cambridge: Cambridge University Press. pp. 486–569. ISBN 0-521-23446-8.
- Shutt, Rowland (1938). "Polybius: A Sketch". Greece & Rome. 8 (22): 50–57. doi:10.1017/S001738350000588X. JSTOR 642112. S2CID 162905667.
- Sidwell, Keith C.; Jones, Peter V. (1997). The World of Rome: An Introduction to Roman Culture. Cambridge University Press. ISBN 978-0-521-38600-5 – via Google.
- Tarn, W. W. (1907). "The Fleets of the First Punic War". The Journal of Hellenic Studies. 27: 48–60. doi:10.2307/624404. JSTOR 624404. S2CID 163828693.
- Tipps, G. K. (1985). "The Battle of Ecnomus". Historia: Zeitschrift für Alte Geschichte. 34 (4): 432–465. JSTOR 4435938.
- Walbank, F. W. (1990). Polybius. Vol. I. Berkeley: University of California Press. ISBN 978-0-520-06981-7.
- Warmington, Brian (1993) [1960]. Carthage. New York: Barnes & Noble, Inc. ISBN 978-1-56619-210-1 – via Googe.
