= 240s BC =

Decade

This article concerns the period 249 BC – 240 BC.

== Events ==
=== 249 BC ===
==== By place ====
====== Roman Republic ======
- The Battle of Drepana involves the Romans, under the command of the Roman consul Publius Claudius Pulcher, attacking the Carthaginian fleet, under the command of Adherbal, in the harbour of Drepanum (modern Trapani, Sicily). The Romans are badly defeated and lose 93 of their 123 vessels.
- Following the disastrous defeat of Roman forces at the Battle of Drepana, Publius Claudius Pulcher is fined 120,000 asses and his colleague, Lucius Junius Pullus, commits suicide. Aulus Atilius Calatinus is then elected dictator and leads an army into Sicily, becoming the first dictator to lead a Roman army outside Italy. The Roman forces at Lilybaeum are relieved, and Eryx, near Drapana, is seized. Its idol of Astarte is transported to Rome, where it becomes the Erycine Venus.

====== China ======
- The last remnants of the Zhou dynasty, having rebelled against the State of Qin, are defeated by Prime Minister Lü Buwei.
- The Qin general Meng Ao seizes the Taiyuan region from the State of Zhao.
- King Kaolie of Chu annexes the State of Lu.

=== 248 BC ===
==== By place ====
====== China ======
- The Qin general Meng Ao captures the Wei cities of Gaodu and Ji.
- Meng Ao then annexes 37 towns and cities from the State of Zhao, conquering the cities of Yuci, Xincheng and Langmeng.

====== India ======
- The Mauryan king Ashoka is dedicated to the propagation of Buddhism and begins establishing monuments marking several significant sites in the life of Gautama Buddha.

=== 247 BC ===
==== By place ====
====== Carthage ======
- In Numidia Carthaginian general Hanno conquered the city of Theveste (nicknamed: Hekatompylos) after which he negotiated a peace settlement with the Numidians ending Carthage's war with the Numidians. He was praised by both parties for the fairness of the treaty.
- By this stage in the Punic War, Carthage has lost to Rome all its Sicilian possessions except Lilybaeum (now Marsala) and Drepanum (now Trapani). In the winter of 248/7, Hamilcar Barca takes over the chief command of the Carthaginian forces in Sicily at a time when the island is almost completely in the hands of the Romans. Landing on the north-west of the island with a small mercenary force, he seizes a strong position on Mount Ercte (Monte Pellegrino, near Palermo), and not only successfully defends himself against all attacks, but also carries his raids as far as the coast of southern Italy.

====== China ======
- General Wang He of the State of Qin takes the city of Shangdang from the State of Zhao and establishes Taiyuan Commandery.
- After suffering an initial defeat to Wei general Wuji in the Battle of Hewai, the armies of Qin, led by Meng Ao and Wang He, defeat a combined attempt by the other kingdoms of China to break through the strategic Hangu Pass and invade the Qin heartland of Guanzhong.
- The 13-year-old Ying Zheng, later called Qin Shi Huang, succeeds his father Zhuangxiang of Qin (Zichu) on the throne. Prime Minister Lü Buwei becomes the regent of the king.

=== 246 BC ===
==== By place ====
====== Egypt ======
- Egypt's Ptolemy II dies and is succeeded by his son, Ptolemy III. At the time of Ptolemy II's death, Egypt comprises the ancient kingdom of Egypt in the Nile Valley, Cyrene, Judea and the coast of southern Syria, Cyprus and a number of cities on the shores and islands of the Aegean Sea. The Macedonian Ptolemies maintain their authority over their territories with a small mercenary army made up of Macedonians and other Greeks.

====== India ======
- The Ashokan pillar in Lauriya, Nandangarh (from the Maurya period) is made.

====== Seleucid Empire ======
- Antiochus II leaves Berenice in order to live again with his former wife Laodice and his son Seleucus. However, Laodice poisons him and proclaims her son as King Seleucus II Callinicus, while her supporters in Antioch kill Berenice and her children who have taken refuge at Daphne, near Antioch, in Syria.
- Berenice's brother, Ptolemy III, sets about to avenge his sister's murder by invading Syria which begins the Third Syrian War (also known as the Laodicean War). Ptolemy III's navy, perhaps with the aid of rebels in the cities, advances against Seleucus II's forces as far as Thrace, across the Hellespont, and also captures some islands off the Anatolian coast.
- Ptolemy III wins major victories over Seleucus II in Syria and Anatolia and briefly occupies Antioch. These victories are marred by the loss of the Cyclades to Antigonus II Gonatas in the Battle of Andros.
- Seleucus II Callinicus' mother, Laodice attempts to take control over the Seleucid Empire by insisting that Seleucus II make his younger brother, Antiochus Hierax, co-regent and give him all the Seleucid territory in Anatolia. Antiochus promptly declares independence and begins fighting a war with his brother.
- In order to secure the Bactrian King Diodotus' friendship, Seleucus II Callinicus arranges the marriage of one of his sisters to King Diodotus.

====== Roman Republic ======
- With Hamilcar Barca wearing the Romans down in Sicily, the Romans, by private subscription, build another fleet with the aim of regaining command of the sea.
- In Rome, the number of praetors is increased from one to two. The second praetor is appointed to relieve the backlog of judicial business and to give the Republic a magistrate with Imperium who can field an army in an emergency when both consuls are away fighting a war.

====== China ======
- The Zhengguo Canal, approximately one hundred miles long, is built across the current-day province of Shaanxi in China, greatly adding to the agricultural productivity of the area and to the military potency of the Qin dynasty.
- The Qin general Meng Ao crushes a revolt in Jinyang.

=== 245 BC ===
==== By place ====
====== Egypt ======
- Babylon and Susa fall to the Ptolemaic armies of Ptolemy III.
- Following a long engagement, Ptolemy III marries Berenice II, the daughter of Magas, king of Cyrene; thereby reuniting Egypt and Cyrenaica.

====== Greece ======
- After the death of his nephew, Alexander of Corinth, Antigonus II gives Nicaea, Alexander's widow, to his son Demetrius in marriage. Through this action, Antigonus II regains Corinth which has been independent while under the rule of Alexander of Corinth.
- Aratus of Sicyon is elected general (strategos) of the Achaean League.

====== China ======
- The Qin general Pao Gong captures the Wei city of Juan.
- The Zhao general Lian Po captures the Wei city of Fanyang.

=== 244 BC ===
==== By place ====
====== Greece ======
- Agis IV succeeds his father, Eudamidas II, as Eurypontid king of Sparta.
- The war in Asia Minor and the Aegean Sea intensifies as the Achaean League allies itself to Ptolemy III Euergetes of Egypt, while Seleucus II secures two allies in the Black Sea region. Ptolemy III's armies reach as far as Bactria and the borders of India in their attacks on the Seleucid Empire.
- By defeating the Egyptian fleet at Andros, Antigonus II is able to maintain his control over the Aegean Sea.

====== Carthage ======
- Hamilcar Barca transfers his army to the slopes of Mount Eryx (Monte San Giuliano), from which he is able to lend support to the besieged garrison in the neighbouring town of Drepanum (Trapani).

====== China ======
- The Qin general Meng Ao annexes 13 cities from the State of Han.
- The Qin envoy Gan Luo persuades King Daoxiang of Zhao to cede five cities.
- The State of Zhao annexes dozens of cities from the State of Yan.

=== 243 BC ===
==== By place ====
====== Egypt ======
- Ptolemy III returns from Syria due to a revolt in Egypt. As a result, Seleucus II is able to regain control of his kingdom with the Egyptians being pushed out of Mesopotamia and part of Northern Syria.
- Ptolemy III returns from his conquests of Seleucid territory with a large amount of treasure and works of art, including many statues of Egyptian gods carried off to Persia by Cambyses. He restores the statues to the Egyptian temples and earns the title of Euergetes ("Benefactor").

====== Greece ======
- Without a declaration of hostilities, Greek statesman, Aratus of Sicyon, who has gradually built up the Achaean League into a major power in Greece, makes a surprise attack on Corinth and forces the withdrawal of the Macedonian occupation troops. Megara, Troezen, and Epidaurus also desert the Macedonian King Antigonus II.
- Drawing upon the tradition of the Spartan lawgiver, Lycurgus, the young Eurypontid king of Sparta, Agis IV, seeks to reform a system that distributes the land and wealth unequally and burden the poor with debt. He proposes the cancellation of debts and the division of the Spartan homeland into separate lots for each of its citizens. Full citizenship is to be extended to many perioeci (voteless freemen) and foreigners. In addition to pursuing these reforms, Agis seeks the restoration of the Lycurgan system of military training. Agis is supported by his wealthy mother and grandmother (who surrender their property), by his uncle Agesilaus, and by Lysander, who is an ephor (magistrate with the duty of limiting the power of the king).

====== China ======
- The Qin general Meng Ao sacks the Wei cities of Shizhang and Yougui.
- The Zhao general Li Mu takes the cities of Wusui and Fancheng from the State of Yan.

=== 242 BC ===
==== By place ====
====== Roman Republic ======
- The Roman consul and commander, Gaius Lutatius Catulus, blockades the Sicilian cities of Lilybaeum and Drepanum with a fleet of 200 ships.

====== Egypt ======
- The destruction of the Egyptian fleet by the Macedonians ends the naval supremacy of the Ptolemies but does not force them to relinquish their territories in Syria and the Aegean Sea.

====== China ======
- The Qin general Meng Ao annexes 20 towns and cities from the State of Wei, conquering the cities of Suanzao, Yan, Xu, Changping, Yongqiu and Shanyang. He then establishes the Dongjun Commandery.
- The Zhao general Pang Nuan defeats the army of the State of Yan and kills its general Chu Xin.

=== 241 BC ===
==== By place ====
====== Greece ======
- The Eurypontid King of Sparta, Agis IV, is called away from Sparta when Aratus of Sicyon, temporarily Sparta's ally, requests Agis' aid in his war against the Aetolians. Upon his return, Agis finds that his supporters are discontented with the rule of his uncle, Agesilaus, and are disillusioned by the delay in implementing Agis IV's reforms. As a result, the Agiad king of Sparta, Leonidas II, gains power, supported by mercenaries. Rather than engage in a war with Leonidas, Agis takes sanctuary in a temple, but is enticed out, summarily tried and then executed, along with his mother and grandmother.
- Archidamus V, son of the Spartan King, Eudamidas II, and grandson of Archidamus IV, flees to Messenia after the murder of his brother Agis IV.
- As general of the Achaean League, Aratus of Sicyon defeats the Aetolians at Pellene and then pursues a policy of establishing democracies in the Peloponnese.

====== Roman Republic ======
- March 10 – Battle of the Aegates: The Carthaginian fleet sent to relieve the Roman blockade of the Sicilian cities of Lilybaeum and Drepanum is totally defeated near the Aegates Islands off western Sicily by the Roman fleet led by Roman consul and commander Gaius Lutatius Catulus. The result is a decisive Roman victory which forces an end to the protracted First Punic War, to Rome's distinct advantage.
- The Romans capture Sicily
- The Carthaginians under Hamilcar Barca are forced to accept severe peace terms and agree to evacuate Sicily. As part of the treaty with Rome, Carthage agrees to abandon all its claims on Sicily, to refrain from sailing her warships in Italian waters and to pay an indemnity of 3,200 talents. However, the Carthaginian army is allowed to return home with its arms. Rome is now the dominant power in the Western Mediterranean basin.
- The Falisci people of Falerii Veteres revolt against Rome, but is crushed in six days. Falerii Veteres is destroyed and the people resettled to the less defensible Falerii Novi.

====== Carthage ======
- A mercenary army of some 20,000 is transported from Sicily to Carthaginian territory, by Carthaginian commander, Gisco. Upon arrival in Carthaginian territory, the mercenaries submit a demand to Hanno the Great for payment of their contracts. Hanno attempts, unsuccessfully, to convince the mercenaries to accept smaller payments due to Carthage's impoverished post-war conditions. Negotiations break down. The mercenaries take up arms, march on Tunis, occupy it, and threaten Carthage directly.
- Given their strong position, the mercenaries inflate their demands and request payment for the non-mercenary Libyan conscripts in the army as well. Gesco is sent to negotiate with the mercenaries at Tunis. Negotiations break down, Gisco is captured, and the Mercenary War commences.

====== Pergamum ======
- Attalus I Soter succeeds his uncle, Eumenes I, to the throne of Pergamum. He defeats the Galatians at the Battle of the Caecus River.

====== Egypt ======
- Peace is finally reached between Ptolemy III and Seleucus II. Ptolemy manages to keep the Orontes River region in Syria and Antioch as well as Ephesus in Asia Minor and Thrace and Cilicia.

====== China ======
- Five of the seven major warring states: Chu, Zhao, Wei, Yan, and Han, form an alliance to fight the rising power of Qin. King Kaolie of Chu is named the leader of the alliance, and Lord Chunshen the military commander, with Pang Nuan of Zhao also serving as a general. The coalition penetrates as far as the Qin town of Zui, west of the strategic Hangu Pass and in the Qin heartland of Guanzhong, but they are defeated. Afterwards, Chu moves its capital east to Shouchun, further away from the threat of Qin. Qin counterattacks, sacking the Wei city of Chaoge.

=== 240 BC ===
==== By place ====
====== Carthage ======
- Two of Carthage's mercenary commanders – Spendius and Mathos – convince the Libyan conscripts of the mercenary army occupying the Carthaginian city of Tunis to accept their leadership. They persuade the native Libyans that Carthage will take revenge against them for their part in the conflict once the foreign mercenaries are paid and sent home. They then convince the combined mercenary armies to revolt against Carthage and convince the various native Libyan towns and cities to back the revolt. Spendius and Mathos then take the Carthaginian commander Gesco as a hostage. What has started as an argument over pay owed to soldiers by the Carthaginian Government, explodes into a full-scale revolt, known as the Mercenary War.
- The Libyan forces loyal to the mercenaries besiege the towns of Utica and Hippacritae, which refuse to defect to the mercenaries.
- Hanno the Great is given command of the Carthaginian forces. However, the mercenaries defeat the Carthaginian armies in the Battle of Utica.
- Carthage decides to give Hamilcar Barca joint command with Hanno the Great. Hamilcar Barca is able to end the siege of Utica by the mercenaries. He is then placed in complete command of the Carthaginian forces and defeats the mercenaries in the Battle of the Bagradas River.
- After the Numidian mercenary leader Narawas defects to Hamilcar Barca, Numidian reinforcements (about 2,000 men) help him defeat the mercenaries again. Hamilcar pardons his captured prisoners, accepting into his army anyone who will fight for Carthage, and exiling anyone who will not.

====== Roman Republic ======
- Rome takes over full control of Sicily and stations a legion there.

====== China ======
- The Qin general Meng Ao takes the Zhao cities of Long, Hu and Qingdu but then dies en route to the Wei city of Ji. This is then captured by Meng Ao's son Meng Wu.

==== By topic ====
====== Literature ======
- The first Latin tragedy by Livius Andronicus, Achilles, is first produced.

====== Astronomy ======
- May 25 – Chinese astronomers make the first recorded observation of Halley's Comet.
- The Hellenistic period Mathematician Eratosthenes estimates the Earth's circumference to be 252,000 stadia, a figure between 2%-20% off modern measurements.

== Births ==
247 BC

- Hannibal Barca, Carthaginian military commander (d. c. 183 BC)

246 BC

- Arsinoe III, queen of Egypt from 220 BC, daughter of Ptolemy III and Berenice II (d. 204 BC)

245 BC

- Hasdrubal Barca, Carthaginian general and Younger brother of Hannibal (d. 207 BC)

243 BC

- Mago Barca, Carthaginian general and brother of Hannibal (d. 203 BC)
- Prusias I Cholus (the Lame), king of Bithynia (approximate date)
- Seleucus III Ceraunus, king of the Seleucid Kingdom (d. 223 BC)

242 BC

- Antiochus III the Great, Seleucid king of Hellenistic Syria (d. 187 BC)

241 BC

- Antiochus III the Great, younger son of Seleucus II Callinicus, the 6th ruler of the Seleucid Empire (d. 187 BC)

== Deaths ==
249 BC

- King Hui of Zhou, last Zhou claimant to the throne of China, is executed.

247 BC

- Alexander of Corinth, Macedonian Greek governor and tyrant
- Moggaliputta-Tissa, Indian Buddhist monk and philosopher
- Zhuangxiang of Qin, Chinese king of the Qin State (b. 281 BC)

246 BC

- Ptolemy II Philadelphus, king of Egypt from 285 BC, second king of the Ptolemaic dynasty, who has extended his power by skillful diplomacy, developed agriculture and commerce, and made Alexandria a leading centre of the arts and sciences (b. 308 BC)
- Antiochus II Theos, king of the Seleucid dominions in the Middle East from 261 BC. He has spent much of his reign at war with Egypt, recovering much of the territory in Anatolia lost in earlier wars between the Ptolemaic and Seleucid dynasties (b. c. 287 BC)
- Berenice, daughter of Ptolemy II Philadelphus and Arsinoe, wife of the Seleucid ruler Antiochus II Theos, supplanting his first wife, Laodice, whose children she has persuaded him to bar from the succession to the throne in favour of her own.

245 BC

- Apollonius of Rhodes, Greek poet, grammarian, and author of the Argonautica, an epic in four books on the voyage of the Argonauts (b. c. 295 BC)

244 BC

- Eudamidas II, king of Sparta

243 BC

- Persaeus, Greek Stoic philosopher and friend of Zeno of Citium
- Xinling, Chinese statesman and general (Warring States Period)

242 BC

- Maharani Devi, Mauryan empress and wife of Ashoka (approximate date)

241 BC

- Agis IV, Eurypontid King of Sparta who has failed in his attempt to reform Sparta's economic and political structure (b. c. 265 BC)
- Agesistrata, Spartan Queen Consort
- Arcesilaus, Greek philosopher, who has become the sixth head of the Greek Academy founded by Plato (b. c. 316 BC)
- Eumenes I, ruler of Pergamum from 263 BC, liberator of the city from the overlordship of the Seleucids
- Tiberius Coruncanius, Roman consul and military commander for the battles against Pyrrhus of Epirus

240 BC

- Aratus, Greek poet from Soli in Cilicia, best remembered for his poem on astronomy Phaenomena (b. c. 315 BC)
- Aristomachos the Elder, Greek tyrant from Argos
- Asandhimitra, Mauryan empress and wife of Ashoka
- Callimachus, Greek poet and librarian
- Posidippus, Greek epigrammatic poet
- Zou Yan, Chinese philosopher (b. 305 BC)
- Meng Ao, Qin general

== Bibliography ==
- Schinz, Alfred (1996). Axel Menges (ed.). The Magic Square: Cities in Ancient China. Stuttgart, London: Daehan Printing & Publishing Co.
