= Battle of Phintias =

249 BC battle near Sicily

- Part of the First Punic War
Date	249 BC
Location	Off Phintias (modern Licata), Sicily 37.1012°N 13.9368°E
Result	Carthaginian victory

Belligerents
Carthage	Roman Republic

Commanders and leaders
Carthalo	Lucius Junius Pullus

Strength
120 warships	120 warships, 800 transports

Casualties and losses
None	17 ships sunk, 13 damaged, all but 2 destroyed in storm

The naval Battle of Phintias took place in 249 BC during the First Punic War near modern Licata, southern Sicily between the fleets of Carthage under Carthalo and the Roman Republic under Lucius Junius Pullus. The Carthaginian fleet had intercepted the Roman fleet off Phintias, and had forced it to seek shelter. Carthalo, who heeded the warning of his pilots about impending storms, retired to the east to avoid the coming weather. The Roman fleet did not take any precautions and subsequently was destroyed with the loss of all but two ships. The Carthaginians exploited their victory by raiding the coasts of Roman Italy until 243 BC. The Romans did not mount a major naval effort until 242 BC.

== Prelude ==
The string of Roman naval victories, such as Mylae and Ecnomus, had given them command of the sea and the confidence to make a direct attack on Carthage itself, which ultimately ended in the defeat of the Romans in Bagrades and the loss of their fleet in a storm off Camarina in 255 BC. The Romans avoided engaging the Carthaginian army in Sicily until 253 BC, when the Carthaginians were defeated in the Battle of Panormus in 250 BC. Romans next attacked the Carthaginian stronghold of Lilybaeum governed by Himilco. The Carthaginian commander at Drepana, Adherbal, sent out ships to raid the Sicilian and Italian coasts, while Carthaginian cavalry from Drepana ambushed Roman supply operation. The supply situation became desperate, men became ill from eating rotting meat, and only the overland grain sent by Hiero II of Syracuse warded off disaster for the Romans.

In response, Lilybaeum was blockaded by a Roman fleet commanded by the year's consuls Publius Claudius Pulcher and Lucius Junius Pullus. Pulcher arrived in Sicily first with part of the fleet and took charge of the operations, while Junius stayed back in Italy to organize supplies and ready the remainder of the fleet. Carthage managed to resupply Lilybaeum through the exploits of a small squadron led by a commander named Hannibal, son of Hamilcar, who managed to break the siege in broad daylight and deliver supplies to the garrison of Lilybaeum. Hannibal left the city carrying the useless cavalry horses and sailed to the harbour of Drepana at night before the Romans knew what was happening and could respond. This supply operation was repeated several times, which negated the whole effect of the blockade, since the Punic garrison was being fed and kept in contact with Carthage.

Shortly after, a sailor, identified as Hannibal the Rhodian, openly defied the Roman fleet by sailing around the fleet in order to spy on the town and relay the news of the goings on inside of Lilybaeum to the Carthaginian Senate and the Carthaginian commander, Adherbal. This provoked the Roman commander into attacking the harbour of Drepana, where the Roman fleet was crushed with the loss of 93 ships, leaving the Carthaginian fleet free to take the battle to the Romans.

=== Carthage in control ===
Adherbal sent Roman prisoners and some of the captured ships to Carthage. Hannibal, who had commanded the relief operations at Lilybaeum, then sailed to Panormus with 30 ships and captured Roman transports carrying supplies for the Roman land forces besieging Lilybaeum and returned to Drepana. Adherbal kept part of the captured supplies at Drepana and sent the rest to the Carthaginian garrison defending Lilybaeum. He next reinforced the 70-ship fleet under Carthalo, which had arrived from Carthage, with another 30 ships from his own fleet. Carthalo sailed at night from Drepana and attacked the Roman ships at anchor near Lilybaeum at dawn, burning some of them and towing some back as trophies, while Himilco, the garrison commander at Lilybaeum, sortied against the Romans simultaneously to prevent them from interfering with the fleet operation .

Carthalo, probably hearing that another Roman fleet had sailed from Syracuse for Lilybaeum, held a council of war, and persuaded the Carthaginian commanders to confront the Romans at sea. He sailed with a fleet to Heraclea Minoa in anticipation of intercepting the Lilybaeum bound Roman convoy, while Adherbal kept his fleet at Drepana to guard against any Roman naval activity. According to Diodorus, Carthalo commanded 120 ships at Phintias. He had arrived in Sicily with a 70 ship contingent, and had received another 30 ships from Adherbal. At Lilybaeum, Carthalo had captured a number of Roman ships, while Adherbal had captured 93 ships at Drepana after the Roman defeat. Some of these captured ships had been sent back to Carthage as trophies, some of the ships of Adherbal's fleet may have suffered battle damage and had become unseaworthy, so Carthalo had either manned some of the captured ships with Punic crews or had obtained more ships from Adherbal or Carthage.

=== Roman supply convoy ===
Consul Lucius Junius Pullus was in Italy when Pulcher lost his fleet. It is possible that he was ignorant of the disaster when he set sail from Italy, probably in July of 249 BC, with 60 warships and other relief ships. He was joined by another contingent of ships from Sicily at Messina, bringing his fleet up to 120 warships and nearly 800 transports, which carried the supplies for the land army. Given that Rome had lost a supply fleet at Panormus, success of this convoy was crucial for maintaining the Roman army in Sicily. It is likely Junius learned about the Roman defeat at Drepana and the capture of the supply fleet at Panormus after his arrival in Sicily. It would explain why he chose not to sail along the northern coast of Sicily, as Drepana and the victorious Carthaginian fleet lay between him and Lilybaeum along that route. He chose to sail along the southern coast of Sicily.

Junius first sailed to Syracuse, which had a big harbor to accommodate all his ships. Hiero II was an ally and the Romans obtained supplies of corn and other provisions from Syracuse. Junius then sent half of the transports, under the command of Quaestors, west towards Lilybaeum with the intention of easing the supply situation of the Roman army, while he stayed in Syracuse for some time with the remainder of the Roman fleet and the other transports, rounding up stragglers and gathering more supplies. This convoy sailing to Lilybaeum was either escorted by a few warships (Polybius 1.52.6-8) or by the bulk of the Roman war fleet (Diodorus 24.1.7-9).

== Battle ==
Carthalo meanwhile had anchored at Heraclea Minoa and posted lookouts to keep watch for the Roman fleet. Alerted by his lookouts of the approach of the Roman fleet, he sailed out to intercept them. What transpired next is recorded differently by Polybius and Diodorus, and it is hard to fully reconcile them.

=== Narrative of Polybius ===
A generic description of the battle of Phintias, not to exact scale.

According to Polybius (1.53.8), the Roman scout ships alerted their fleet in time for the quaestors to turn back, avoid engaging the superior Carthaginian fleet and sail east to the town of Phintias (Diodorus 24.1.7). The town had no harbor, so the Roman ships took refuge along some creeks and rocks projecting into the sea. The quaestors obtained mangonels and catapults from the town, and posted them off the hills and rocks to protect the fleet. When the Carthaginian fleet arrived, Carthalo approached the Roman fleet expecting the Roman crews to panic and abandon their ships. When the Romans stood fast, he closed in with the intention of blockading them. However, after seeing their defensive preparations, he opted not to endanger his ships, managed to capture a few of the Roman transports, then sailed to the mouth of a nearby river, anchored his ships and waited for the Romans to set sail again.

It was logical for the advance Roman fleet to avoid battle, as they only had a few warships as escorts. This probably meant Junius either did not know of the Roman defeat at Drepana or did not expect any Carthaginian activity along the southern route. The Carthaginian fleet presumably only caught up with the Romans near Phintias and forced them to seek refuge, as the Carthaginians managed to capture a few Roman supply ships but the bulk of the Roman fleet escaped. Carthalo then anchored near the mouth of a river to the west, and awaited further developments. Carthalo had captured a few Roman supply ships, so presumably he could stay in the area for some time. If he was playing the waiting game with the Romans, he was at a disadvantage, as the Romans had ample supplies. Carthalo could meet his immediate needs from the captured Romans ships and whatever he had on board, but for the long haul he would have had to arrange provisions from Lilybaeum by sea.

The Roman fleet from Syracuse under Consul L. Junius, probably unaware of what had transpired, had sailed from Syracuse and showed up before the Roman ships at Phintias made any moves. Carthalo, warned of the arrival of Junius, probably by scout ships patrolling the area, sailed past Phintias to engage the Romans as far from the Roman ships at Phintias as possible. If the Romans at Phintias had received any advance news of the arrival of their consul's fleet, they did not make any move to join him. The consul refused battle and anchored his fleet along the shore further to the east, while the Carthaginian fleet anchored somewhere along the coast between the two Roman fleets. This was unusual because the combined Roman fleet could have surrounded the Carthaginians by coordinating their movements.

Carthalo's choice to anchor his fleet between two Roman fleets after the arrival of Lucius Junius is also unconventional. Besides the logistical difficulties, Carthaginians risked being caught in a pincer movement by the Romans, and unless the Carthaginians anchored in a sheltered cove inaccessible from land, they risked being attacked from the land on their beached ships. Before Carthalo chose his next move, Carthaginian ship captains familiar with the local weather warned him of approaching storms. Carthalo now sailed away, not west towards Lilybaeum, but to the east, unhindered by the Roman fleet, rounded Cape Pachynon with difficulty and rode out the storm. The Roman fleet probably was slow to move and was later destroyed near Camarina when the storm finally broke, although the consul survived the calamity.

=== Narrative of Diodorus ===
A generic description of the battle of Phintias, not to exact scale.

Diodorus gives a different version of the events. He states (24.1.7-9) that the quaestors led the bulk of the Roman fleet (probably 84 out of the 120 Roman ships plus any allied squadrons - It is logical for the advanced fleet to be escorted by most of the fleet in seas controlled by Carthage) towards Lilybaeum, and was intercepted by the Carthaginian fleet off Gela. The panicked Romans sailed west and took refuge at Phintias, Carthalo gave chase, and off Phintias his ships attacked the Romans, disabling 50 transports, while 17 warships were sunk and 13 were crippled. In this narrative, Carthalo did not wait at Heraclea but was sailing east when he met the westbound Roman fleet. The Romans panicked, and probably knowing they could not outrun the Carthaginians, chose to sail west and seek refuge at Phintias. Carthaginian warships were faster than the Roman equivalents, and the Roman fleet had transports with them, which were slower than the warships. Thus, a running battle with Carthaginians while the Roman fleet tried to double back east towards Syracuse would have risked losing several ships to the faster, more maneuverable Carthaginians. As the transports headed for safety at Phintias, fifteen miles west of Gela, the Roman escorts presumably engaged the Carthaginians in a holding action to give their transports time to get away and took a beating before retiring to Phintias.

Carthalo, however, did not anchor near Phintias in this narrative. He sailed west and anchored near the mouth of River Halykos near Heraclea Minoa, forty miles to the west presumably because of logistical reasons. Burdening warships with supplies makes the ships heavy and sluggish, as the Carthaginians were later to find out at their disadvantage at the Battle of Aegades Islands. Anchoring a fleet in enemy controlled territory and allowing the crew to forage runs the risk of being surprised by the enemy in land and at sea, as the Carthaginians would be before the Battle of Ebro River and the Romans after the Battle of Cissa. When consul Junius arrived at Phintias with 36 warships and the remainder of the provision ships, Carthalo again arrived at Phintias with his fleet, but warned of the coming bad weather, he sailed east managed to round Cape Pachynon and ride out the storm. Junius burned the 13 damaged ships and sailed for Syracuse. The Roman fleet encountered the storm off Camarina, losing all but two ships. The consul was among the survivors, and he managed to sail to Lilybaeum safely.

== Aftermath ==
Lucius Junius set about his duties after taking command at Lilybaeum. He arranged to have supplies for the army brought using land routes from Syracuse, then occupied the city of Eryx and fortified a place called Akellos, where sometime later he was captured by Carthaginians under Carthalo. Lucius Junius was freed in 247 BC during a prisoner exchange; he returned to Rome and committed suicide to avoid standing trial. His consular colleague, Publius Claudius Pulcher, had returned to Rome after his defeat at Drepana. The capture of Junius forced the Senate to ask Pulcher to nominate a dictator as per protocol, who arrogantly nominated a low born freedman as the dictator, who was forced to resign by the Senate before he could nominate his master of horse. This incident hastened Pulcher's trial in court for his sacrilege due to the chicken incident. He was convicted, a severe financial penalty was imposed on him and sentenced to exile, thus ending his political career.

The situation was so desperate in Sicily that the Senate now appointed Aulus Atilius Caiatinus as dictator and sent him to the island to assume command of the army. Rome had lost 384 to 600 ships in a storm in 255 BC and another 150 ships in another storm 253 BC but had launched new fleets in the following year to retain control of the sea. The Drepana defeat and loss of the fleet under Junius so demoralized the Romans that they now waited seven years before building another fleet. Carthage, now in total command of the sea, made no effort to conquer Sicily or attack Italy. Nothing is known of the subsequent activities of Adherbal, as well as Hannibal, the naval commanders who had driven the Romans from the sea, albeit with no small aid from the weather. Carthalo raided Italy in 248 BC, but the Carthaginians steadily withdrew ships from Sicily and by 242 BC, there were no fleets stationed in the island. Romans continued their siege of Drepana and Lilybaeum, and in 247 BC, Carthage sent Hamilcar Barca (Hannibal's father) to Sicily.

Hamilcar did not have a substantial navy and his army was not large enough to defeat the Romans. His brilliant campaign against the Romans imposed a heavy burden on the finances of both states, so much so that by 244 BC, Carthage was forced to request a loan of 2000 talents from Egypt, which was turned down, while by 243 BC, Roman government was bankrupt. Carthage was expanding her territory in Africa to secure tribute from the Numidians and Libyans to finance the war. Both Rome and Carthage were on their last legs economically; however, when Rome borrowed money from its private citizens to finance and train a fleet in 243 BC, Carthage's failure to train its navy led to its defeat.

== See also ==
- Drepana
- Siege of Drepana

== Bibliography ==
- Bagnall, Nigel (1999). The Punic Wars: Rome, Carthage and the Struggle for the Mediterranean. London: Pimlico. ISBN 978-0-7126-6608-4.
- The Fall of Carthage, by Adrian Goldsworthy, Cassel
- The Rise of the Roman Empire, by Polybius
- Lancel, Serge (1999). Hannibal. Blackwell Publishers. ISBN 0-631-21848-3.
- Lazenby, John Francis (1996). The First Punic War: A Military History. Stanford, California: Stanford University Press. ISBN 0-8047-2673-6. OCLC 34371250.
- Rankov, Boris (2011). "A War of Phases: Strategies and Stalemates 264–241". In Hoyos, Dexter (ed.). A Companion to the Punic Wars. Oxford: Wiley-Blackwell. ISBN 978-1-405-17600-2.
- Casson, Lionel (1991). The Ancient Mariners. Princeton, New Jersey: Princeton University Press. ISBN 0-691-06836-4.
- Bagnall, Nigel (1990). The Punic Wars. New York, NY: Saint Martin’s Press. ISBN 0-312-34214-4.
