= 249 BC =

249 BC in various calendars
Gregorian calendar	249 BC; CCXLIX BC
Ab urbe condita	505
Ancient Egypt era	XXXIII dynasty, 75
Pharaoh	Ptolemy II Philadelphus, 35
Ancient Greek Olympiad (summer)	132nd Olympiad, year 4
Assyrian calendar	4502
Balinese saka calendar	N/A
Bengali calendar	−842 – −841
Berber calendar	702
Buddhist calendar	296
Burmese calendar	−886
Byzantine calendar	5260–5261
Chinese calendar	辛亥年 (Metal Pig); 2449 or 2242 — to — 壬子年 (Water Rat); 2450 or 2243
Coptic calendar	−532 – −531
Discordian calendar	918
Ethiopian calendar	−256 – −255
Hebrew calendar	3512–3513
- Hindu calendars
Vikram Samvat	−192 – −191
Shaka Samvat	N/A
Kali Yuga	2852–2853
Holocene calendar	9752
Iranian calendar	870 BP – 869 BP
Islamic calendar	897 BH – 896 BH
Javanese calendar	N/A
Julian calendar	N/A
Korean calendar	2085
Minguo calendar	2160 before ROC 民前2160年
Nanakshahi calendar	−1716
Seleucid era	63/64 AG
Thai solar calendar	294–295
Tibetan calendar	阴金猪年 (female Iron-Pig) −122 or −503 or −1275 — to — 阳水鼠年 (male Water-Rat) −121 or −502 or −1274

Year 249 BC was a year of the pre-Julian Roman calendar. At the time it was known as the Year of the Consulship of Pulcher and Pullus (or, less frequently, year 505 Ab urbe condita). The denomination 249 BC for this year has been used since the early medieval period, when the Anno Domini calendar era became the prevalent method in Europe for naming years.

== Events ==
=== By place ===
==== Roman Republic ====
- The Battle of Drepana involves the Romans, under the command of the Roman consul Publius Claudius Pulcher, attacking the Carthaginian fleet, under the command of Adherbal, in the harbour of Drepanum (modern Trapani, Sicily). The Romans are badly defeated and lose 93 of their 123 vessels.
- Following the disastrous defeat of Roman forces at the Battle of Drepana, Publius Claudius Pulcher is fined 120,000 asses and his colleague, Lucius Junius Pullus, commits suicide. Aulus Atilius Calatinus is then elected dictator and leads an army into Sicily, becoming the first dictator to lead a Roman army outside Italy. The Roman forces at Lilybaeum are relieved, and Eryx, near Drapana, is seized. Its idol of Astarte is transported to Rome, where it becomes the Erycine Venus.

==== China ====
- The last remnants of the Zhou dynasty, having rebelled against the State of Qin, are defeated by Prime Minister Lü Buwei.
- The Qin general Meng Ao seizes the Taiyuan region from the State of Zhao.
- King Kaolie of Chu annexes the State of Lu.

== Deaths ==
- King Hui of Zhou, last Zhou claimant to the throne of China, is executed.
