= Carthalo =

Carthaginian commander during the Second Punic War, officer of Hannibal

Carthalo (Punic: 𐤒𐤓𐤕𐤇𐤋𐤑, romanized: QRTḤLṢ, "Saved by Melqart"; Ancient Greek: Καρθάλων, romanized: Karthálōn; died around 209 BC) was an officer in Hannibal's army during the Second Punic War.

== Life ==
Carthalo led the Numidian cavalry in a successful skirmish against Rome. In 249, he assisted Adherbal during an attempt by the Romans headed by Publius Claudius Pulcher to take Drepana from the sea. He arrived in the city prior to the siege with 70 quinqueremes. 249 BC saw Roman defeats at Drepana and Phintias. His contribution was recognized for helping force the Romans to abandon the siege despite the superiority of the invading army.

Following the Battle of Cannae, Hannibal sent Carthalo to Rome as a peace envoy. His delegation included a number of Roman prisoners whom the Carthaginians hoped to ransom. However, the newly appointed Roman dictator Marcus Junius Pera sent a messenger to intercept Carthalo's delegation, telling them to leave by nightfall.

In 209 BC, Carthalo was serving as garrison commander of Tarentum, which had fallen to Hannibal three years earlier, when Fabius Maximus led a Roman force to retake the settlement. In the ensuing battle, when defeat seemed inevitable, Carthalo laid down his arms with the intention of surrendering to Fabius but was killed before he could make contact.

== See also ==
- Melqart, the Canaanite deity
- Battle of Drepana
