= Garam =

Garam may refer to:

== Name ==
- Garam (Yi Hyeon-il) (born 1624), a scholar-official of the Joseon period of Korea
- Sami Garam (born 1967), Finnish cook and writer, son of Károly
- Jung Ga-ram (born 1993), South Korean male actor known for his role in Love Alarm
- Yoon Bit-garam (born 1990), South Korean football player
- Kim Ga-ram, former member of Le Sserafim.

== Places ==
- Garam, Republic of Buryatia, a rural locality (a settlement) in Yeravninsky District, Republic of Buryatia, Russia
- Garam, Hungarian name of river Hron, part of river Danube

== Other uses ==
- Garam (film), a 2016 Telugu film
- Garam masala, meaning "hot" + "spice mixture": a South Asian spice mixture

== See also ==
- Garum, ancient Mediterranean sauce
- Garam Masala (disambiguation)
