= Gisco (died 239 BC) =

Ancient Carthaginian general active 241–239 BC

- Died: 239 BC; Near Utica, Tunisia
- Military career
- Allegiance: Carthaginian Republic
- Rank: General
- Conflicts: First Punic War: Siege of Lilybaeum; Mercenary War

Gisco was a Carthaginian general who served during the closing years of the First Punic War (264–239 BCE) and took a leading part in the events which sparked the Mercenary War. He was a citizen of the city state of Carthage, which was located in what is now Tunisia. His date of birth and age at death are both unknown, as are his activities prior to his rise to prominence towards the end of the First Punic War.

When the Carthaginians conceded defeat in the war in 241 BCE, Gisco was commander of the major base of Lilybaeum (modern Marsala) on Sicily, subordinate to Hamilcar Barca, the overall Carthaginian commander on the island. On being ordered to negotiate a peace treaty, Hamilcar retired to Carthage in a rage, leaving Gisco, as the next most senior commander, in charge of negotiations with the Romans. These resulted in the Treaty of Lutatius, which ended the war. By this time the troops whom he had sent from Sicily to Africa to be repatriated were in a mutinous state over a pay dispute, and Gisco, who had a good reputation with them, was hastily recalled to deal with the situation. The discontent seemed to have abated when, for some unknown reason, discipline broke down. Several soldiers insisted that no deal with Carthage was acceptable, a riot broke out and dissenters were stoned to death. Gisco and his staff were taken prisoner and his treasury was seized.

He was held prisoner for two years, during which the rebels suffered several defeats. After a large force of rebels deserted to the Carthaginians in 239 BCE and were well received, the rebel leaders feared the disintegration of their army; they were aware that such generous terms would not be extended to them personally. To remove the possibility of any goodwill between the sides, they had Gisco and 700 other Carthaginian prisoners tortured to death.

== Life ==
Gisco, also known as Gesco and Gesgo, was a citizen of the city state of Carthage, which was located in what is now Tunisia. By the mid-3rd century BCE it had come to dominate much of the coastal regions of North Africa, southern Spain, the Balearic Islands, Corsica, Sardinia, and the western half of Sicily in a military and commercial empire. Gisco's date of birth and age at death are both unknown, as are his activities prior to his rise to prominence towards the end of the First Punic War.

=== First Punic War ===
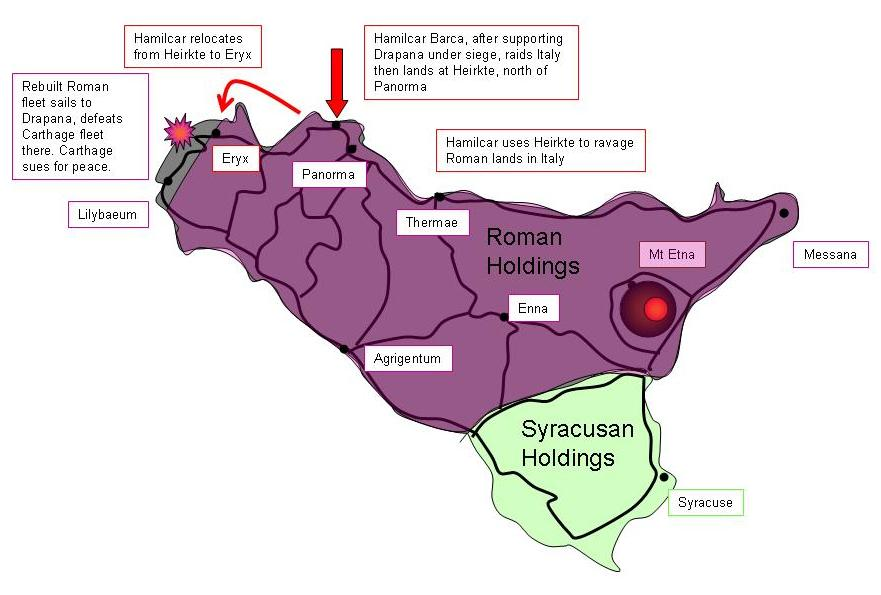
Roman attacks 250–249 BC Roman territory or advances (arrows) Syracusan territory Carthaginian territory

The First Punic War began in 264 BCE and was fought between Carthage and Rome, the two main powers of the western Mediterranean in the 3rd century BCE. For 23 years, in the longest continuous conflict and greatest naval war of antiquity, the two powers struggled for supremacy, primarily on the Mediterranean island of Sicily and its surrounding waters. In 250 BCE Carthage's main Sicilian stronghold, Lilybaeum (modern Marsala), was besieged from the land. Determined attempts by the Romans to storm the city were repelled. By 248 BCE the Carthaginians held only two cities on Sicily: Lilybaeum and Drepana; these were well fortified and situated on the west coast, where they could be supplied and reinforced by sea, without the Romans being able to use their superior army to interfere.

After more than 20 years of war, both states were financially exhausted and suffering from a large drop in male citizens of fighting age. Evidence of Carthage's financial situation includes their request for a 2,000-talent loan (Note: 2,000 talents was approximately 52,000 kg (51 LT) of silver.) from Ptolemaic Egypt, which was refused. Rome was also close to bankruptcy and the number of adult male citizens, who provided the manpower for the navy and the legions, had declined by 17 percent since the start of the war. The classicist Adrian Goldsworthy describes Roman manpower losses as "appalling". When Hamilcar Barca took command of the Carthaginians on Sicily in 247 BCE he was only given a small army and the Carthaginian fleet was gradually withdrawn.

In late 243 BCE, realizing they would not capture Drepana and Lilybaeum unless they could extend their blockade to the sea, the Roman Senate decided to build a new fleet. With the state's coffers exhausted, the Senate approached Rome's wealthiest citizens for loans to finance the construction of one ship each, repayable from the reparations to be imposed on Carthage once the war was won. The result was a fleet of approximately 200 quinqueremes, built, equipped, and crewed at private expense. The Carthaginians raised a larger fleet which they intended to use to run supplies into Sicily. It was intercepted by the Roman fleet under Gaius Lutatius Catulus and Quintus Valerius Falto, and in the hard-fought battle of the Aegates Islands, the better-trained Romans defeated the undermanned and ill-trained Carthaginian fleet. After achieving this decisive victory, the Romans continued their land operations in Sicily against Lilybaeum and Drepana.

Gisco is first recorded at this time, as the commander of Lilybaeum. Its commander during the initial years of the siege was Himilco. When he was replaced by Gisco is not known. During Gisco's tenure the military situation was quiet around Lilybaeum; the Romans had accepted that they could not storm the city, and had constructed strong earth and timber walls to prevent Carthaginian sorties, but which would also greatly hamper any further assaults on the city. The focus of the fighting moved to the north.

==== Treaty of Lutatius ====
With their relief effort defeated, the Carthaginian Senate was reluctant to allocate the resources necessary to have another fleet built and manned. In any case, it was probable their Carthaginian garrisons would be starved into surrender before that could be done. Instead, it ordered Hamilcar to negotiate a peace treaty with the Romans, on whatever terms he could obtain. After receiving the order to make peace, Hamilcar refused, claiming the surrender was unnecessary. It is possible that for political and prestige reasons Hamilcar did not wish to be associated with the treaty which formalised Carthage's defeat in the 23-year-long war. As the next most senior Carthaginian on the island, it was left to Gisco to broker the peace terms.

Gisco opened discussions with Catulus, the victor of the Aegates, who now commanded the Roman forces in Sicily. It was the long-standing Roman procedure to appoint two men each year, known as consuls, to each lead an army. Catulus's term was near its end and his replacement could be expected to arrive on Sicily shortly. This caused him to be eager to conclude a definitive peace and thus claim the credit for bringing the lengthy war to a close. Gisco and Catulus agreed that Carthage would hand over what it still held of Sicily; release all Roman prisoners without ransom, although ransom would need to be paid to secure the release of prisoners held by the Romans; and pay an indemnity of 2,200 talents of silver – 57,000 kilograms (56 long tons) – over 20 years. These terms were referred to Rome for ratification, where they were rejected. A commission of ten was sent to settle the matter. As the commission was chaired by Catulus's brother Quintus Lutatius Cerco, who was to succeed him as consul, this may have been largely a negotiating ploy. Gisco rapidly agreed further concessions with the commission: several islands close to Sicily would also be handed over; (Note: Probably the Lipari and Aegades Islands.) the indemnity was increased to 3,200 talents, (Note: 3,200 talents was approximately 82,000 kg (81 LT) of silver.) with the additional 1,000 talents payable immediately and the time allowed to pay the balance reduced to 10 years. There were other minor clauses in the final agreement, which was formalised in the Treaty of Lutatius. Hamilcar immediately handed over command on Sicily to Gisco, and it was left to him to formally inform Carthage of what had been agreed.

=== Mercenary War ===
The Carthaginian forces on Sicily evacuated the rest of the island and concentrated in Lilybaeum. The withdrawal of these 20,000 men from Sicily was in the hands of Gisco. Few, if any, of them would have been Carthaginians; in most circumstances Carthage recruited foreigners to make up its army. Many would be from North Africa, with others from Spain, Gaul, Italy, Greece, Sicily and the Balearic Islands. Not wishing the freshly idle soldiers to combine for purposes of their own, Gisco split the army into small detachments based on their regions of origin. He sent these back to Carthage one at a time. He anticipated they would be promptly paid the several years back pay they were owed and hurried on their way home. The Carthaginian authorities decided to instead wait until all of the troops had arrived and then attempt to negotiate a settlement at a lower rate. Meanwhile, as each group arrived it was billeted inside the city of Carthage, where the advantages of civilisation were appreciated to the full after up to ten years under siege. So much so, that before the full 20,000 had arrived they were relocated to Sicca Veneria (modern El Kef) 180 km (110 mi) away, even though a significant portion of their arrears had to be paid before they would go.

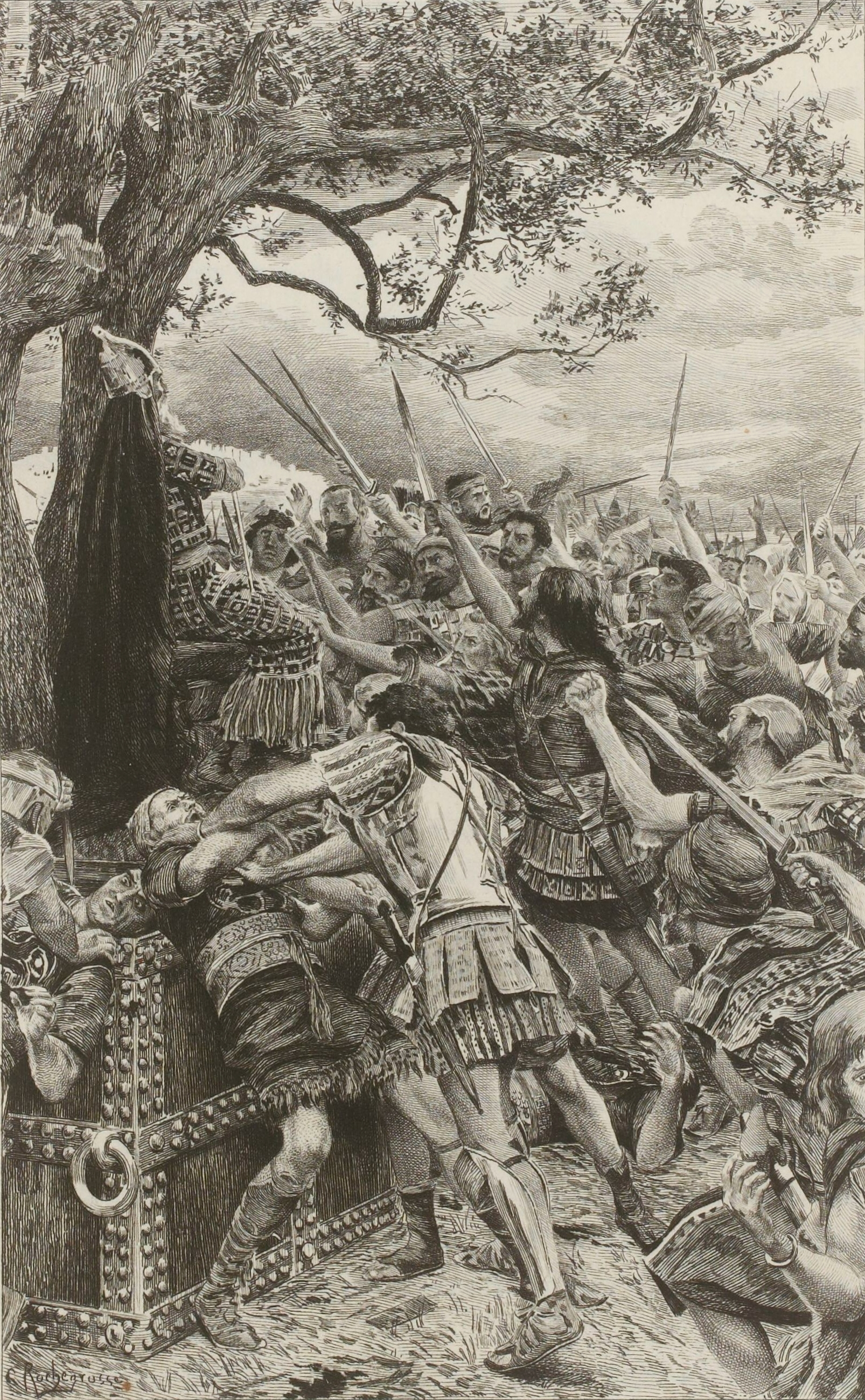
The soldiers mutiny and attack Gisco as well as his staff, as envisaged by Georges Rochegrosse and Eugène-André Champollion

Freed of their long period of military discipline and with nothing to do, the men grumbled among themselves and refused all attempts by the Carthaginians to pay them less than the full amount due. Frustrated by the Carthaginian negotiators' attempts to haggle, all 20,000 troops marched to Tunis, 16 km (10 mi) from Carthage. Panicking, the Senate agreed to payment in full. The mutinous troops responded by demanding even more. Gisco, who had a good reputation with the army, was brought over from Sicily in late 241 BCE and despatched to the camp with enough money to pay most of what was owed. He started to disburse this, with promises the balance would be paid as soon as it could be raised. The discontent seemed to have abated when, for some unknown reason, discipline broke down. Several soldiers insisted that no deal with Carthage was acceptable, a riot broke out, dissenters were stoned to death, Gisco and his staff were taken prisoner and his treasury was seized. Spendius, an escaped Roman slave who faced death by torture if he were recaptured, and Matho, a Berber dissatisfied with Carthage's attitude towards tax raising from its African possessions, were declared generals. The news of a formed, experienced, anti-Carthaginian army in the heart of its territory spread rapidly and many cities and towns rose in rebellion. Provisions, money and reinforcements poured in; an additional 70,000 men according to Polybius. The pay dispute had become a full-scale revolt threatening Carthage's existence as a state.

War-weary Carthage fared poorly in the initial engagements of the war. Its army was commanded by Hanno; the military historian Nigel Bagnall wrote of his "incompetence as a field commander". At some point during 240 BC the Carthaginians raised another, smaller, force, of approximately 10,000, which was placed under the command of Hamilcar, who had commanded the Carthaginian forces on Sicily for the last six years of the First Punic War. He was faced by a rebel force of 25,000 men commanded by Spendius, who still held Gisco and his staff as prisoners. Hamilcar defeated this army at the Battle of the Bagradas River.

While Hanno manoeuvred against Matho to the north near Hippo (modern Bizerte), Hamilcar confronted various towns and cities which had gone over to the rebels, bringing them back to Carthaginian allegiance with varying mixtures of diplomacy and force. He was shadowed by a superior-sized rebel force, which kept to rough ground for fear of Hamilcar's cavalry and elephants, and harried his foragers and scouts. Some time in 239 BCE, Hamilcar moved his force into the mountains south west of Utica in an attempt to bring the rebels to battle, but was surrounded. The Carthaginians were saved from destruction only when a Numidian leader, Naravas, who had served with and admired Hamilcar in Sicily, swapped sides with his 2,000 cavalry. This proved disastrous for the rebels, and in the resulting battle they lost 10,000 killed and 4,000 captured.

=== Death ===
Since leaving Carthage, Hamilcar had treated rebels he had captured well and offered them a choice of joining his army or free passage home. He made the same offer to the 4,000 captives from the recent battle. The rebel leaders perceived this generous treatment as the motivation behind Navaras's defection and feared the disintegration of their army; they were aware such generous terms would not be extended to them personally. To remove the possibility of any goodwill between the sides, they had Gisco and 700 other Carthaginian prisoners tortured to death: they had their hands cut off, were castrated, had their legs broken and were thrown into a pit and buried alive.

Hamilcar in retaliation killed his 4,000 prisoners. From this point, neither side showed any mercy, and the unusual ferocity of the fighting caused Polybius to term it the "Truceless War". Any further prisoners taken by the Carthaginians were trampled to death by elephants, while the rebels crucified numerous captured Carthaginians. In 238 BC at the Battle of the Saw, Hamilcar took Spendius and nine of his principal lieutenants prisoner during a parley and in turn had them crucified.

== Notes, citations and sources ==
=== Sources ===
- Bagnall, Nigel (1999). The Punic Wars: Rome, Carthage and the Struggle for the Mediterranean. London: Pimlico. ISBN 978-0-7126-6608-4.
- Bringmann, Klaus (2007). A History of the Roman Republic. Cambridge: Polity Press. ISBN 978-0-7456-3370-1.
- Eckstein, Arthur (2017). "The First Punic War and After, 264-237BC". The First Punic War and After, 264–237 BC. Chichester, West Sussex: Wiley Online Library. pp. 1–14. doi:10.1002/9781119099000.wbabat0270. ISBN 9781405186452.
- Goldsworthy, Adrian (2006). The Fall of Carthage: The Punic Wars 265–146 BC. London: Phoenix. ISBN 978-0-304-36642-2.
- Hoyos, Dexter (2000). "Towards a Chronology of the 'Truceless War', 241–237 B. C.". Rheinisches Museum für Philologie. 143 (3/4): 369–380. JSTOR 41234468.
- Hoyos, Dexter (2007). Truceless War: Carthage's Fight for Survival, 241 to 237 BC. Leiden; Boston: Brill. ISBN 978-90-474-2192-4.
- Koon, Sam (2015) [2011]. "Phalanx and Legion: the "Face" of Punic War Battle". In Hoyos, Dexter (ed.). A Companion to the Punic Wars. Chichester, West Sussex: John Wiley. pp. 77–94. ISBN 978-1-1190-2550-4.
- Lazenby, John (1996). The First Punic War: A Military History. Stanford, California: Stanford University Press. ISBN 978-0-8047-2673-3.
- Miles, Richard (2011). Carthage Must be Destroyed. London: Penguin. ISBN 978-0-14-101809-6.
- Scullard, H.H. (2006) [1989]. "Carthage and Rome". In Walbank, F. W.; Astin, A. E.; Frederiksen, M. W. & Ogilvie, R. M. (eds.). Cambridge Ancient History: Volume 7, Part 2, 2nd Edition. Cambridge: Cambridge University Press. pp. 486–569. ISBN 0-521-23446-8.
