= Himilco (disambiguation) =

Himilco (fl. 5th century BCE), sometimes referred to as Himilco the Navigator, was a Carthaginian sailor.

Himilco may also refer to:

- Himilco (general) (died c. 396 BCE), Carthaginian soldier at the Battle of Messene
- Himilco (Punic War) (fl. c. 250 BCE), Carthaginian soldier, Alexon's commanding officer during the siege of Lilybaeum
- Himilco (fl. 3rd century BC) (died c.212 BC), Carthaginian soldier, general in Sicily during the Second Punic War
