= Lucius Manlius Vulso Longus =

Roman general and statesman

Lucius Manlius Vulso Longus was a Roman general and statesman, who served as consul of the Roman Republic in 256 and 250 BC. He is remembered for his military successes; his military achievements, especially the Battle of Cape Ecnomus, which significantly contributed to the victory of the Romans in the First Punic War.

== Career ==
During Lucius’ mature life, he ran for the consulate several times, succeeding twice. On both occasions he ended up leading military expeditions. The term for being consul was one year. Two consuls ruled at a time and one could serve up to two terms. It was the consuls’ job to govern provinces, lead armies in major wars, and run the Senate and assemblies.

He ran in 259 BC, but lost to Lucius Cornelius Scipio. After this, he successfully ran in 256 and 250 BC. In 256, he ruled with Marcus Atilius Regulus and in 250 with Gaius Atilius Regulus. In 256, Lucius and Marcus Atilius Regulus sailed to Africa during the First Punic War to fight Carthage—see Battle of Cape Ecnomus. Rome had prepared a large fleet of 330 ships and 140,000 men (100,000 crew and 40,000 soldiers), Carthage had a slightly larger fleet of 350 ships and 150,000 men. The Romans sailed in battle formation with three squadrons. Two of the squadrons, commanded by the consuls Marcus Atilius Regulus and Lucius Manlius Vulso Longus, led the way. The other squadron was in the back protecting the horse-transport ships that were between them. They sailed in a triangular shape because of the strong base that was easy to support during battle and also difficult to break up.

The Carthaginians were positioned in a long horizontal line with Hamilcar in the center and two slightly advanced sides. The two Carthaginian flanks advanced, which left the main line alone. This line was immediately targeted because of its vulnerability. The first two squadrons were the main ships to fight the center of the Carthaginian fleet. Since the soldiers were fighting under both consuls, who were taking part in the battle in person, they felt even more encouraged to fight with their entire strength and defeated the Carthaginians after an extensive fight. After, the squadrons went to relieve the back of the fleet. Vulso's squadron went after the Carthaginian left wing that was attacking the transport ships, while Regulus attacked Hanno. Saving these transport ships was essential to the Romans' later victories at Aspis because these ships contained horses for the cavalry and extra food and supplies which were necessary for fighting on land. After the battle, about half of Carthage's fleet had been captured or sunk. Both consuls then landed in Africa to quickly regroup and then sailed to Cape Bon, where they landed near Aspis. Here, they surrounded the city and set up a garrison. Then the consuls sent the troops to plunder the area, which was very plentiful. They herded cattle, burned houses of the rich, captured slaves, and destroyed the city's defenses. In the meantime, the Senate instructed one consul to come back to Rome with the navy and the other to stay with the army in Africa. Manlius ended up returning with most of the fleet and prisoners.

During his second term in 250 BC, with Gaius Atilius Regulus, Lucius faced some tough times. In the previous years, Rome had many unsuccessful military ventures. After losing 150 ships during a storm in open sea, they had almost entirely withdrawn from naval warfare. Now, limited to combat by foot, the Romans received news of losing over half of their troops in Africa after an elephant stampede. This created a great fear of elephants and the Romans would not come within 3/4 of a mile of them. After these events, the army had a general lack of spirit, which Lucius’ second term would help to raise. With Gaius Atilius, he built 50 ships, and had a huge campaign to collect sailors and organize a fleet. In the meantime, Hasdrubal, the Carthaginian, brought his troops from Lilybaeum and set up camp near Panormus in June 250 BC, where Caecilius’ army got the Carthaginians’ elephants to stampede their own army, leading to improved morale and confidence among the army. With this, the consuls were encouraged to finish the war. They sailed to Sicily with about 120 ships in the fleet. They stopped and anchored off Lilybaeum, and besieged the city. The Romans thought that if they controlled this port it would be easy to manipulate the war. The Carthaginians also understood the obvious importance of this port and put their whole force together to save the city. The Carthaginians had a force of about 10,000 mercenaries (Celts and Greeks) to protect the people from the Romans.

The Romans lost to the Carthaginians' unexpected attacks. The Carthaginians sailed 50 ships from Africa under the command of Hannibal to try to save the city by charging towards the center of the harbor. The Romans did not attempt to stop the entry of the fleet because of their sudden appearance and unfavorable winds in a foreign port. Soon after, battles between the armies broke out and eventually the Carthaginians retreated and the Romans maintained their blockade. Later, the Carthaginians defeated the Romans for good when they set fire to the locations where the Romans had taken over. Even after the great losses that the Romans suffered at Lilybaeum, back in Rome, Lucius Manlius was quickly able to recruit about 10,000 sailors and sent them to Sicily, where they planned to attack Drepana, which was a port town about 24 miles north of Lilybaeum. The Roman attempt during the second consulship of Lucius Manlius Vulso ultimately failed, but it shows his leadership abilities through his capacity to keep recruiting sailors, even after a serious loss. With these abilities, he was able to help Rome stay on the path to winning the First Punic War.

== Death ==
Lucius Manlius Vulso Longus died in 216 BC. Nothing is known about how he died. Since he died in 216 BC, this means that he lived for around 83 years, since one had to be around 40 years old to run for consul and the first time he ran was in 259 BC. It is probable that he died from natural causes, since he was around 83 years old, which was very old for someone living in Ancient Rome. Assuming this is correct, his birth would be somewhere around 300 BC.

== Analysis of contributions ==
Throughout the years, Lucius Manlius has generally been accepted as yet another consul who helped in military victories. In the Battle of Cape Ecnomus, his command skills were essential in saving the transport ships, which allowed the Romans to pursue a follow-up attack at Aspis. In his second term, he brought the army into an improved and positive state of mind through building a new fleet and recruiting many sailors, even after the losses at Lilybaeum.

== Bibliography ==
- Broughton, Robert S. "Candidates Defeated in Roman Elections." Transactions of the American Philosophical Society 81 (1991).
- Dupuy, Trevor N. Harper Encyclopedia of Military Biography. Chicago: Book Sales, Incorporated, 1995.
- Frank, Tenney. "Notes on Plautus." The American Journal of Philology 58 (1937).
- Goldsworthy, Adrian. The Punic Wars. London: Cassell, 2000.
- Salowey, Christina A. Great Lives from History the Ancient World. Pasadena, CA: Salem, 2004.
- Walbank, F. W. The Rise of the Roman Empire. Trans. Ian Scott-Kilvert. New York: Penguin Classics, 1979.

Preceded by Gaius Atilius Regulus; Gnaeus Cornelius Blasio	Roman consul 256 BC with Quintus Caedicius; Marcus Atilius Regulus (suffect)	Succeeded by Servius Fulvius Paetinus Nobilior; Marcus Aemilius Paullus
Preceded by Lucius Caecilius Metellus; Gaius Furius Pacilus	Roman consul II; 250 BC with Gaius Atilius Regulus	Succeeded by Publius Claudius Pulcher; Lucius Junius Pullus
