= Masala (surname) =

Masala is an Italian surname, specifically from Sardinia. Notable people with the name include:

- Carlo Masala (born 1968), German political scientist
- Daniele Masala (born 1955), Italian pentathlete
- Stéphane Masala (born 1976), French football player and manager

== See also ==
- Masala (disambiguation)
