= Marsala =

Marsala may refer to:

- Marsala, Sicily, an Italian city on the island of Sicily
- Marsala wine
  - Chicken marsala, an Italian-American dish made with the wine
- Marsala Ship, a warship wreck in the harbor of Sicily
- Marsala, fictional character in the animated series Exosquad
- Marsala (surname)
- S.S.D. Marsala Calcio, an Italian football club

== See also ==
- Masala (disambiguation)
