= Masala =

Masala, Massala or MASALA may refer to:

== Spice ==
- Masala (spice), any of the many spice mixes used in the cuisine of the Indian subcontinent
  - Masala chai, a flavored tea beverage
  - Masala dabba, container to store spices
  - Masala dosa, an Indian dish
  - Masala incense, Indian incense using a spice mix
  - Masala omelette, an Indian omelette
  - Masala puri, an Indian snack
  - Garam masala, a hot Indian spice mix
  - Curry powder, a ready-made ingredient first sold by Indian merchants to British traders
  - Chicken tikka masala, a dish consisting of roasted marinated chicken pieces in a spiced curry sauce
  - Paneer tikka masala, a vegetarian dish consisting of grilled paneer cubes in a spiced curry sauce

== Places ==
- Masala, Kirkkonummi, a village in Finland
- Masala y Maíz, a restaurant in Mexico City

== Arts, entertainment and media ==
=== Films ===
- Masala film, an Indian filmmaking style
- Masala (1991 film), a Canadian drama film
- Masala (2012 film), a Marathi film
- Masala (2013 film), a Telugu film

=== Television ===
- Masala (TV series), a Singapore-Tamil soap opera
- Hum Masala, a television channel formerly called Masala TV

== People ==
- Masala (surname)

== Other uses ==
- Massachusetts Area South Asian Lambda Association, an LGBT group for people of South Asian ethnicity

== See also ==
- Marsala (disambiguation)
- Massala (disambiguation)
- Garam Masala (disambiguation)
