= Massala =

Massala may refer to:

== Places ==
- Massala, Ivory Coast, a sub-prefecture of Séguéla Department, Worodougou region, Woroba District, Ivory Coast
- Massala, Mali, a village in Mali
- Massala-Barala, a settlement in Touba Department, Bafing Region, Woroba District, Ivory Coast

== Other uses ==
- Adisu Massala, Israeli politician
- Liliane Massala, Gabonese diplomat
- Massala (moth), a genus of moths of the family Erebidae
- Massala, historic apartment building located at Indianapolis, Indiana, United States of America

== See also ==
- Masala (disambiguation)
