= Garam Masala (disambiguation) =

Garam masala is a blend of ground spices common in North Indian and other South Asian cuisines.

Garam Masala may also refer to these Indian films:

- Garam Masala (1972 film), a Hindi comedy film directed by Aspi Irani
- Garam Masala (2005 film), a Hindi comedy film directed by Priyadarshan
- Masala (2013 film), working title Garam Masala, a 2013 Telugu comedy film directed by K. Vijaya Bhaskar

== See also ==
- Garam (disambiguation)
- Masala (disambiguation)
