= Alexon =

3rd-century BC Greek mercenary

- Ἀλέξων
- Born: Achaea
- Occupation: Mercenary
- Employer: Carthage
- Known for: First Punic War

Alexon (Ancient Greek: Ἀλέξων) was an ancient Greek mercenary from Achaea, who served in the Carthaginian garrison at Lilybaeum while it was besieged by the Romans in 250 BC, during the First Punic War. During the siege, some of the Gallic mercenaries engaged in the service of the Carthaginians started planning to betray their Carthaginian commanders. Alexon, who had also saved the town of Agrigentum from a similar attempt by treacherous mercenaries, gave information of the plot to the Carthaginian commander Himilco. Alexon then assisted Himilco to persuade the remaining mercenaries to stay loyal to their commanders.
