= Lucius Junius Pullus =

Roman politician and general, consul in 249 BCE

Lucius Junius (C. f. C. n.) Pullus (died 249 or 248 BCE) was a politician and general of the Roman Republic. He was consul in 249 BCE together with Publius Claudius Pulcher. He and his consular colleague fought in the ongoing First Punic War.

After the disastrous defeat of Publius Claudius Pulcher's fleet at the Battle of Drepana, where his fleet was almost completely destroyed by the Carthaginian navy, Pulcher was recalled to Rome and fined for his incompetence. Subsequently, Pullus' own fleet was also destroyed by a storm and harassment by Carthaginian vessels. According to the chronicles, his dismay at losing the fleet led Lucius Junius Pullus to take his own life rather than returning to Rome in shame as his colleague had done.

== See also ==
- First Punic War
- Siege of Lilybaeum (250 BC)

Political offices
Preceded by Gaius Atilius Regulus; Lucius Manlius Vulso Longus	Consul of Rome together with Publius Claudius Pulcher; 249 BC	Succeeded by Gaius Aurelius Cotta; Publius Servilius Geminus
