= Yi Hyeon-il =

- Hangul: 이현일
- Hanja: 李玄逸
- RR: I Hyeonil
- MR: I Hyŏnil

Yi Hyeon-il (Korean: 이현일; Hanja: 李玄逸; 1627–1704) was a scholar-official during the Joseon period of Korea. His pen name was Ikseung (익승; 翼昇), his nickname was Garam (갈암; 葛庵), and his posthumous name was Mungyeong (문경; 文敬). He led the Toegye school during the reign of King Sukjong and was a prominent Namin.

Due to political turmoil and factional strife, he endured a succession of dismissals and reinstatements, even after his death. For this reason, the publication of his collected papers, the GaramJib, was repeatedly delayed and only occurred in the 1900s.

== Sources ==
- Doopedia: "이현일 (李玄逸)" [Yi Hyeon-il]. Doosan Encyclopedia.
- AKS: "이현일 (李玄逸)" [Yi Hyeon-il]. Academy of Korean Studies.
