= Siege of Drepana =

Siege of the First Punic War lasting from 249 to 241 BCE

Coordinates: 38.0167°N 12.5167°E

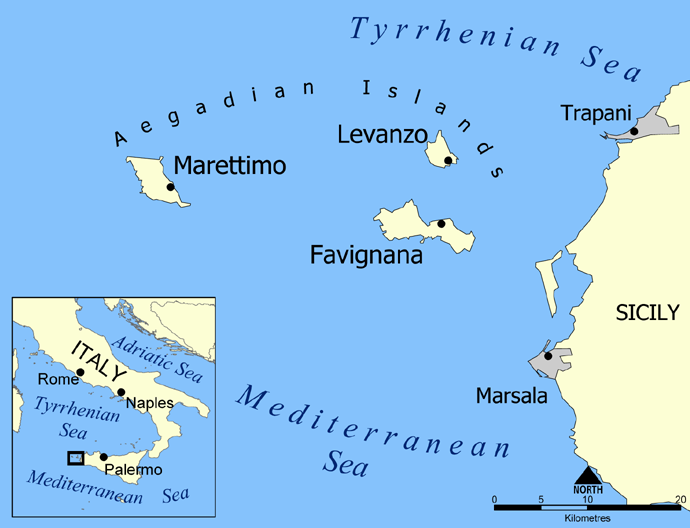
Location of Drepana (today Trapani) and the Aegadian Islands

The siege of Drepana took place from about 249 to 241 BC during the First Punic War.

== Background ==
Drepana (today's Trapani) and Lilybaeum (today's Marsala) were two Carthaginian naval strongholds at the western end of Sicily that came under prolonged Roman attack.

== Siege ==
During the beginning of the siege, the naval victory of the Carthaginians over the Roman Republic at the Battle of Drepana destroyed the Roman naval blockade and allowed the Carthaginians to provide support for the two besieged ports via the sea. The access by land to Drepana was limited by the presence of Mount Eryx. So land access to Drepana was contested by both armies with the Romans eventually prevailing.

In 241 BC, the Romans under Gaius Lutatius Catulus had rebuilt their fleet and intensified their siege of Drepana forcing the Carthaginians to send a fleet to support the town. The fleet from Carthage was intercepted and destroyed by the newly built Roman fleet during the Battle of the Aegates Islands, effectively ending the First Punic War.
