= Gaius Atilius Regulus (consul 257 BC) =

3rd-century BC Roman politician and general

Gaius Atilius Regulus (fl. 257–250 BC) was a Roman Republican consul who twice held the consulship in the middle of the 3rd century (257, 250) BC. He seems not to be closely related to M. Atilius M.f L.n. Regulus, for the grandfather of Regulus Serranus was named Marcus. Most likely the grandfathers were brothers and the successive consuls of 257 and 256 were second cousins.

== Career ==
Gaius Atilius M.f. M.n Regulus Serranus was consul for the first time in 257 BC, with the patrician Gnaeus Cornelius Blasio, and prosecuted the First Punic War against the Carthaginians. He defeated the Carthaginian fleet off the Liparaean islands, though not without considerable loss. He then obtained possession of the islands of Lipara and Melite, which he laid waste with fire and sword. On his return to Rome, he received the honour of a naval triumph.

Atilius was consul a second time in 250, with his patrician colleague being Lucius Manlius Vulso. Legend says he was plowing in the field when the delegation from Rome informed him that he had been re-elected consul (Aen. 6.844). In this year, the Romans gained a brilliant victory at Panormus, under the proconsul Lucius Caecilius Metellus. Thinking that the time had now come to bring the war to a conclusion, they sent both consuls to Sicily with an army of four legions and two hundred ships. Regulus and his colleague undertook the siege of Lilybaeum, the most important Carthaginian possession in Sicily, but they were foiled in their attempts to carry the place by storm and, after losing a great number of men, were obliged to turn the siege into a blockade.

== Sources ==
- William Smith, Dictionary of Greek and Roman Biography and Mythology, 1870, "G. Atilius M. f. M. n. Regulus Serranus"^{[usurped]}
- William Smith, Dictionary of Greek and Roman Biography and Mythology, 1870, "Serranus"^{[usurped]}

Political offices
Preceded by Aulus Atilius Caiatinus; Gaius Sulpicius Paterculus	Roman consul 257 BC with Gnaeus Cornelius Blasio	Succeeded by Lucius Manlius Vulso Longus; Quintus Caedicius
Preceded by Lucius Caecilius Metellus; Gaius Furius Pacilus	Roman consul II; 250 BC with Lucius Manlius Vulso Longus	Succeeded by Publius Claudius Pulcher; Lucius Junius Pullus
