= Marsala (surname) =

Marsala is an Italian surname, originated from the city of Marsala, in Sicily. Notable people with the surname include:

- Joe Marsala (1907–1978), Italian-American jazz clarinetist and songwriter
- Marty Marsala (1909–1975), American jazz trumpeter, brother of Joe
- Dan Marsala (born 1980), American singer and the lead vocalist of the rock band Story of the Year
