= Adherbal (admiral) =

Cartaginian admiral

- 𐤀𐤃𐤓𐤁𐤏𐤋
- Died: 230 BC
- Other name: Atarbas
- Military career
- Allegiance: Carthaginian Empire
- Rank: Admiral
- Conflicts: First Punic War

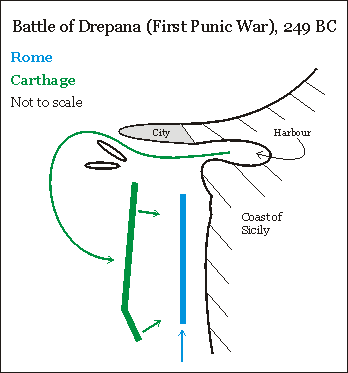
A sketch of the battle of Drepana

Adherbal (Punic: 𐤀𐤃𐤓𐤁𐤏𐤋, ʾdrbʿl; died 230 BC), also known as Atarbas (Ancient Greek: Ατάρβας, Atárbas), was the admiral of the Carthaginian fleet which battled the Romans for domination of the Mediterranean Sea during the First Punic War (264–241 BC). Polybius identified Adherbal during the Battle of Drepana as the Carthaginian commander-in-chief. He led the Carthaginian fleet to Drepana in Sicily and inflicted a crushing defeat on the Roman consul P. Claudius Pulcher during the naval battle in 249 BC.

== Battle of Drepana ==
Encouraged by previous victories, the new consul for 250 Gaius Atilius Regulus launched a campaign to attack the last Punic strongholds on the island of Sicily: Lilybaeum and Drepana. For this surprise attack, which was carried out in 249, the Romans mustered a fleet of 123 quinqueremes. Adherbal was tasked to defend Drepana with the assistance of Hannibal the Rhodian and Carthalo. In their desire for stealth, the Romans attacked at night causing them to lose their formation. Adherbal commanded the Punic fleet and immediately ordered his forces to set to sea when the straggling line of Roman galleys approached the shore by dawn. His defense cost the Romans 93 ships while Carthage lost nothing.

Adherbal's conduct during the siege was documented by historians such as Polybius and Leonardo Bruni. The latter, for instance, described the admiral delivering an oratio obliqua before his forces as he led them to meet the Romans. He would later write that Adherbal "won great praise as the man who, by virtue of his courage and skill, restored to his fellow Carthaginians their lost reputation as a sea power."
