= Himilco (commander of Lilybaeum) =

Himilco was a Carthaginian general who served as the garrison commander of Lilybaeum during the First Punic War. He served as the leader of the Carthaginian garrison in the city for much of the Roman Siege of Lilybaeum (250-241 BC), and was successful in his defence of the city against Roman attacks, on one occasion with the assistance of the mercenary leader Alexon, who foiled a plot to betray the city.

In the end, his efforts went in vain, with Carthaginian Sicily being surrendered to Rome by the Treaty of Lutatius.

Himilco's successful defence and his handling of his mercenaries has sometimes been depicted as an example of good unit cohesion created by the commander.
