= Hannibal the Rhodian =

Hannibal (Punic: 𐤇𐤍𐤁𐤏𐤋, ḥnbʿl), distinguished by Polybius as Hannibal the Rhodian (Ancient Greek: Ἀννίβας ἐπικαλούμενος Ῥόδιος, Hanníbas epikaloúmenos Rhódios), was a prominent Carthaginian who was probably nicknamed 'the Rhodian' for his skill as a sailor – the Rhodians were famously skilled seamen. During the First Punic War, when the Romans were besieging Lilybaeum, he entered the city with provisions and troops in a bold move in full view of the Romans. He was able to use the superior speed of his specially built ship to avoid the Roman fleet and gain valuable intelligence that he reported to the Carthaginian commander Adherbal and to the Carthaginian Senate. The Romans finally caught and defeated him making use of a captured Carthaginian quadrireme. The Romans used his ship to thwart subsequent Carthaginian blockade runners and modeled their subsequent naval vessels on it.

== See also ==
- Other Hannibals in Carthaginian history
