= Publius Claudius Pulcher (consul 249 BC) =

Ancient Roman politician and general

Publius Claudius Pulcher (died 249 BC or 246 BC) was a Roman politician.

== Family ==
Pulcher was the son of Appius Claudius Caecus. He was the first of the Claudii to be given the cognomen "Pulcher" ("handsome"). He was also the father of Appius Claudius Pulcher, consul in 212 BC.

After losing the Battle of Drepana, his sister Claudia was prosecuted for insulting the plebs. Whilst travelling through the streets of Rome, the path that her carriage was taking had been blocked by a crowd. She was then heard to have wished her brother would lose another battle and drown some more of the poorer citizens.

== Career ==
Curule aedile in 253 BC, as consul in 249 he was given command of the Roman fleet during the First Punic War. He lost the Battle of Drepana against the Carthaginians after ignoring a bad omen, in which 93 of his 123 ships, as well as over 20,000 sailors, were lost. According to Valerius Maximus, Suetonius and Cicero, when the sacred chickens refused to eat, Claudius threw them into the sea, reportedly saying: "Since they do not wish to eat, let them drink!" (Latin "Quia edere nolunt, bibent!", lit. 'Because they don't want to eat, they drink!'). He was recalled to Rome and ordered to appoint a dictator; his nomination of his subordinate Marcus Claudius Glicia was overruled. He was tried for incompetence and impiety, avoiding capital or corporal punishment due to double jeopardy and was instead fined 120,000 assēs, 1,000 for each ship Rome had lost in the battle against Carthage. He died soon afterwards, potentially by suicide.

Political offices
Preceded by Gaius Atilius Regulus and Lucius Manlius Vulso Longus	Consul of the Roman Republic; 249 BC with Lucius Junius Pullus	Succeeded by Gaius Aurelius Cotta and Publius Servilius Geminus
