= Drepana =

- Comune
- Drepana (modern-day Trapani)
- Location within Italy Location within Sicily
- Coordinates: 38°00′54″N 12°30′45″E
- Country: Italy
- Region: Sicily
- Province: Trapani (TP)
- Elevation: 3 m (9.8 ft)
- Time zone: UTC+1 (CET)
  - Summer (DST): UTC+2 (CEST)

Drepana (Ancient Greek: Δρέπανα) was an Elymian, Carthaginian, and Roman port in antiquity on the western coast of Sicily. It was the site of a crushing Roman defeat by the Carthaginians in 249 BC. It eventually developed into the modern Italian city of Trapani.

== Name ==
Drepana received its name from drépanon (δρέπανον), the Greek word for "sickle", because of the curving shape of its harbour. This was Latinized as Drepanum before being pluralized to its present form.

== History ==
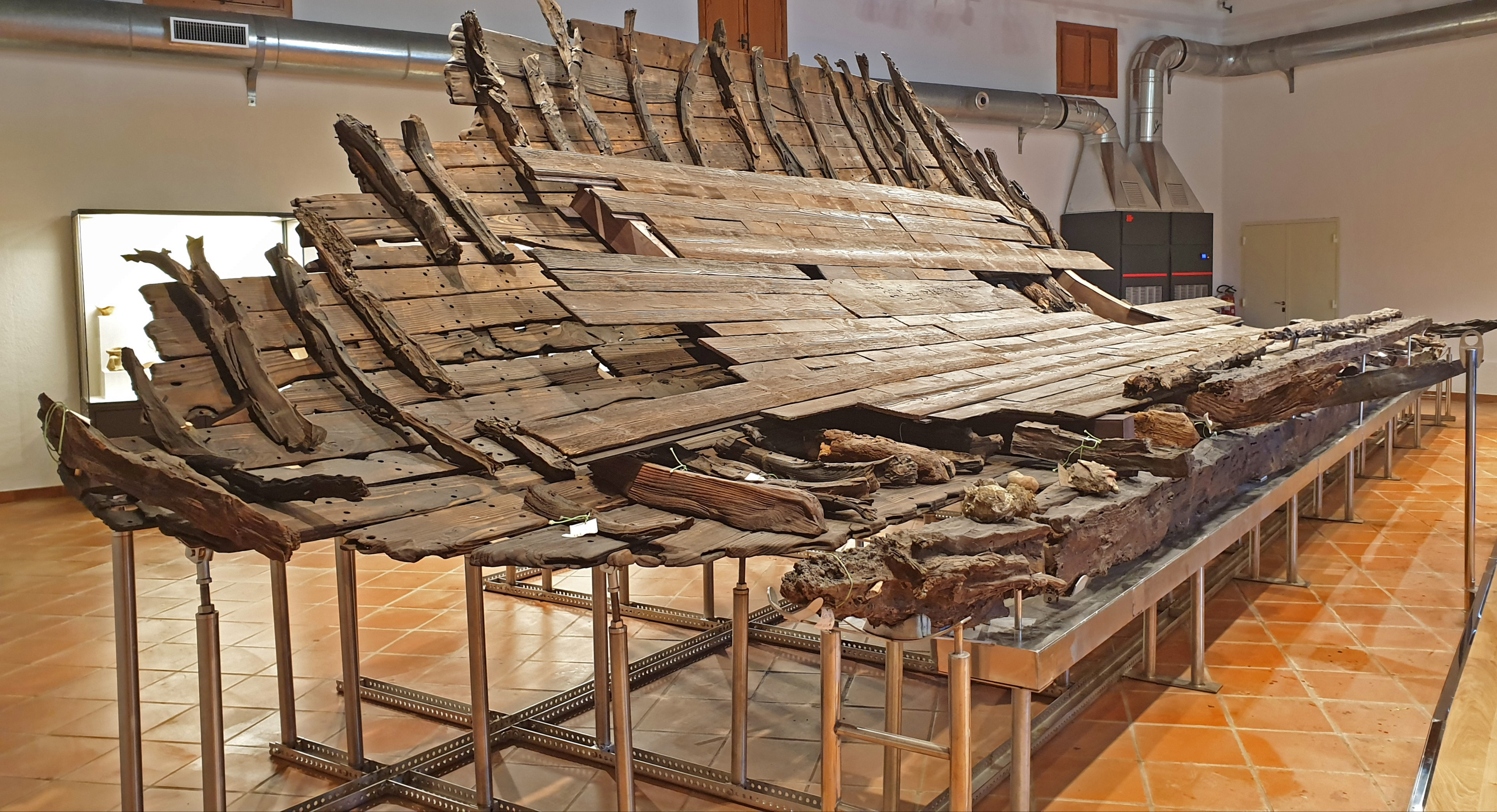
Wreck of the Roman ship found on the coast of Trapani

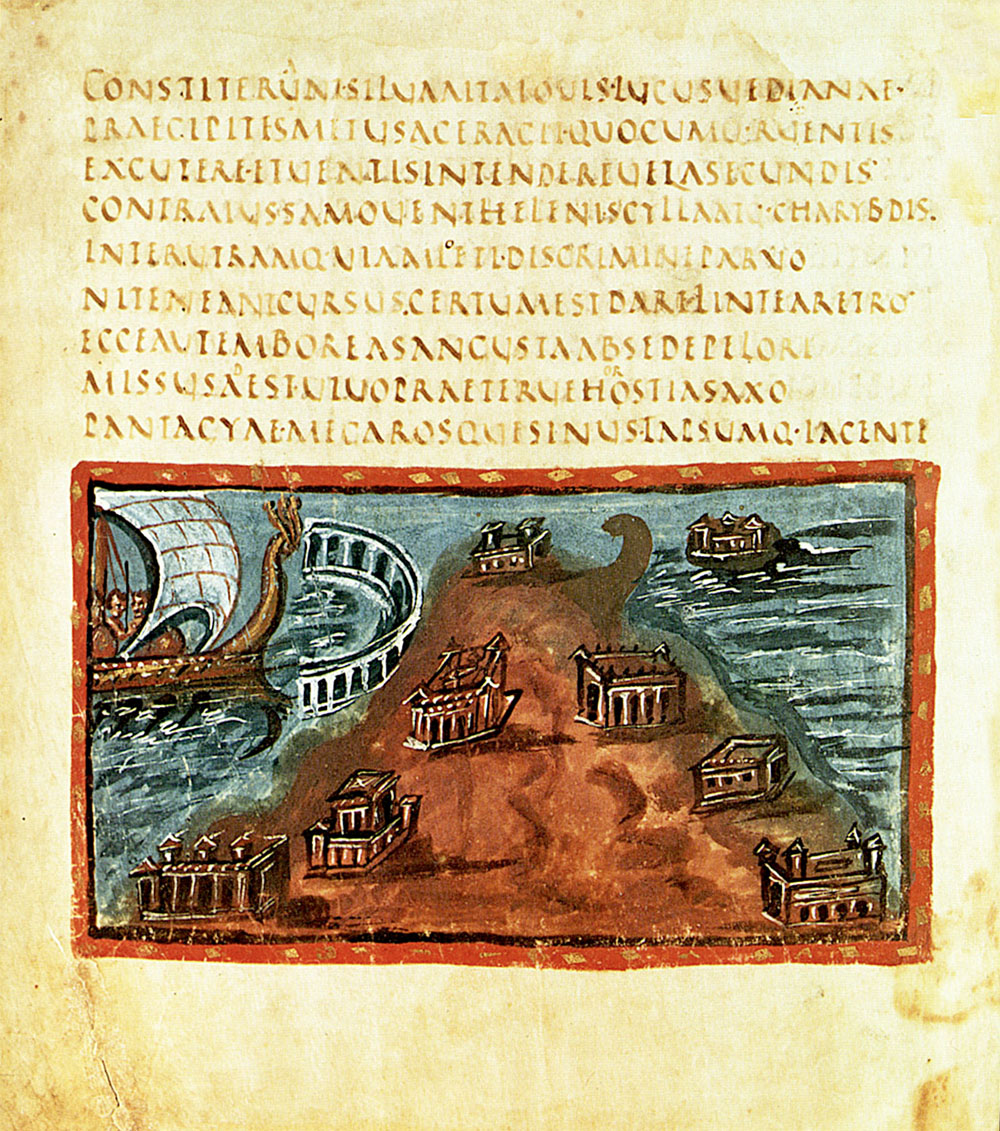
Aeneas lands at Drepanum, from the Vergilius Vaticanus (c. AD 400)

The town was founded by the Elymians to serve as the port of the nearby city of Eryx (present-day Erice), which overlooks it from Monte Erice. The city sits on a low-lying promontory jutting out into the Mediterranean Sea. The town, 40 km (25 mi) north of Lilybaeum, had been fortified by the Carthaginians, who resettled part of the population to Eryx. In 241, it was besieged by G. Lutatius Catulus, and later used as a naval base.

The town features in the Aeneid as the site of the death and funeral games of Anchises.

Carthage seized control of the city in 260 BC, subsequently making it an important naval base. The naval battle of Drepanum took place in 249 BC and was a major victory for Carthage against the Roman Republic in the First Punic War. After the Battle of the Aegates and Carthage's loss of the war, the town was ceded to Roman control in 241 BC.

It never achieved the status of a civitas in Roman times.

== See also ==
- Siege of Drepana
- Battle of Drepana
