= List of censors of the Roman Republic =

This list of Roman censors includes all holders through to its subsumption under that of Roman emperor in 22BC.

Censors were elected by the Centuriate Assembly and served as a duo. Censors were elected to take an account of all citizens and their property value before performing a rite of religious purification. Roman taxes were levied based on the censors' account, and the censors could punitively tax citizens who failed to present at the census or falsely accounted for their property.

Whilst having no right to uphold law or command in war, the office of censor was the highest honour. Unlike the office of consul, which deteriorated over the Roman Republic period, most censors were men of exceptional standing and character. Censors were known also as castigatores (English: chastisers) for their duty as the regulators of public morality. For instance, in 92 BC censors Domitius Ahenobarbus and Crassus condemned the teaching of rhetoric in Latin (as opposed to the customary Greek):

We have been informed that there are persons who have established a novel sort of instruction and that the youth gather at their school; that these people have styled themselves "Latin rhetoricians"; and that young persons idle away whole days there. […] These new practices, which do not accord with ordinary custom and the way of our ancestors, are vexatious and wayward-seeming. Therefore we make our judgment plain both to those who preside over these schools and those who have become accustomed to attending them: we do not approve.

Initially, censors were chosen exclusively from among Roman citizens of patrician birth. In 332 BC, Quintus Publilius Philo was elected the first Plebeian censor after legislation – that he introduced while dictator – providing one censor of each two must be a plebeian.

== 5th century BC ==
Before 443 BC, the consuls were responsible for the census. In 443 BC, the right to take the census was moved from the consuls to the newly established office of censor. They were chosen exclusively from Patricians.

Year	Birth	Names	Completed	Changed Senate or equites roll	Laws or regulations promulgated	Undertook public works or building
443	Patrician	Lucius Papirius Mugillanus	Yes	No	No	No
443	Patrician	Lucius Sempronius Atratinus	Yes	No	No	No
435	Patrician	Gaius Furius Paculus Fusus	Yes	No	No	Yes
435	Patrician	Marcus Geganius Macerinus	Yes	No	No	Yes
430	Patrician	Lucius Papirius (Crassus?)				
430	Patrician	Publius Pinarius (Mamercinus?)				
418	Patrician	Unknown	Unknown	No	No	No
418	Patrician	Lucius Papirius Mugillanus	Unknown	No	No	No
403	Patrician	Marcus Furius Camillus				
403	Patrician	Marcus Postumius Albinus Regillensis				

== 4th century BC ==
In 393 BC, Marcus Cornelius P.f. P. n. Maluginensis was elected suffect censor to replace the deceased censor Gaius Iulius Iullus. In 351 BC, Gaius Marcius Rutilus was elected as the first plebeian censor. According to the Lex Publilia, since 339 BC at least one of the censors had to be plebeian. In 312 BC, Appius Claudius Caecus was elected censor without being consul before.

Year	Birth	Name
393	Patrician	Lucius Papirius Cursor
393	Patrician	Gaius Iulius Iullus
393	Patrician	Marcus Cornelius P. f. P. n. Maluginensis (Suffect)
389	Patrician	Marcus Furius Fusus (?)
389	Patrician	Lucius Papirius Mugillanus (?)
380	Patrician	Spurius Postumius Albinus Regillensis
380	Patrician	Gaius Sulpicius Camerinus
378	Patrician	Spurius Servilius Priscus
378	Patrician	Quintus Cloelius Siculus
366	Patrician	Gaius Sulpicius Peticus
366	Patrician	Postumius Regillensis Albinus (?)
363	Patrician	Marcus Fabius Ambustus
363	Patrician	Lucius Furius Medullinus
351	Patrician	Gnaeus Manlius Capitolinus Imperiosus
351	Plebeian	Gaius Marcius Rutilus
340	Patrician	Lucius Cornelius Scipio
340	Plebeian	Publius Cornelius Scipio
332	Patrician	Spurius Postumius Albinus Caudinus
332	Plebeian	Quintus Publilius Philo
319	Patrician	Gaius Sulpicius Longus
319	Unknown	Unknown
318	Patrician	Lucius Papirius Crassus
318	Plebeian	Gaius Maenius
312	Patrician	Appius Claudius Caecus
312	Plebeian	Gaius Plautius Venox
307	Patrician	Marcus Valerius Maximus Corvinus
307	Plebeian	Gaius Junius Bubulcus Brutus
304	Patrician	Quintus Fabius Maximus Rullianus
304	Plebeian	Publius Decius Mus

== 3rd century BC ==
In 294 and 265 BC, Gaius Marcius Rutilus Censorinus was elected censor. This was the only time a person was elected censor twice. Marcius prevented this situation from repeating itself by originating a law stating that no one could be elected censor twice.

Year	Birth	Name
300	Patrician	Publius Sulpicius Saverrio
300	Plebeian	Publius Sempronius Sophus
294	Patrician	Publius Cornelius Arvina
294	Plebeian	Gaius Marcius Rutilus Censorinus
289	Patrician	Quintus Fabius Maximus Gurges (?)
289	Plebeian	Spurius Carvilius Maximus (?)
283	Unknown	?
283	Plebeian	Quintus Caedicius Noctua
280	Patrician	Lucius Cornelius Scipio Barbatus
280	Plebeian	Gnaeus Domitius Calvinus Maximus
275	Patrician	Quintus Aemilius Papus
275	Plebeian	Gaius Fabricius Luscinus
272	Patrician	Lucius Papirius Praetextatus
272	Plebeian	Manlius Curius Dentatus
269	Patrician	Lucius Aemilius Barbula
269	Plebeian	Quintus Marcius Philippus
265	Patrician	Gnaeus Cornelius Blasio
265	Plebeian	Gaius Marcius Rutilus Censorinus II
258	Patrician	Lucius Cornelius Scipio
258	Plebeian	Gaius Duilius
253	Patrician	Lucius Postumius Megellus
253	Plebeian	Decimus Junius Pera
252	Patrician	Manius Valerius Maximus Corvinus Messalla
252	Plebeian	Publius Sempronius Sophus
247	Patrician	Aulus Manlius Torquatus Atticus
247	Plebeian	Aulus Atilius Calatinus
241	Patrician	Marcus Fabius Buteo
241	Plebeian	Gaius Aurelius Cotta
236	Patrician	Lucius Cornelius Lentulus Caudinus
236	Plebeian	Quintus Lutatius Cerco
234	Patrician	Aulus Postumius Albinus
234	Plebeian	Gaius Atilius Bulbus
231	Patrician	Titus Manlius Torquatus
231	Plebeian	Quintus Fulvius Flaccus
230	Patrician	Quintus Fabius Maximus Verrucosus
230	Plebeian	Marcus Sempronius Tuditanus
225	Patrician	Gaius Claudius Centho
225	Plebeian	Marcus Junius Pera
220	Patrician	Lucius Aemilius Papus
220	Plebeian	Gaius Flaminius
214	Patrician	Publius Furius Philus
214	Plebeian	Marcus Atilius Regulus
210	Patrician	Lucius Veturius Philo
210	Plebeian	Publius Licinius Crassus Dives
209	Patrician	Marcus Cornelius Cethegus
209	Plebeian	Publius Sempronius Tuditanus
204	Patrician	Gaius Claudius Nero
204	Plebeian	Marcus Livius Salinator

== 2nd century BC ==
In 131 BC, for the first time both censors were plebeian.

After only one year in office the in 109 BC elected censor Marcus Livius Drusus died. His colleague Marcus Aemilius Scaurus at first refused to resign but resigned when new censors were elected in 108 BC.

Year	Birth	Name
199	Patrician	Publius Cornelius Scipio Africanus
199	Plebeian	Publius Aelius Paetus
194	Patrician	Gaius Cornelius Cethegus
194	Plebeian	Sextus Aelius Paetus Catus
189	Patrician	Titus Quinctius Flamininus
189	Plebeian	Marcus Claudius Marcellus
184	Patrician	Lucius Valerius Flaccus
184	Plebeian	Marcus Porcius Cato
179	Patrician	Marcus Aemilius Lepidus
179	Plebeian	Marcus Fulvius Nobilior
174	Patrician	Aulus Postumius Albinus Luscus
174	Plebeian	Quintus Fulvius Flaccus
169	Patrician	Gaius Claudius Pulcher
169	Plebeian	Tiberius Sempronius Gracchus
164	Patrician	Lucius Aemilius Paullus Macedonicus
164	Plebeian	Quintus Marcius Philippus
159	Patrician	Publius Cornelius Scipio Nasica Corculum
159	Plebeian	Marcus Popillius Laenas
154	Patrician	Marcus Valerius Messalla
154	Plebeian	Gaius Cassius Longinus
147	Patrician	Lucius Cornelius Lentulus Lupus
147	Plebeian	Lucius Marcius Censorinus
142	Patrician	Publius Cornelius Scipio Aemilianus
142	Plebeian	Lucius Mummius Achaicus
136	Patrician	Appius Claudius Pulcher
136	Plebeian	Quintus Fulvius Nobilior
131	Plebeian	Quintus Caecilius Metellus Macedonicus
131	Plebeian	Quintus Pompeius
125	Patrician	Gnaeus Servilius Caepio
125	Plebeian	Lucius Cassius Longinus Ravilla
120	Plebeian	Quintus Caecilius Metellus Balearicus
120	Plebeian	Lucius Calpurnius Piso Frugi
115	Plebeian	Lucius Caecilius Metellus Diadematus
115	Plebeian	Gnaeus Domitius Ahenobarbus
109	Patrician	Marcus Aemilius Scaurus
109	Plebeian	Marcus Livius Drusus
108	Patrician	Quintus Fabius Maximus Eburnus
108	Plebeian	Gaius Licinius Geta
102	Plebeian	Gaius Caecilius Metellus Caprarius
102	Plebeian	Quintus Caecilius Metellus Numidicus

== 1st century BC ==
Lucius Marcius Philippus and Marcus Perperna were elected censors in 86 BC. Due to civil war and the consequences of Sulla's dictatorship, no new censors were elected until 70 BC.

Year	Birth	Name
97	Patrician	Lucius Valerius Flaccus
97	Plebeian	Marcus Antonius
92	Plebeian	Gnaeus Domitius Ahenobarbus
92	Plebeian	Lucius Licinius Crassus
89	Patrician	Lucius Julius Caesar
89	Plebeian	Publius Licinius Crassus
86	Plebeian	Lucius Marcius Philippus
86	Plebeian	Marcus Perperna
70	Patrician	Gnaeus Cornelius Lentulus Clodianus
70	Plebeian	Lucius Gellius
65	Plebeian	Marcus Licinius Crassus
65	Plebeian	Quintus Lutatius Catulus
64	Unknown	Unknown
64	Plebeian	Lucius Aurelius Cotta
61	Patrician	Unknown, possibly Lucius Julius Caesar
61	Plebeian	Unknown, possibly Gaius Scribonius Curio
55	Patrician	Marcus Valerius Messalla Niger
55	Plebeian	Publius Servilius Vatia Isauricus
50	Patrician	Appius Claudius Pulcher
50	Plebeian	Lucius Calpurnius Piso Caesoninus
42	Patrician	Publius Sulpicius Rufus
42	Plebeian	Gaius Antonius Hybrida
28	Patrician	Caesar Augustus
28	Plebeian	Marcus Vipsanius Agrippa (They did not hold the title Censor)
22	Patrician	Paullus Aemilius Lepidus
22	Plebeian	Lucius Munatius Plancus
8	Patrician	Caesar Augustus as sole censor

== After the Republic ==
With the solidification of Augustus' rule, the Roman Republic came to an end. The office of censor nominally continued a small way into the Roman Empire, for example in 14 AD when Caesar Augustus held the office with Tiberius Caesar.
