= Treaty of Lutatius =

Peace treaty which ended the First Punic War

- Type: Peace Treaty
- Context: Treaty to end the First Punic War between Carthage and Rome
- Drafted: 241 BC
- Signed: 241 BC; With a codicil added in 237 BC
- Mediators: Hamilcar Barca; Gaius Lutatius Catulus
- Negotiators: Gisco; Gaius Lutatius Catulus; Quintus Lutatius Cerco
- Parties: Carthage; Rome

The Treaty of Lutatius was the agreement between Carthage and Rome of 241 BC (amended in 237 BC), that ended the First Punic War after 23 years of conflict. Most of the fighting during the war took place on, or in the waters around, the island of Sicily and in 241 BC a Carthaginian fleet was defeated by a Roman fleet commanded by Gaius Lutatius Catulus while attempting to lift the blockade of its last, beleaguered, strongholds there. Accepting defeat, the Carthaginian Senate ordered their army commander on Sicily, Hamilcar Barca, to negotiate a peace treaty with the Romans, on whatever terms he could negotiate. A draft treaty was rapidly agreed upon, but when it was referred to Rome for ratification it was rejected.

Rome then sent a ten-man commission to settle the matter. This in turn agreed that Carthage would hand over what it still held of Sicily; relinquish several groups of islands nearby; release all Roman prisoners without ransom, although ransom would need to be paid to secure the release of prisoners held by the Romans; and pay an indemnity of 3,200 talents (Note: Several different "talents" are known from antiquity. The ones referred to in this article are all Euboic (or Euboeic) talents, of approximately 26 kilograms (57 lb).) of silver – 82,000 kilograms (81 long tons) – over 10 years. The treaty received its name from the victorious Gaius Lutatius Catulus, who also negotiated the initial draft.

In 237 BC, when Carthage was recovering from a bitter and hard-fought civil war, it prepared an expedition to recover the island of Sardinia, which had been lost to rebels. Cynically, the Romans stated they considered this an act of war. Their peace terms were the ceding of Sardinia and Corsica and the payment of an additional 1,200-talent indemnity – 30,000 kg (30 long tons). Weakened by 30 years of war, Carthage agreed rather than enter into a conflict with Rome again; the additional payment and the renunciation of Sardinia and Corsica were added to the treaty.

== Primary sources ==
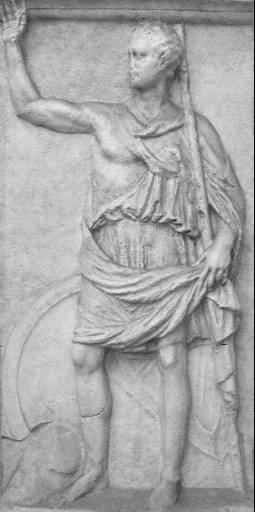
Polybius – "a remarkably well-informed, industrious, and insightful historian"

The main source for almost every aspect of the First Punic War (Note: The term Punic comes from the Latin word Punicus (or Poenicus), meaning "Carthaginian", and is a reference to the Carthaginians' Phoenician ancestry.) is the historian Polybius (c. 200 – c. 118 BC), a Greek sent to Rome in 167 BC as a hostage. His works include a now lost manual on military tactics, but he is known today for The Histories, written sometime after 146 BC, or about a century after the end of the war. Polybius's work is considered broadly objective and largely neutral as between Carthaginian and Roman points of view.

Carthaginian written records were destroyed along with their capital, Carthage, in 146 BC and so Polybius's account of the First Punic War is based on several, now-lost, Greek and Latin sources. Only part of the first book of the forty comprising The Histories deals with the First Punic War. The accuracy of Polybius's account has been much debated over the past 150 years, but the modern consensus is to accept it largely at face value, and the details of the treaty in modern sources are almost entirely based on interpretations of Polybius's account. The modern historian Andrew Curry considers "Polybius turns out to [be] fairly reliable"; while Dexter Hoyos describes him as "a remarkably well-informed, industrious, and insightful historian". Other, later, histories of the war and the treaty that ended it exist, but in fragmentary or summary form. Modern historians usually also take into account the histories of Diodorus Siculus and Dio Cassius, and the 12th-century Byzantine chronicler Joannes Zonaras, who relied on much earlier sources, is also sometimes used. All, like Polybius, draw most of their information from even earlier, now lost, accounts. The classicist Adrian Goldsworthy states "Polybius' account is usually to be preferred when it differs with any of our other accounts". (Note: Sources other than Polybius are discussed by Bernard Mineo in "Principal Literary Sources for the Punic Wars (apart from Polybius)".)

== First Punic War ==
The Roman Republic had been aggressively expanding in the southern Italian mainland for a century before the First Punic War. It had conquered peninsular Italy south of the River Arno by 272 BC. During this period Carthage, with its capital in what is now Tunisia, had come to dominate southern Hispania, much of the coastal regions of North Africa, the Balearic Islands, Corsica, Sardinia, and the western half of Sicily in a military and commercial empire. In 264 BC Carthage and Rome were the pre-eminent powers in the western Mediterranean. The two states had several times asserted their mutual friendship via formal alliances: in 509 BC, 348 BC and around 279 BC. Relationships were good, with strong commercial links. In 264 BC the two cities went to war over the city of Messana (modern Messina) in the north-eastern tip of Sicily.

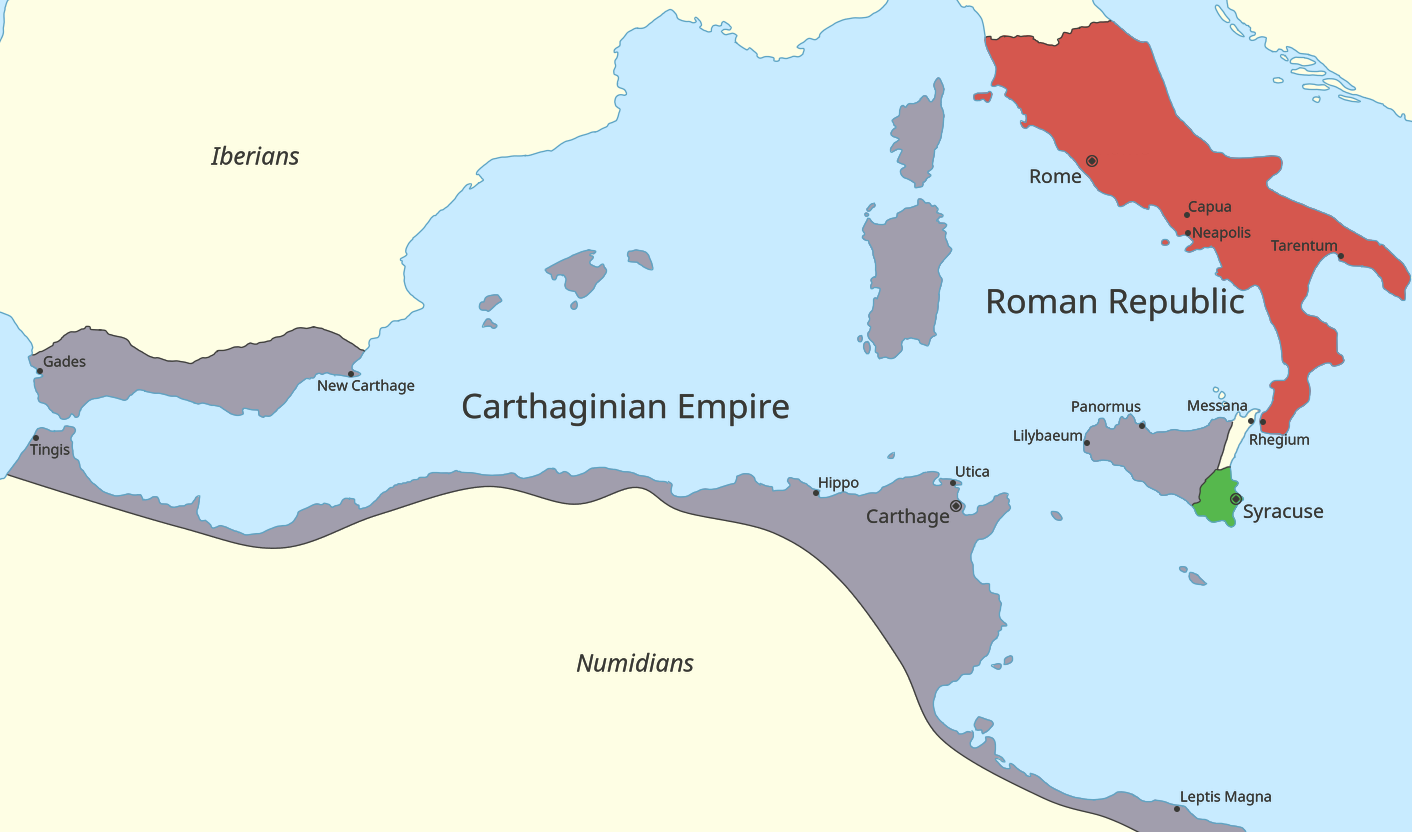
Territory controlled by Rome and Carthage at the start of the First Punic War

The war lasted 23 years, with the maritime aspect the largest and longest naval war of the ancient world. By 249 BC the war had developed into a struggle in which the Romans were attempting to decisively defeat the Carthaginians and, at a minimum, control the whole of Sicily. The Carthaginians were engaging in their traditional policy of waiting for their opponents to wear themselves out, in the expectation of then regaining some or all of their possessions and negotiating a mutually satisfactory peace treaty. Rome was the stronger land-based power and had gained control of most of Sicily. The Carthaginian leadership preferred to expand their area of control in North Africa at the expense of the Numidians, and probably viewed Sicily as a secondary theatre.

From 250 BC the Carthaginians held only two cities on Sicily: Lilybaeum and Drepana; these were well-fortified and situated on the west coast, where they could be supplied and reinforced without the Romans being able to use their superior army to interfere. When Hamilcar Barca (Note: Hamilcar Barca was the father of Hannibal.) took command of the Carthaginians on Sicily in 247 BC he was only given a small army and the Carthaginian fleet was gradually withdrawn. After more than 20 years of war, both states were financially exhausted and were struggling to find sufficient men of military age for their armies and navies. Evidence of Carthage's financial situation includes their request for a 2,000-talent loan (Note: 2,000 talents was approximately 52,000 kilograms (51 long tons) of silver.) from Ptolemaic Egypt, which was refused. Rome was also close to bankruptcy and the number of adult male citizens, who provided the manpower for the navy and the legions, had declined by 17 per cent since the start of the war.

In late 243 BC realising they would not capture Drepana and Lilybaeum unless they could extend their blockade to the sea, the Roman Senate decided to build a new fleet. With the state's coffers exhausted, the Senate approached Rome's wealthiest citizens for loans to finance the construction of one ship each, repayable from the reparations to be imposed on Carthage once the war was won. The result was a fleet of approximately 200 large warships, built, equipped, and crewed without government expense. The Carthaginians raised a larger fleet which they intended to use to run supplies into Sicily. It was intercepted by the Roman fleet under Gaius Lutatius Catulus and Quintus Valerius Falto on 10 March 241 BC and in the hard-fought Battle of the Aegates the better-trained Romans defeated the undermanned and ill-trained Carthaginian fleet. Of the 250 Carthaginian warships, 50 were sunk – 20 of them with all hands – and 70 captured. After achieving this decisive victory, the Romans continued their land operations in Sicily against Lilybaeum and Drepana.

== Treaty ==
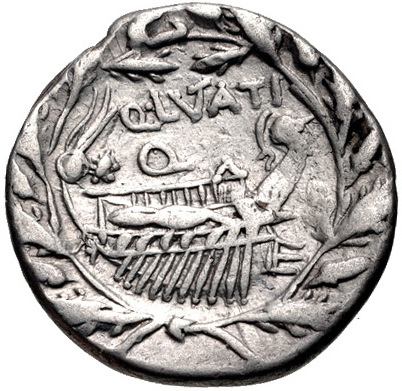
A Roman coin from 109 BC alluding to Catulus's victory; it shows a galley within a wreath of oak leaves.

With their relief effort defeated, the Carthaginian Senate was reluctant to allocate the resources necessary to build and man another fleet. In any case, it was probable their Sicilian garrisons would be starved into surrender before that could be done. Instead, it ordered Hamilcar to negotiate a peace treaty with the Romans, on whatever terms he could obtain. After receiving the order to make peace, Hamilcar refused, claiming the surrender was unnecessary. Several modern historians have raised the possibility that for political and prestige reasons Hamilcar did not wish to be associated with the treaty which formalised Carthage's defeat in the 23-year-long war. As the next most senior Carthaginian on the island, it was left to Gisco, the commander of Lilybaeum, to broker the peace terms.

Gisco opened discussions with Catulus, the recently victorious Roman commander on Sicily. It was the long-standing Roman procedure to appoint two men each year, known as consuls, to each lead an army. Catulus's term was near its end and his replacement could be expected to arrive on Sicily shortly. This caused him to be flexible during the negotiations as he was eager to conclude a definitive peace while he still had the authority to, and thus claim the credit for bringing the lengthy war to a close. Gisco and Catulus agreed Carthage would hand over what it still held of Sicily; release all Roman prisoners without ransom, although ransom would need to be paid to secure the release of prisoners held by the Romans; and pay an indemnity of 2,200 talents of silver – 57,000 kilograms (56 long tons) – over 20 years. These terms were referred to Rome for ratification, where they were rejected by the Centuriate Assembly, one of the three Roman popular assemblies. A ten-man commission was then sent to Sicily to settle the matter. The commission was chaired by Catulus's brother Quintus Lutatius Cerco, who by this time had succeeded him as consul. The historian of ancient Rome Adam Ziolkowski argues there was a faction in Rome opposed to the treaty, and possibly to ending the war at all, which was led by the ex-consul Aulus Manlius Torquatus Atticus. This possible disagreement within Roman policy makers was exemplified by Atticus being elected consul again in 241 BC alongside Cerco.

Gisco rapidly agreed to further concessions with the commission: several islands close to Sicily would also be handed over; (Note: Probably the Lipari and Aegades Islands and Ustica.) the indemnity was increased to 3,200 talents, (Note: 3,200 talents was approximately 82,000 kg (81 long tons) of silver.) with the additional 1,000 talents (Note: 1,000 talents was approximately 25,000 kg (25 long tons) of silver.) payable immediately (Note: Goldsworthy suggests this was to enable the money borrowed to build the recently victorious fleet to be promptly repaid.) and the time allowed to pay the balance reduced to 10 years. There were other minor clauses in the final agreement: neither party was to interfere with the other's allies nor make war on them; nor recruit soldiers from the other's territory; nor raise money for public works from the other party's territory. These were all formalised in the Treaty of Lutatius, named after Catulus, who had remained on Sicily as a proconsul. Hamilcar immediately handed over command on Sicily to Gisco, who was left to formally inform Carthage of what had been agreed. Catulus returned to Rome to celebrate a triumph on 4 October.

The views of modern scholars on the treaty are mixed. Nigel Bagnall says that the negotiators on both sides "showed themselves realistic and reasonable in their demands". Adrian Goldsworthy states "the peace terms made it clear that [Carthage] had been defeated" and Richard Miles claims that "the terms agreed in 241 were harsh". On the other hand, Bruno Bleckmann believes the treaty to have been "remarkably moderate" and Howard Scullard states that it was "somewhat lenient" for Carthage.

=== Sardinia and Corsica ===
After Carthage evacuated its 20,000-strong army from Sicily to North Africa it became embroiled with the troops in a pay dispute. Eventually the troops mutinied and a war with Carthage broke out. The news of a formed, experienced, anti-Carthaginian army in the heart of its territory spread rapidly and many cities and towns rose in rebellion; some were freshly conquered and all had been harshly oppressed to finance the recently ended war. They added 70,000 men to the rebel force and supplied food and financial resources. Rome pointedly declined to take advantage of Carthage's troubles and adhered to the terms of the recent treaty. Italians were prohibited from trading with the rebels but encouraged to trade with Carthage; 2,743 Carthaginian prisoners still held were released without a ransom and were immediately enrolled into Carthage's army. Hiero II, the king of the Roman satellite kingdom of Syracuse, was allowed to supply Carthage with the large amounts of food it needed and was no longer able to obtain from its own hinterland. In late 240 or early 239 BC the Carthaginian garrisons on Sardinia joined the mutiny, killing their officers and the island's governor. The Carthaginians sent a force to retake the island. When it arrived its members also mutinied, joined the previous mutineers, and killed all of the Carthaginians on the island. The mutineers then appealed to Rome for protection, which was refused.

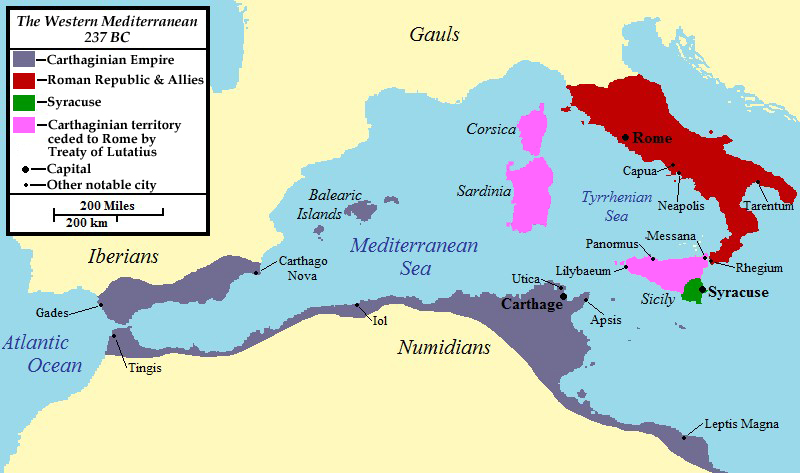
Territory ceded to Rome by Carthage under the treaty is shown in pink

Probably in 237 BC the indigenous inhabitants of Sardinia rose up and drove out the mutinous garrison, which took refuge in Roman-controlled Italy. As the war in Africa came to a close, they appealed again for Roman assistance. This time the Romans agreed and prepared an expedition to seize both Sardinia and Corsica. It is unclear from the sources why the Romans acted differently from three years earlier. Polybius held that this action was indefensible. Carthage sent an embassy to Rome, who quoted the Treaty of Lutatius and claimed Carthage was outfitting its own expedition to retake the island, which it had held for 300 years. The Roman Senate stated they considered the preparation of this force an act of war, and demanded Carthage cede Sardinia and Corsica, and pay an additional 1,200-talent indemnity, as peace terms. (Note: 1,200 talents was approximately 30,000 kg (30 long tons) of silver.) Weakened by 30 years of war, Carthage agreed rather than again enter into conflict with Rome. The renunciation of Sardinia, which was understood to include Corsica, and the additional payment were added to the treaty as a codicil. Polybius considered this "contrary to all justice" and modern historians have variously described the Romans' behaviour as "unprovoked aggression and treaty-breaking", "shamelessly opportunistic" and an "unscrupulous act".

== Aftermath ==
For Rome, the treaty marked the start of its expansion beyond the Italian Peninsula. Sicily became the first Roman province as Sicilia, governed by a praetor – with the exception of Syracuse, which remained nominally independent and a close ally of Rome. The Romans required a strong military presence on Sardinia and Corsica for at least the next seven years, as they struggled to suppress the local inhabitants. Henceforth Rome was the leading military power in the western Mediterranean, and increasingly the Mediterranean region as a whole. The seizure of Sardinia and Corsica by Rome and the additional indemnity fuelled resentment in Carthage, which was not reconciled to Rome's perception of its situation. When Carthage besieged the Roman-protected town of Saguntum (Note: There is scholarly debate as to whether Saguntum was a formal Roman ally, in which case attacking it may have been a breach of the clause in the Treaty of Lutatius prohibiting attacking each others allies; or whether the city had less formally requested Rome's protection, and possibly been granted it. In either case, the Carthaginians argued that relationships entered into after the signing of the treaty were not covered by it.) in eastern Iberia in 218 BC it ignited the Second Punic War with Rome.

== Notes, citations and sources ==
=== Sources ===
- Bagnall, Nigel (1999). The Punic Wars: Rome, Carthage and the Struggle for the Mediterranean. London: Pimlico. ISBN 978-0-7126-6608-4.
- Bleckmann, Bruno (2015) [2011]. "Roman Politics in the First Punic War". In Hoyos, Dexter (ed.). A Companion to the Punic Wars. Chichester, West Sussex: John Wiley & Sons. pp. 167–183. ISBN 978-1-1190-2550-4.
- Bringmann, Klaus (2007). A History of the Roman Republic. Cambridge, United Kingdom: Polity Press. ISBN 978-0-7456-3370-1.
- Champion, Craige B. (2015) [2011]. "Polybius and the Punic Wars". In Hoyos, Dexter (ed.). A Companion to the Punic Wars. Chichester, West Sussex: John Wiley & Sons. pp. 95–110. ISBN 978-1-1190-2550-4.
- Collins, Roger (1998). Spain: An Oxford Archaeological Guide. Oxford University Press. ISBN 978-0-19-285300-4.
- Crawford, Michael (1974). Roman Republican Coinage. Cambridge: Cambridge University Press. OCLC 859598398.
- Curry, Andrew (2012). "The Weapon That Changed History". Archaeology. 65 (1): 32–37. JSTOR 41780760.
- Goldsworthy, Adrian (2006). The Fall of Carthage: The Punic Wars 265–146 BC. London: Phoenix. ISBN 978-0-304-36642-2.
- Hau, Lisa (2016). Moral History from Herodotus to Diodorus Siculus. Edinburgh: Edinburgh University Press. ISBN 978-1-4744-1107-3.
- Hoyos, Dexter (2000). "Towards a Chronology of the 'Truceless War', 241–237 B.C.". Rheinisches Museum für Philologie. 143 (3/4): 369–380. JSTOR 41234468.
- Hoyos, Dexter (2015) [2011]. A Companion to the Punic Wars. Chichester, West Sussex: John Wiley & Sons. ISBN 978-1-1190-2550-4.
- Lazenby, John (1996). The First Punic War: A Military History. Stanford, California: Stanford University Press. ISBN 978-0-8047-2673-3.
- Miles, Richard (2011). Carthage Must be Destroyed. New York: Penguin. ISBN 978-0-14-101809-6.
- Mineo, Bernard (2015) [2011]. "Principal Literary Sources for the Punic Wars (apart from Polybius)". In Hoyos, Dexter (ed.). A Companion to the Punic Wars. Chichester, West Sussex: John Wiley & Sons. pp. 111–128. ISBN 978-1-1190-2550-4.
- Scullard, H.H. (2006) [1989]. "Carthage and Rome". In Walbank, F. W.; Astin, A. E.; Frederiksen, M. W. & Ogilvie, R. M. (eds.). Cambridge Ancient History: Volume 7, Part 2, 2nd Edition. Cambridge: Cambridge University Press. pp. 486–569. ISBN 978-0-521-23446-7.
- Shutt, Rowland (1938). "Polybius: A Sketch". Greece & Rome. 8 (22): 50–57. doi:10.1017/S001738350000588X. JSTOR 642112. S2CID 162905667.
- Sidwell, Keith C.; Jones, Peter V. (1997). The World of Rome: An Introduction to Roman Culture. Cambridge University Press. ISBN 978-0-521-38600-5.
- Tipps, G.K. (1985). "The Battle of Ecnomus". Historia: Zeitschrift für Alte Geschichte. 34 (4th Qtr): 432–465. JSTOR 4435938.
- Walbank, F.W. (1990). Polybius. Vol. 1. Berkeley: University of California Press. ISBN 978-0-520-06981-7.
- Wardle, David (2005). "Valerius Maximus and the End of the First Punic War". Latomus. 64 (2): 377–384. JSTOR 41544894.
- Warmington, Brian (1993) [1960]. Carthage. New York: Barnes & Noble, Inc. ISBN 978-1-56619-210-1.
- Ziolkowski, Adam (1992). The Temples of Mid-Republican Rome and Their Historical and Topographical Context. Rome: L'Erma di Bretschneider. ISBN 978-88-7062-798-5.
