= Lutatia gens =

Ancient Roman family

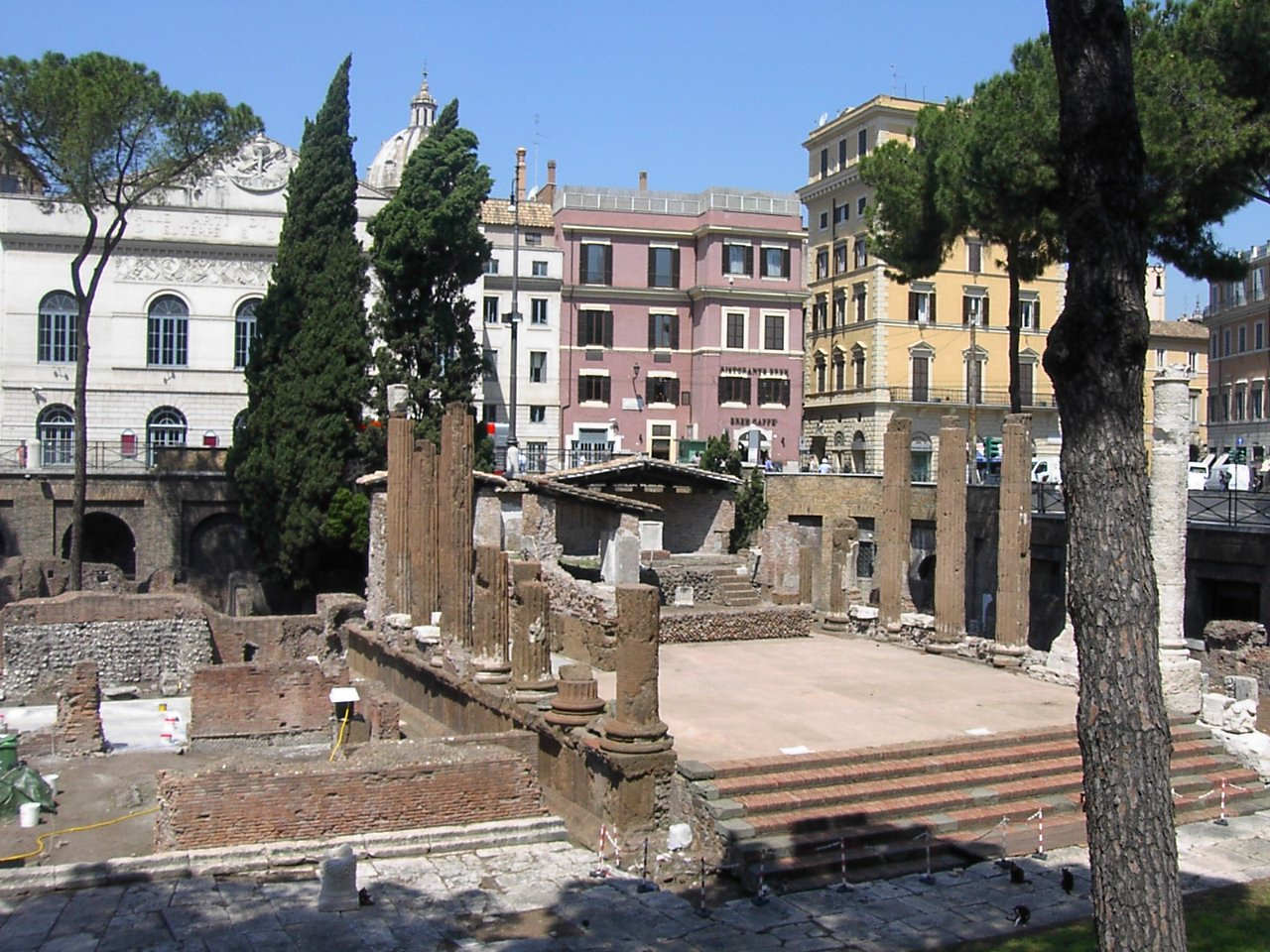
Temple of Juturna at Largo di Torre Argentina, built by Gaius Lutatius Catulus to celebrate his victory at the Aegades.

The gens Lutatia, occasionally written Luctatia, was a plebeian family of ancient Rome. The first of the gens to obtain the consulship was Gaius Lutatius Catulus in 242 BC, the final year of the First Punic War. Orosius mentions their burial place, the sepulchrum Lutatiorum, which lay beyond the Tiber.

== Praenomina ==
The chief praenomina used by the Lutatii of the Republic were Gaius and Quintus, from which they rarely deviated; but there are also instances of Gnaeus and Marcus, which were probably given to younger children.

== Branches and cognomina ==
The surnames of the Lutatii under the Republic were Catulus, Cerco, and Pinthia, of which only the second is found on Roman coins.

- Catulus, borne by the most famous family of the Lutatii, is probably derived from the same root as Cato, which originally described someone shrewd, wise, or cautious (catus). An alternative explanation would translate the surname as "puppy, whelp" or "cub".
- Cerco, borne by some of the Catuli, refers to a tail.

== Members ==
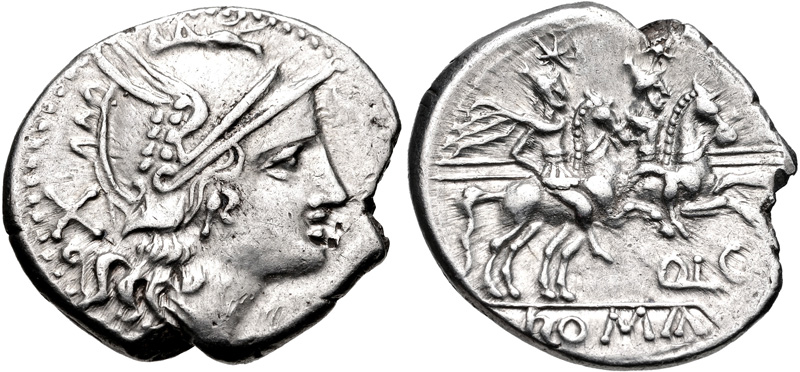
Denarius of Quintus Lutatius, 206–200 BC. The obverse depicts Roma; on the reverse are the Dioscuri.

This list includes abbreviated praenomina. For an explanation of this practice, see filiation.

=== Catuli et Cercones ===
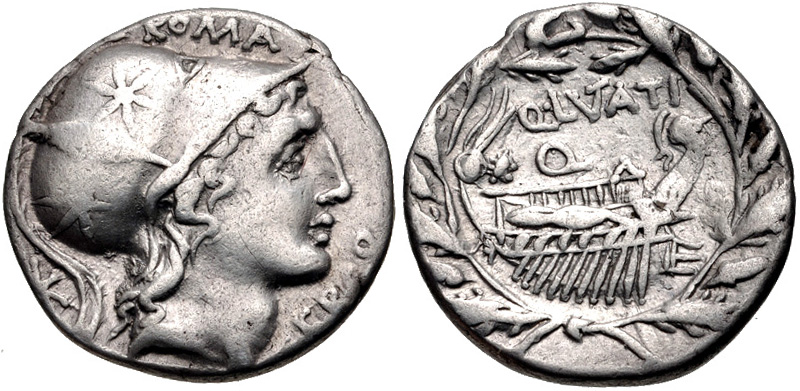
Denarius of Quintus Lutatius Cerco, c. 109 BC. The obverse depicts Roma (or Mars). On the reverse is a ship within an oak wreath, alluding to Gaius Lutatius Catulus's naval victory and triumph.

- Gaius Lutatius, grandfather of the consuls of 242 and 241 BC.
- Gaius Lutatius C. f., father of the consuls.
- Gaius Lutatius C. f. C. n. Catulus, consul in 242 BC, he had command of the Roman fleet at the Battle of the Aegates, and defeated the Carthaginian fleet under Hanno II the Great, after which Carthage agreed to negotiate an end to the war.
- Quintus Lutatius C. f. C. n. Cerco, consul in 241 BC, helped negotiate the terms of the treaty with Carthage. Soon afterward, there was a revolt at Falerii; Lutatius and his colleague defeated them and triumphed. He was censor in 236, but died during his year of office.
- Gaius Lutatius C. f. C. n. Catulus, consul in 220 BC.
- Quintus Lutatius Catulus or Cerco, triumvir monetalis between 206 and 200 BC.
- Gnaeus Lutatius Cerco, one of the ambassadors sent to Alexandria in 173 BC.
- Gnaeus Lutatius Cn. f. (Cerco), a senator c. 140 BC.
- Quintus Lutatius Cerco, a quaestor in 109 or 108 BC. He minted coins celebrating the Battle of the Aegates during his magistracy.
- Quintus Lutatius Q. f. Catulus, an orator, poet, and writer of prose. He was consul in 102 BC, with Gaius Marius as his colleague. They fought against the Cimbri and Teutones. Later, during the civil war between Marius and Sulla, Catulus took his own life rather than face the partisans of his former colleague. His wife was Servilia.
- Quintus Lutatius Q. f. Q. n. Catulus Capitolinus, consul in 78 BC, and censor in 65. A prominent senator, Catulus supported Sulla during the civil wars. He married a sister of Quintus Hortensius, the orator, who in turn married a sister of Lutatius.
- Lutatia Q. f. Q. n., the wife of the orator Hortensius. Her daughter, Hortensia, inherited her father's rhetorical skills.

=== Others ===
- Marcus Lutatius Pinthia, an eques who lived in the middle part of the second century BC.
- Lutatius, the author of a history titled Communis Historia, sometimes attributed to Gaius Lutatius Catulus, but probably by another Lutatius, since Cicero does not mention it among Catulus' works.
- Lutatius Daphnis, a grammarian, originally purchased as a slave by Quintus Lutatius Catulus, but afterward manumitted.
- Quintus Lutatius Diodorus, became a Roman citizen under Sulla, at the behest of Quintus Lutatius Catulus. He settled at Lilybaeum, where he was victimized by Verres.
- Lutatius, a scholiast on Statius.

== See also ==
- List of Roman gentes

== Bibliography ==
- Polybius, Historiae (The Histories).
- Gaius Sallustius Crispus (Sallust), Bellum Catilinae (The Conspiracy of Catiline).
- Marcus Tullius Cicero, In Catilinam, Pro Gaio Rabirio Perduellionis Reo, Epistulae ad Atticum, Pro Balbo, In Verrem, Pro Sestio, Pro Lege Manilia, Pro Plancio, De Officiis.
- Titus Livius (Livy), Ab Urbe Condita (History of Rome).
- Marcus Velleius Paterculus, Compendium of Roman History.
- Valerius Maximus, Factorum ac Dictorum Memorabilium (Memorable Facts and Sayings).
- Lucius Annaeus Seneca (Seneca the Younger), Epistulae Morales ad Lucilium (Moral Letters to Lucilius).
- Gaius Plinius Secundus (Pliny the Elder), Naturalis Historia (Natural History).
- Marcus Fabius Quintilianus (Quintilian), Institutio Oratoria (Institutes of Oratory).
- Marcus Valerius Probus, In Vergilii Bucolica et Georgica Commentarius (Commentary on Vergil's Bucolics and Georgics).
- Publius Cornelius Tacitus, Historiae.
- Gaius Suetonius Tranquillus, De Vita Caesarum (Lives of the Caesars, or The Twelve Caesars).
- Lucius Annaeus Florus, Epitome de T. Livio Bellorum Omnium Annorum DCC (Epitome of Livy: All the Wars of Seven Hundred Years).
- Appianus Alexandrinus (Appian), Bellum Civile (The Civil War).
- Plutarchus, Lives of the Noble Greeks and Romans.
- Gaius Suetonius Tranquillus, De Illustribus Grammaticis (The Illustrious Grammarians).
- Lucius Cassius Dio Cocceianus (Cassius Dio), Roman History.
- Paulus Orosius, Historiarum Adversum Paganos (History Against the Pagans).
- Eutropius, Breviarium Historiae Romanae (Abridgement of the History of Rome).
- Maurus Servius Honoratus, Ad Virgilii Aeneidem Commentarii (Commentary on Vergil's Aeneid).
- Joannes Zonaras, Epitome Historiarum (Epitome of History).
- Joseph Hilarius Eckhel, Doctrina Numorum Veterum (The Study of Ancient Coins, 1792–1798).
- August Wilhelm Ferdinand Krause, Vitae et Fragmenta Veterum Historicorum Romanorum (Lives and Fragments of Ancient Roman Historians), Ferdinand Dümmler, Berlin (1833).
- Johann Caspar von Orelli, Onomasticon Tullianum, Orell Füssli, Zürich (1826–1838).
- Dictionary of Greek and Roman Biography and Mythology, William Smith, ed., Little, Brown and Company, Boston (1849).
- Wilhelm Dittenberger, Sylloge Inscriptionum Graecarum (Collection of Greek Inscriptions, abbreviated SIG), Leipzig (1883).
- George Davis Chase, "The Origin of Roman Praenomina", in Harvard Studies in Classical Philology, vol. VIII (1897).
- T. Robert S. Broughton, The Magistrates of the Roman Republic, American Philological Association (1952–1986).
- Michael Crawford, Roman Republican Coinage, Cambridge University Press (1974, 2001).
- Erich S. Gruen, The Last Generation of the Roman Republic, University of California Press (1995).
