= Lutatius Catulus =

Lutatius Catulus may refer to different individuals in ancient Rome:

- Gaius Lutatius Catulus, Roman admiral during the First Punic War
- Quintus Lutatius Catulus, Roman general and consul in 102 BCE
