= Gaius Atilius Bulbus =

3rd-century BC Roman consul

Gaius Atilius Bulbus was a Roman statesman in the 3rd century BC. He served as consul twice, first in 245 with Marcus Fabius Buteo, then again in 235 alongside Titus Manlius Torquatus, who would later go on to become dictator in 208. Bulbus also served as censor in 234 alongside Aulus Postumius Albinus.

Political offices
Preceded by Manius Otacilius Crassus and Marcus Fabius Licinus	Consul of the Roman Republic; 245 BC; With: Marcus Fabius Buteo	Succeeded by Aulus Manlius Torquatus Atticus and Gaius Sempronius Blaesus
Preceded by Publius Cornelius Lentulus Caudinus and Gaius Licinius Varus	Consul of the Roman Republic; 235 BC; With: Titus Manlius Torquatus	Succeeded by Lucius Postumius Albinus and Spurius Carvilius Maximus Ruga
