= Aulus Postumius Albinus (consul 242 BC) =

Aulus Postumius Albinus was a politician of Ancient Rome, of patrician rank, of the 3rd century BC.

He was elected consul in 242 BC with Gaius Lutatius Catulus, who defeated the Carthaginians in the Battle of the Aegates Islands, and thus, brought the First Punic War to an end. Albinus was kept in the city, against his will, by the Pontifex Maximus, because he was Flamen Martialis. He was censor in 234 BC, and was apparently the father of the Lucius Postumius Albinus who was consul in 234 and 229 BC.

== See also ==
- Postumia gens

Political offices
Preceded by Gaius Fundanius Fundulus; Gaius Sulpicius Gallus	Roman consul 242 BC; With: Gaius Lutatius Catulus	Succeeded by Aulus Manlius Torquatus Atticus; Quintus Lutatius Cerco
