= Princeps senatus =

First member by precedence of the Roman Senate

The princeps senatus (pl. principes senatus), in English the leader of the senate, was the first member by precedence on the membership rolls of the Roman Senate. Although officially out of the cursus honorum and possessing no imperium, this office conferred prestige on the senator holding it.

The position was created in the first half of the third century BC and retained its prominence for two centuries. The principes were often the most famous Roman politicians of the period, such as Marcus Aemilius Lepidus, Scipio Africanus, and Marcus Aemilius Scaurus. It lost its importance after the reforms of the dictator Sulla in 82–80 BC, but might have been temporarily restored for Cicero, its possible last incumbent during the struggle between Mark Antony and the Senate in 43 BC. The Roman emperors merged the princeps senatus' prerogatives with their own, although there are occasional mentions of distinctive principes during the later Empire.

== History ==
The princeps senatus was chosen by the pair of censors (that is, every 5 years on average) whenever there was a vacancy on the seat during their tenure. The princeps senatus was not a lifetime appointment. However, in practice, the incumbent princeps senatus was always re-appointed by the censors.

Traditionally, the princeps senatus had the honour of speaking first on any motion or topic presented by the presiding magistrate. By the middle republic, the princeps senatus was the most prestigious position in Rome and had adduced further privileges: he moved all routine senate business, having power to have his input directly moulded into them by choosing their wording. He also set out the possible options on controversial proposals. Some notable principes of this period were the famous Scipio Africanus (appointed in 199, 194, and 189) and Marcus Aemilius Lepidus, who was appointed a record six times between 179 and 154 and combined his position with that of pontifex maximus – the Roman chief priesthood.

=== Appointment ===
The position of princeps senatus was not defined by law (lex), but by tradition (mos), which makes it more difficult to follow its evolution. For a long time, modern historians were influenced by the works of Theodor Mommsen, who thought that the principes senatus could only be patricians of the gentes maiores – the most illustrious patrician families (Cornelia, Valeria, Fabia, Aemilia, Manlia, and Claudia). However, Francis Ryan showed that Mommsen's argument was circular: he first asserted that the princeps must be from a gens maior, and later said the list of gentes maiores can be drawn from the principes – while ancient sources are silent on many principes and do not give the list of the gentes maiores. Ryan has argued instead that the princeps could be a plebeian: first, ancient sources never mention Mommsen's patrician requirement; second, because the post was established after the end of the Conflict of the Orders, the plebeians would not have allowed the patricians to create an office barred to them.

The princeps senatus appeared in the beginning of the third century BC, possibly in 275. It finds its origin in the lex Ovinia of c. 313 BC, which considerably changed the composition of the Senate. Before this law, senators were about a hundred and appointed by the consuls from among their supporters; membership of the Senate therefore changed every year. The lex Ovinia transferred the power to appoint senators to the censors, who could remove senators only in cases of misconduct, thus making them appointed for life. The law also increased their number to 300. These changes led the censors to make an official list of senators, recording their right to sit in the Senate. The first censor to make this list was likely Appius Claudius Caecus, who was said to have invented the rhotacism in Latin, perhaps in the process of writing this list, since several Latin names changed in these years. Another reform of the Senate followed a few decades later: senators were by now picked from among former magistrates. As a result, senators were ordered by the censors in several ranks according to their past magistracies. This ordering by seniority led to the creation of the princeps senatus: the first name on the list of senators, who was always the most senior ex-censor, patrician or plebeian; the censors could not make a choice between candidates. Caecus was almost certainly not the first princeps, because the extensive tradition about him would not have failed to mention this fact. He is also described as an old man speaking in the Senate against Pyrrhus c. 280 BC. Since he was the most senior former censor at that date, the first princeps was necessarily appointed after his death. The most probable candidate is therefore Quintus Fabius Maximus Rullianus, chosen by the censors of 275, whose lectio left a mark in ancient sources.

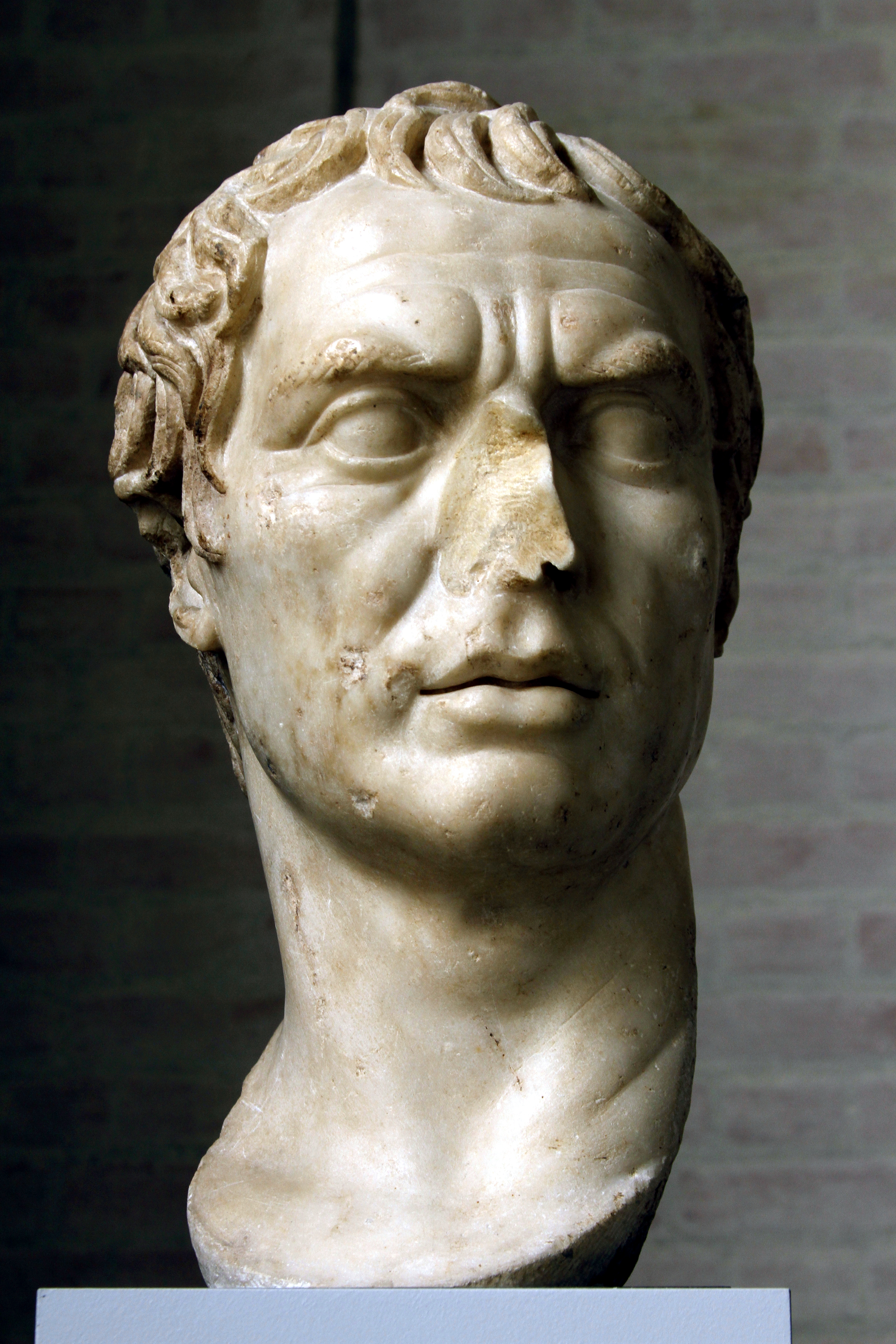
Ancient bust of Scipio Africanus, princeps senatus from 199 to 184/183 BC.

In 209 BC, the censor Publius Sempronius Tuditanus went against the tradition and appointed Quintus Fabius Maximus Verrucosus instead of Titus Manlius Torquatus, the senior ex-censor. Tuditanus justified his choice by saying that Fabius was the foremost of all the Romans ("princeps Romanae civitatis"). After this date, the princeps was the most important politician of the day, chosen among the ex-consuls, and often one of the sitting censors, appointed by the other censor. When the censors could not agree on a candidate, the choice was solved by lot, as in 209 BC.

=== Decline after Sulla's reforms ===
The status and function of princeps senatus ceased to be relevant after the reforms of Sulla in 82–80 BC. As dictator, Sulla established a strict oligarchic order in order to prevent any man from rising above the rest (for example, iteration of the consulship was banned). Several scholars, such as Theodor Mommsen and Ernst Badian, believe that Sulla even abolished the office. However, Sulla would probably not have demoted his close ally, the princeps Lucius Valerius Flaccus, who had enabled his appointment as dictator though the lex Valeria. Although the position probably continued – there was still a list of senators and someone had to be listed first – the prerogatives of the office fell away. In particular, consuls designate assumed the honour of speaking first. This may be because, through the 80s and 70s, the senior living ex-censors – the most senior members of the senate, in the absence of a formal princeps senatus due to the paucity of censorial lectiones, – were largely uninfluential and unimportant men. Even when named first in the list of senators, they were largely so named by default or custom and were unable to assert speaking privilege before more influential, but junior, consulars.

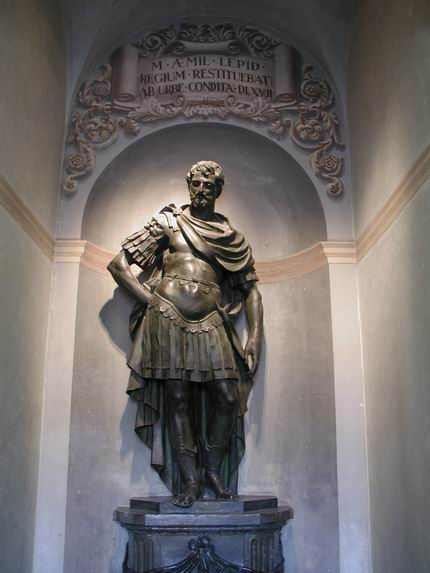
Modern statue of Marcus Aemlius Lepidus, the longest serving princeps senatus (179–153/152 BC).

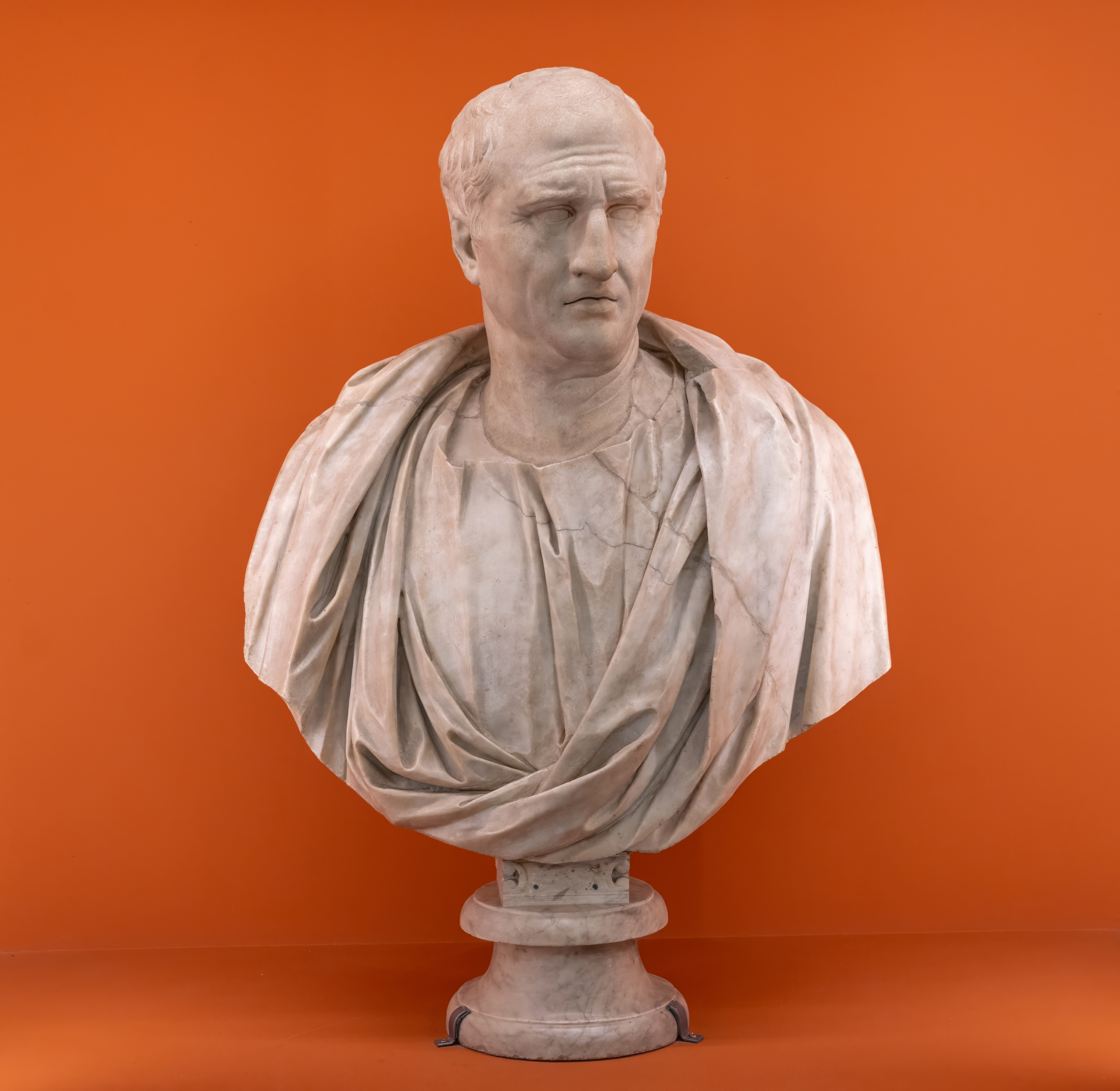
Ancient bust of Cicero, possibly the last princeps senatus of the republic in 43 BC.

Pierre Willems and Francis Ryan have suggested that Cicero may have been the last princeps senatus of the Republic, appointed after April 43 by his fellow senators. Such restoration of this ancient office was part of "diehard republicans"' propaganda against Mark Antony, whom Cicero had violently attacked in his Philippicae. Cicero's ascribed leadership of the senate, however, may not have been through the office of princeps senatus as such.

=== During the Empire ===
The position was revived by Augustus in 28 BC; he, irregularly, appointed himself. If the post was limited to certain gentes, the Julii were possibly ineligible, and Augustus was not yet then one of the customary candidates (senior ex-censors). Regardless, Augustus held the office until his death; it then absorbed into the emperor's offices and powers.

In the emperor's absence, it is possible that a senator was granted the privilege of holding this role when the Senate met; the notoriously unreliable Historia Augusta claimed that during the Crisis of the Third Century, some others held the position; in particular, it stated that the future emperor Valerian held the office in AD 238, during the reigns of Maximinus Thrax and Gordian I, and he continued to hold it through to the reign of Decius. The same source also makes the same claim about Tacitus when the Senate acclaimed him emperor in AD 275.

== List of principes senatus ==
	Mommsen (1864)	Willems (1878)	Suolahti (1972)	Ryan (1998)	Ryan's dating
1	M'. Valerius Maximus			Q. Fabius Maximus Rullianus	c. 275 – c. 265
2	M. Fabius Ambustus			C. Marcius Rutilus Censorinus	265 – before 258
3	Q. Fabius Maximus Rullianus			Q. Fabius Maximus Gurges	258 – 247 or 241
4	Q. Fabius Maximus Gurges			Cn. Cornelius Blasio	247 or 241 – before 230
5	Q. Fabius Maximus Verrucosus	M. Fabius Buteo		C. Duilius	c. 230 – 225
6	P. Cornelius Scipio Africanus	Q. Fabius Maximus Verrucosus		M'. Valerius Maximus Corvinus Messalla	c. 225 – before 220
7	L. Valerius Flaccus	P. Cornelius Scipio Africanus		Aulus Manlius Torquatus Atticus	c. 220 – before 216
8	M. Aemilius Lepidus	L. Valerius Flaccus		M. Fabius Buteo	by 216 – 209
9	P. Cornelius Scipio Nasica Corculum	M. Aemilius Lepidus		Q. Fabius Maximus Verrucosus	209 – 203
10	Ap. Claudius Pulcher	P. Cornelius Scipio Nasica Corculum		P. Cornelius Scipio Africanus	199 – 184/183
11	P. Cornelius Lentulus (cos 162)	P. Cornelius Scipio Nasica Serapio	Ap. Claudius Pulcher	L. Valerius Flaccus	184/183 – 180
12	M. Aemilius Scaurus	Ap. Claudius Pulcher	L. Cornelius Lentulus Lupus	M. Aemilius Lepidus	179–153/152
13	L. Valerius Flaccus	P. Cornelius Lentulus (cos 162)		P. Cornelius Scipio Nasica Corculum	c. 147 – c. 141
14	Mam. Aemilius Lepidus Livianus	L. Cornelius Lentulus Lupus	M. Aemilius Scaurus	Ap. Claudius Pulcher	c. 136 – before 130
15		M. Aemilius Scaurus	L. Valerius Flaccus	L. Cornelius Lentulus Lupus	130? – before 125
16		L. Valerius Flaccus		P. Cornelius Lentulus (cos 162)	c. 125 – before 115
17		Quintus Lutatius Catulus		M. Aemilius Scaurus	115 – c. 89
18		Publius Servilius Vatia Isauricus		L. Valerius Flaccus	by 86 – 70s
19		M. Tullius Cicero		M. Tullius Cicero	after 21 April – 7 Dec. 43

== See also ==
- Father of the House, a loosely analogous position of seniority in some modern parliaments
- President pro tempore of the United States Senate, traditionally the most senior senator from the governing party

== General and cited references ==
- Badian, Ernst (2012). "princeps senatus". In Hornblower, Simon; et al. (eds.). The Oxford classical dictionary (4th ed.). Oxford University Press. doi:10.1093/acrefore/9780199381135.013.5331. ISBN 978-0-19-954556-8. OCLC 959667246.
- Broughton, Thomas Robert Shannon (1951). The magistrates of the Roman republic. Vol. 1. New York: American Philological Association.
- Broughton, Thomas Robert Shannon (1952). The magistrates of the Roman republic. Vol. 2. New York: American Philological Association.
- Lintott, Andrew (2009) [First published 1999]. The constitution of the Roman Republic. Oxford: Clarendon Press. ISBN 978-0-19-815068-8. OCLC 39706770.
- Mommsen, Theodor (1864a). Römische Forschungen. Vol. 1.
- Mommsen, Theodor (1864b). "Über den princeps senatus". Rheinisches Museum für Philologie. 19: 455–457.
- Rafferty, David (2011). "Princeps senatus". Melbourne Historical Journal. 39 (2): 1–22. ISSN 0076-6232.
- Ryan, Francis X (1998). Rank and Participation in the Republican Senate. Franz Steiner Verlag. ISBN 3-5150-7093-1.
- Suolahti, Jaakko (1972). "Princeps senatus". Arctos. 7: 207–218.
- Willems, Pierre Gaspard Hubert (1878). Le Sénat de la République romaine. Vol. 1.
