= Lucius Cornelius Lentulus Lupus (consul 156 BC) =

Roman consul

Lucius Cornelius Lentulus Lupus (died 125 BC) served as a Roman consul in 156 BC alongside his colleague Gaius Marcius Figulus.

Lupus was a member of the Lentuli branch of the gens Cornelia, an elite patrician family. The Latin author Lucilius criticizes Lupus for a decadent and corrupt lifestyle. Lupus was a member of the priestly college decemviri sacris faciundis. He was charged with extortion, yet still became censor in 147 BC. From 131 to 125 BC he was the princeps senatus.

== Career ==
In 162 BC, Lentulus was sent with Tiberius Sempronius Gracchus as ambassadors to Greece and Asia Minor to ascertain the reaction of countries to the return of Demetrius, heir to the Seleucid Empire from exile. The secondary purpose of the mission was to negotiate an end to the war between Greece and Galatia. Ariarathes V, King of Cappadocia, received the envoys and rejected an alliance with Demetrius. However, with the support of the Roman Senate, Demetrius executed his cousin Antiochus V and became King Demetrius I.

In 159 BC, Lentulus served as praetor. In 156 BC, he served as consul together with Gaius Marcius Figulus as his colleague. In 154 BC, he was condemned for extortion. In 147 BC, however, he was appointed censor. In 131 BC, he was princeps senatus, a position he held until his death around 125 BC.

Preceded by Sextus Julius Caesar and Lucius Aurelius Orestes	Consul of the Roman Republic; 156 BC with Gaius Marcius Figulus	Succeeded by Publius Cornelius Scipio Nasica Corculum and Marcus Claudius Marcellus
