= Marcus Fabius Buteo =

Roman general and statesman, consul in 245 BC

Marcus Fabius Buteo (died around 210–209 BC) was a Roman politician during the 3rd century BC. He served as consul in 245 BC, and as censor, and in 216 BC, being the oldest living ex-censor, he was appointed dictator, legendo senatui, for the purpose of filling vacancies in the senate after the Battle of Cannae. He was appointed by the consul Varro, and, with M. Junius Pera, he was the only dictator to serve a simultaneous term with another. He resigned from the post immediately after he revised the censors' lists and enrolled the new Senate members.

By 210 BC to 209 BC, the censor Tuditanus among possible candidates for Princeps Senatus chose instead his kinsman Quintus Fabius Maximus Verrucosus. It is thought that Buteo would have earned this honor if he had been alive to accept it.

Political offices
Preceded by Manius Otacilius Crassus and Marcus Fabius Licinus	Consul of the Roman Republic with Gaius Atilius Bulbus; 245 BC	Succeeded by Aulus Manlius Torquatus Atticus and Gaius Sempronius Blaesus
