= Gaius Marcius Rutilus Censorinus =

Roman consul in 310 BC

Gaius Marcius Rutilus Censorinus was a Roman politician from the plebeian gens Marcia in the fourth and third centuries BC.

== Family ==
His father Gaius Marcius Rutilus served as consul four times in the years 357 - 342 BC.

== Career ==
Marcius served as tribune of the people in 311 BC. In 310, he was consul together with Quintus Fabius Maximus Rullianus. In that year, he fought against the Samnites and conquered Alifae in Campania, but was seriously wounded in a subsequent battle. In 300, he was named as one of the first plebeian pontiffs and as augur. He served as censor in 294 and 265 BC. He is said to have brought forward a law precluding anyone from holding the censorship more than twice in the future.

It is because of this law that he is attributed the cognomen Censorinus.

He was perhaps the first princeps senatus, appointed in 275 BC.
