= Following sea =

Wave direction that matches the heading of a vessel

A following sea refers to a wave direction that is similar to the heading of a waterborne vessel under way. The word "sea" in this context refers to open water wind waves.

In the strict sense, a following sea has a direction of propagation between 15° either side of vessel heading, and has a celerity that does not exceed the velocity of the vessel in the direction of wave propagation. If the wave moves faster than the vessel it is an overtaking sea. If the angle to vessel heading is more than 15° it may be a quartering sea.

== Usage ==
Sailors use this term synonymously with the points of sail below a beam reach, since the wind direction is generally the same as the sea direction. Therefore, the phrase "Fair winds and following seas," implies that a vessel will have good winds, and not have to pound into the waves. The phrase is now used as a popular toast or salutation between mariners. It is also used during ceremonies, such as the beginning of a voyage, a ship's commissioning, a retirement, funeral et cetera.

Following seas, combined with high winds (especially from the stern, or from behind the boat), can be dangerous and cause a boat to yaw (turn sideways) and swamp or plow under the wave ahead, if the winds and sea are too strong or violent. The original term may have been "Fair winds and a fallowing sea" where fallow means inactive. However, in the mariners' traditional toast or blessing a "following sea", combined with a "fair wind", to a sailor, implies that the winds are comfortable, the sailboat is "running", i.e. sailing with the wind on its stern, and the seas are comfortably rolling in the same direction as the boat is heading, so that the boat seems to be skimming easily on the surface of the water.

== See also ==
- Beam sea – A sea in which waves are moving perpendicular to a vessel's course
- Bow sea – Waves which approach a vessel at an angle between ahead and abeam
- Broach (nautical) – Abrupt, involuntary change in course
- Head sea – Waves approaching from ahead
- Quartering sea – A sea in which waves approach at an angle aft of abeam to a vessel's course
- Overtaking sea – A sea in which waves approach from astern at a speed faster than the vessel
- Breaking wave – Unstable wave
- Seakeeping – Response of a vessel to sea conditions
- Sea state – General condition of the free surface on a large body of water
