= Battle of the Aegates =

Carthage-Rome naval battle, 241 BCE

- Part of the First Punic War
Date	10 March 241 BC
Location	Aegates Islands, western Sicily 37.97°N 12.20°E
Result	Roman victory: Treaty of Lutatius

Belligerents
Roman Republic	Carthage

Commanders and leaders
Gaius Lutatius Catulus; Quintus Valerius Falto	Hanno

Strength
c. 200 quinqueremes	c. 250 quinqueremes

Casualties and losses
30 quinqueremes sunk 50 quinqueremes damaged	50 quinqueremes sunk 70 quinqueremes captured 10,000 men captured
- Location of the battle, off the west coast of Sicily

The Battle of the Aegates was a naval battle fought on 10 March 241 BC between the fleets of Carthage and Rome during the First Punic War. It took place among the Aegates Islands, off the western coast of the island of Sicily. The Carthaginians were commanded by Hanno, and the Romans were under the overall authority of Gaius Lutatius Catulus, but Quintus Valerius Falto commanded during the battle. It was the final and deciding battle of the 23-year-long First Punic War.

The Roman army had been blockading the Carthaginians in their last strongholds on the west coast of Sicily for several years. Almost bankrupt, the Romans borrowed money to build a naval fleet, which they used to extend the blockade to the sea. The Carthaginians assembled a larger fleet which they intended to use to run supplies into Sicily. It would then embark much of the Carthaginian army stationed there as marines. It was intercepted by the Roman fleet and in a hard-fought battle, the better-trained Romans defeated the undermanned and ill-trained Carthaginian fleet, which was further handicapped by being laden with supplies and having not yet embarked its full complement of marines.

As a direct result, Carthage sued for peace and agreed to the Treaty of Lutatius, by which Carthage surrendered Sicily to Rome and paid substantial reparations. Henceforth Rome was the leading military power in the western Mediterranean, and increasingly the Mediterranean region as a whole.

== Primary sources ==
The main source for almost every aspect of the First Punic War (Note: The term Punic comes from the Latin word Punicus (or Poenicus), meaning "Carthaginian", and is a reference to the Carthaginians' Phoenician ancestry.) is the historian Polybius (c. 200 – c. 118 BC), a Greek sent to Rome in 167 BC as a hostage. His works include a now-lost manual on military tactics, but he is known today for The Histories, written sometime after 146 BC, or about a century after the Battle of the Aegates. Polybius's work is considered broadly objective and largely neutral as between Carthaginian and Roman points of view.

Carthaginian written records were destroyed along with their capital, Carthage, in 146 BC and so Polybius's account of the First Punic War is based on several Greek and Latin sources which are now lost. Polybius was an analytical historian and wherever possible personally interviewed participants in the events he wrote about. Only the first book of the 40 comprising The Histories deals with the First Punic War. The accuracy of Polybius's account has been much debated over the past 150 years, but the modern consensus is to accept it largely at face value, and the details of the battle in modern sources are almost entirely based on interpretations of Polybius's account. The modern historian Andrew Curry considers that "Polybius turns out to [be] fairly reliable"; while Dexter Hoyos describes him as "a remarkably well-informed, industrious, and insightful historian". Other, later, histories of the war exist, but in fragmentary or summary form, and they usually cover military operations on land in more detail than those at sea. Modern historians usually also take into account the later histories of Diodorus Siculus and Dio Cassius, although the classicist Adrian Goldsworthy states that "Polybius' account is usually to be preferred when it differs with any of our other accounts". (Note: Sources other than Polybius are discussed by Bernard Mineo in "Principal Literary Sources for the Punic Wars (apart from Polybius)".)

Other sources include inscriptions, archaeological evidence, and empirical evidence from reconstructions such as the trireme Olympias. Since 2010 a number of artefacts have been recovered from the battle site, and their analysis and the recovery of further items are ongoing.

== Background ==
=== Operations in Sicily ===
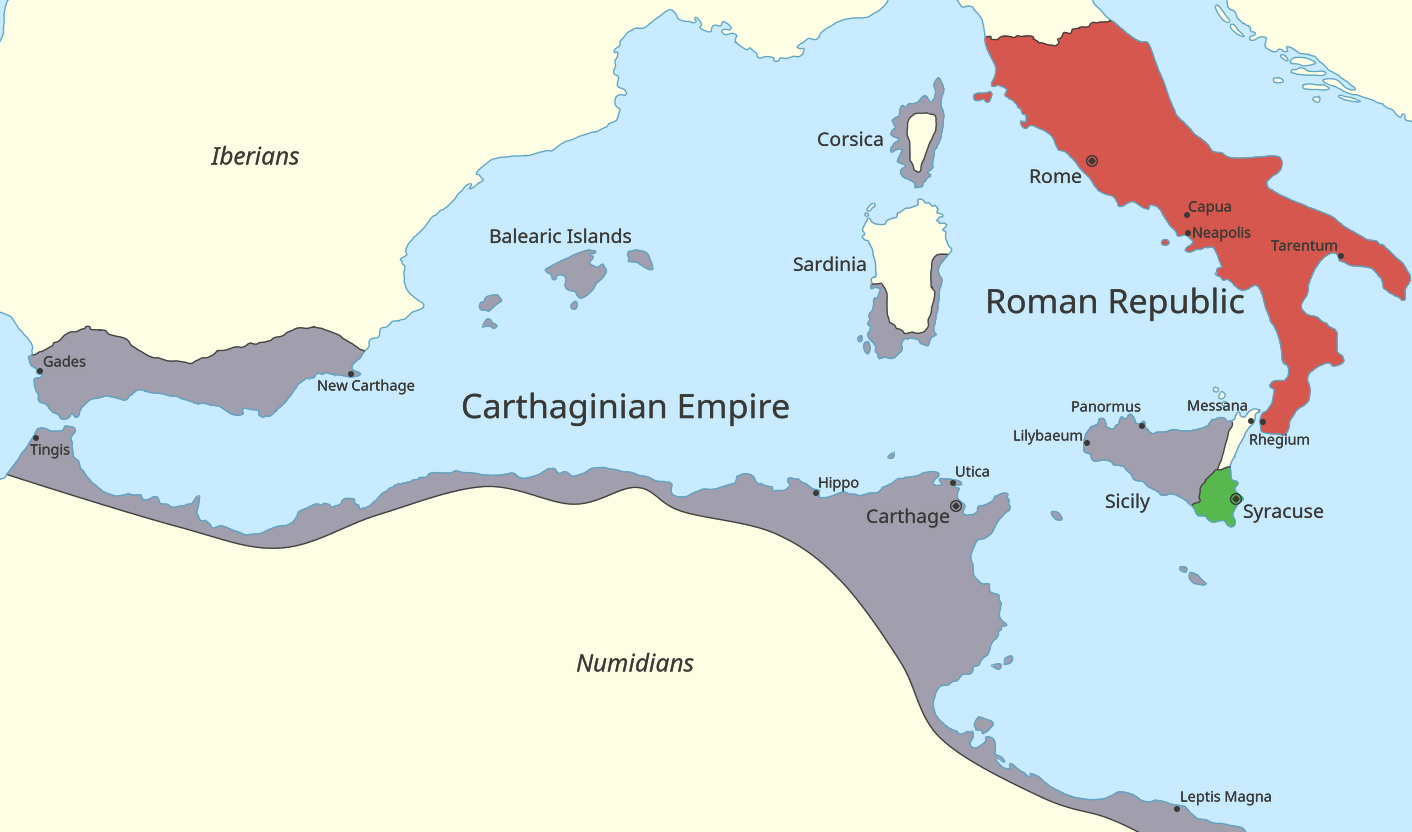
Territory controlled by Rome and Carthage at the start of the First Punic War

In 264 BC, the states of Carthage and Rome went to war, starting the First Punic War. Carthage was a well-established maritime power in the western Mediterranean; mainland Italy south of the River Arno had recently been unified under Roman control. The immediate cause of the war was control of the Sicilian town of Messana (modern Messina). More broadly both sides wished to control Syracuse, the most powerful city-state on Sicily.

=== Ships ===
During this period the standard Mediterranean warship was the quinquereme, meaning "five-oared". The quinquereme was a galley, c. 45 metres (150 ft) long, c. 5 metres (16 ft) wide at water level, with its deck standing c. 3 metres (10 ft) above the sea, and displacing around 100 tonnes (110 short tons; 100 long tons). The galley expert John Coates suggested that they could maintain 7 kn (8.1 mph; 13 km/h) for extended periods. The modern replica galley Olympias has achieved speeds of 8.5 kn (9.8 mph; 15.7 km/h) and cruised at 4 knots (4.6 mph; 7.4 km/h) for hours on end. Average speeds of 5–6 knots (5.8–6.9 mph; 9.3–11.1 km/h) were recorded on contemporary voyages of up to a week.

Vessels were built as cataphract, or "protected", ships, with a closed hull and a full deck able to carry marines and catapults. They had a separate "oar box" attached to the main hull which contained the rowers. These features allowed the hull to be strengthened, increased carrying capacity and improved conditions for the rowers. The generally accepted theory regarding the arrangement of oarsmen in quinqueremes is that there would be sets – or files – of three oars, one above the other, with two oarsmen on each of the two uppermost oars and one on the lower, for a total of five oarsmen per file. This would be repeated down the side of a galley for a total of 28 files on each side; 168 oars in total.

Depiction of the positions of the rowers of the three different oars in a Greek trireme

The Romans had little prior naval experience; on the few occasions they had previously felt the need for a naval presence they had usually relied on small squadrons provided by their Latin or Greek allies. In 260 BC the Romans set out to construct a fleet and used a shipwrecked Carthaginian quinquereme as a blueprint for their own. As novice shipwrights, the Romans built copies that were heavier than the Carthaginian vessels, and thus slower and less manoeuvrable. The quinquereme provided the workhorse of the Roman and Carthaginian fleets throughout the Punic Wars, although hexaremes (six oarsmen per bank), quadriremes (four oarsmen per bank) and triremes (three oarsmen per bank) are also occasionally mentioned. So ubiquitous was the type that Polybius uses it as a shorthand for "warship" in general. A quinquereme carried a crew of 300: 280 oarsmen and 20 deck crew and officers; it would also normally carry a complement of 40 marines; if battle was thought to be imminent this would be increased to as many as 120.

Getting the oarsmen to row as a unit, let alone to execute more complex battle manoeuvres, required long and arduous training. At least half of the oarsmen would need to have had some experience if the ship was to be handled effectively. As a result, the Romans were initially at a disadvantage against the more experienced Carthaginians. All warships were equipped with a ram, a triple set of 60-centimetre-wide (2 ft) bronze blades weighing up to 270 kilograms (600 lb) positioned at the waterline. Rams were made individually by the lost-wax method so as to fit immovably to a galley's prow, and secured with bronze spikes. Ideally one would attack an enemy ship from its side or rear, thus avoiding the possibility of being rammed oneself. Skill was required to collide with an opposing galley forcefully enough to break loose its timbers and cause it to founder, but not so forcefully as to embed one's own ram inextricably in the sinking enemy. Each vessel relied to a large extent on the other vessels in its squadron for protection, and tactics involved the manoeuvring of whole squadrons rather than individual ships; although battles sometimes broke down into a series of ship-on-ship combats which have been likened to aerial dogfights.

=== 264–250 BC ===
Largely because of the Romans' invention of the corvus, a device which enabled them to grapple and board enemy vessels more easily, the Carthaginians were defeated in large naval battles at Mylae (260 BC), Sulci (257 BC), Ecnomus (256 BC) and Cape Hermaeum (255 BC). Shortly after the last of these, the large majority of the Roman fleet was destroyed in a storm, with an estimated loss of 100,000 men; the instability of the Roman ships in heavy weather due to the presence of the corvus may have contributed to this disaster. In any event, they did not use the corvus thereafter. The Romans rapidly rebuilt their fleet, only to lose a further 150 ships to another storm in 253 BC. They rebuilt again, and in 250 BC blockaded the main Carthaginian base on Sicily of Lilybaeum with 200 warships.

The Carthaginians regained command of the sea in 249 BC with victories over the blockading Roman fleet at Drepana and Phintias. These defeats so demoralized the Romans that they restricted their naval activities to small-scale operations for seven years. The absence of Roman fleets probably led Carthage to gradually decommission most of her navy. Goldsworthy states that the Carthaginian navy became inactive and considers it likely that few ships were kept in commission. Certainly they withdrew most of their warships from Sicily. The Carthaginian leadership preferred to expand their area of control in North Africa at the expense of the native Numidians. Hanno the Great was put in charge of operations in Africa in 248 BC and went on to conquer considerable territory by 241 BC. The historian Nigel Bagnall considers that during this period Carthage viewed Sicily as a secondary theatre.

== Prelude ==
Carthage's foothold in western Sicily, 248–241 BC, in gold; Roman-controlled territory in pink; Syracusan in green

By 248 BC, the war had lasted 15 years, with many changes of fortune. It had developed into a struggle in which the Romans were attempting to decisively defeat the Carthaginians and, at a minimum, control the whole of Sicily. The Carthaginians were engaging in their traditional policy of waiting for their opponents to wear themselves out, in the expectation of then regaining some or all of their possessions and negotiating a mutually satisfactory peace treaty. Rome had gained control of most of Sicily and the Carthaginians retained only two cities on the island: Lilybaeum and Drepana; these were well-fortified and situated on the west coast, where they could be supplied and reinforced without the Romans being able to use their superior army to interfere.

When Hamilcar Barca (Note: Hamilcar Barca was the father of Hannibal.) took command of the Carthaginians on Sicily in 247 BC he was only given a small army and the Carthaginian fleet was gradually withdrawn. Hostilities between Roman and Carthaginian forces declined to small-scale land operations, which suited the Carthaginian strategy. Hamilcar employed combined arms tactics in a Fabian strategy from his base at Eryx, north of Drepana. This guerrilla warfare kept the Roman legions pinned down and preserved Carthage's foothold in Sicily.

Early in the blockade of Lilybaeum and Drepana, 50 Carthaginian quinqueremes gathered off the Aegates Islands, which lie 15–40 kilometres (9.3–24.9 mi) to the west of Sicily. Once there was a strong west wind they sailed into Lilybaeum before the Romans could react. They unloaded reinforcements – either 4,000 or 10,000 according to different ancient sources – and a large quantity of supplies. They evaded the Romans by leaving at night, evacuating the Carthaginian cavalry. The Romans had sealed off the landward approach to Lilybaeum with earth and timber camps and walls, and now made repeated attempts to block the harbour entrance with a heavy timber boom; due to the prevailing sea conditions they were unsuccessful. The two Carthaginian garrisons were kept supplied by blockade runners. These were light and manoeuvrable quinqueremes with highly trained crews and pilots who knew the shoals and currents of the difficult waters. Chief among the blockade runners was a galley captained by Hannibal the Rhodian, who taunted the Romans with the superiority of his vessel and crew. Eventually the Romans captured Hannibal, and his well-constructed galley.

By 243 BC, after more than 20 years of war, both states were financially and demographically exhausted. Evidence of Carthage's financial situation includes their request for a 2,000-talent loan (Note: 2,000 talents was approximately 52,000 kg (51 long tons) of silver.) from Ptolemaic Egypt, which was refused. Rome was also close to bankruptcy and the number of adult male citizens, who provided the manpower for the navy and the legions, had declined by 17 per cent since the start of the war.

== New Roman fleet ==
In late 243 BC, realizing they would not capture Drepana and Lilybaeum unless they could extend their blockade to the sea, the Roman Senate decided to build a new fleet. With the state's coffers exhausted, the Senate approached Rome's wealthiest citizens for loans to finance the construction of one ship each, repayable from the reparations to be imposed on Carthage once the war was won, and to donate slaves as oarsmen. The result was a fleet of approximately 200 quinqueremes, built, equipped, and crewed without government expense. The Romans modelled the ships of their new fleet on the vessel captured from Hannibal the Rhodian. By now, the Romans were experienced at shipbuilding and with a proven vessel as a model produced high-quality quinqueremes. Importantly, the corvus was abandoned, which improved the ships' speed and handling but forced a change in tactics on the Romans; they would need to be superior sailors, rather than superior soldiers, to beat the Carthaginians.

The new Roman fleet was completed in 242 BC and the consul Gaius Lutatius Catulus, assisted by the praetor Quintus Valerius Falto, led it to Sicily. Arriving with the 200 quinqueremes and 700 transports laden with supplies and legionary reinforcements, Catulus seized the harbour of Drepana and the anchorages off Lilybaeum uncontested, as there were no Carthaginian ships to counter the Roman fleet. Catulus and Falto kept a strong squadron off each city whenever the weather permitted, to avoid any possibility of Carthaginian supplies getting past them, and to drill the crews in manoeuvres and exercises. They also ensured that the crews received good treatment, including an adequate diet, and created a fleet with crews at the peak of their ability. Impressed by the energy of Catulus and Falto, the Senate extended their terms of office beyond the normal one year, and they thus became proconsul and propraetor respectively.

The garrisons of Lilybaeum and Drepana – and Hamilcar's army at Eryx – held fast, but without supplies from Carthage they could not hold out indefinitely. Carthage began to ready a fleet, fit out transports, gather supplies and train crews and marines to meet the Roman challenge. It took nine months to ready 250 warships and between 150 and 350 transports. Carthage was pressed for time as supplies in their blockaded strongholds were running out. They struggled to find the 100,000 men necessary to fully crew just the warships, and did not have sufficient time to provide the extended training necessary for the crews to work together effectively as teams.

== Battle ==
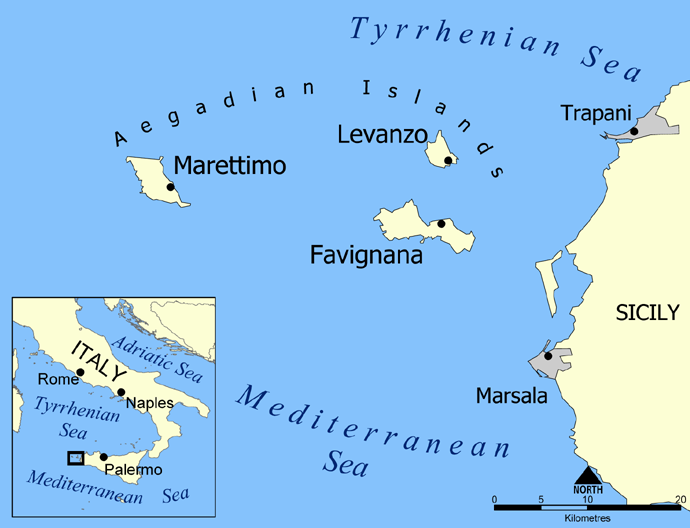
The Aegates Islands

The Carthaginian fleet was led by a commander named Hanno; he is distinguished from other Carthaginians named Hanno by being known as the son of Hannibal. This is possibly the general who had lost the Battles of Agrigentum and Ecnomus; although the historian John Lazenby considers it likely that he had been executed for his earlier failures. It is not known why the victors of Drepana, Adherbal and Carthalo, were not in command. The Carthaginian plan was to assemble their fleet of 250 quinqueremes and a large but unknown number of transports in secret off Hiera (Holy Island), the westernmost of the Aegates islands. There they would wait for a following wind, and rely on surprise and numbers to take them the 45 km (28 mi) to Lilybaeum before the Romans became aware and concentrated their fleet. This would have been a repeat of the successful Carthaginian feat with a smaller fleet several years before. They would then unload their cargoes, mostly grain, and embark much of the Carthaginian army to be used as marines on their quinqueremes. These would then configure themselves for fighting and seek out the Roman fleet. It is unclear, given the many transports available, why the Carthaginian warships were also laden with cargo; and why they were not already carrying marines taken from their forces in Africa. The Carthaginian fleet arrived off Hiera in early March 241 BC.

The Carthaginian fleet was spotted by Roman scouts and Catulus abandoned the blockade. He took a full complement of soldiers from the besieging Roman army to act as marines on board his 200 quinqueremes. The Roman fleet then sailed and anchored off the island of Aegusa (modern Favignana), 16 km (10 mi) from Sicily. Next morning, 10 March, the wind was blowing strongly from the west, and the current was running the same way. Hanno immediately set sail. Catulus measured the risk of attacking with the wind in his bow versus the risk of letting Hanno reach Sicily to relieve Lilybaeum, Drepana and Hamilcar's army at Eryx. Despite the unfavourable conditions, the proconsul decided to intercept the Carthaginians and ordered his fleet to prepare for battle. He had the Roman ships stripped of their masts, sails and other unnecessary equipment to make them more seaworthy in the rough conditions. Catulus himself was unable to join the battle because of injuries suffered in an earlier engagement, so in the battle the ships were commanded by his second in command, Falto.

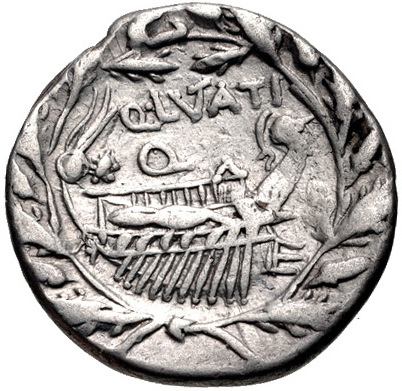
A Roman coin from 109 BC alluding to Catalus's victory; it shows a galley within a wreath of oak leaves.

The opposing fleets met to the west of the island of Phorbantia (modern Levanzo). Many fragments of lead anchors have been recovered from near the island of Levanzo, causing the archaeologist Sebastiano Tusa to speculate that the Roman fleet paused here and that its ships then deliberately cut their anchors, to reduce the weight they carried (each anchor weighed 270 kg (600 lb).). The Romans formed a single line of ships and rowed into the wind, through a heavy swell, towards the Carthaginians. Having little choice, the Carthaginians lowered their sails and engaged.

In the ensuing battle the Romans enjoyed far greater mobility, since their vessels were carrying only the bare necessities, while the Carthaginians were burdened with the equipment necessary for sustained travel and provisions for the Sicilian garrisons. The Carthaginian crews had also been hurriedly levied and so were inexperienced, and their ships were short of marines, as it had been intended that these would be supplemented from Hamilcar's soldiers. It was the second time that a Roman fleet had fought the Carthaginians without employing the corvus – the first time, at the Battle of Drepana, they were badly beaten – but they quickly gained the upper hand, using their ships' greater manoeuvrability to ram the Carthaginian vessels. The Roman ships were a match for their opponents, modelled as they were on one of the best of the Carthaginians', and their crews were superior. The Romans sank 50 Carthaginian ships, 20 of them with all hands, and 70 were captured along with 10,000 men. However, the battle was hard-fought, and the Romans lost 30 ships sunk and another 50 damaged. The rest of the Carthaginian fleet was saved only by an abrupt change in the direction of the wind, allowing them to flee; as the Romans had left their masts, sails and rigging ashore, they were unable to pursue. The Carthaginian remnants returned to Carthage, where their unsuccessful commander was crucified.

== Aftermath ==
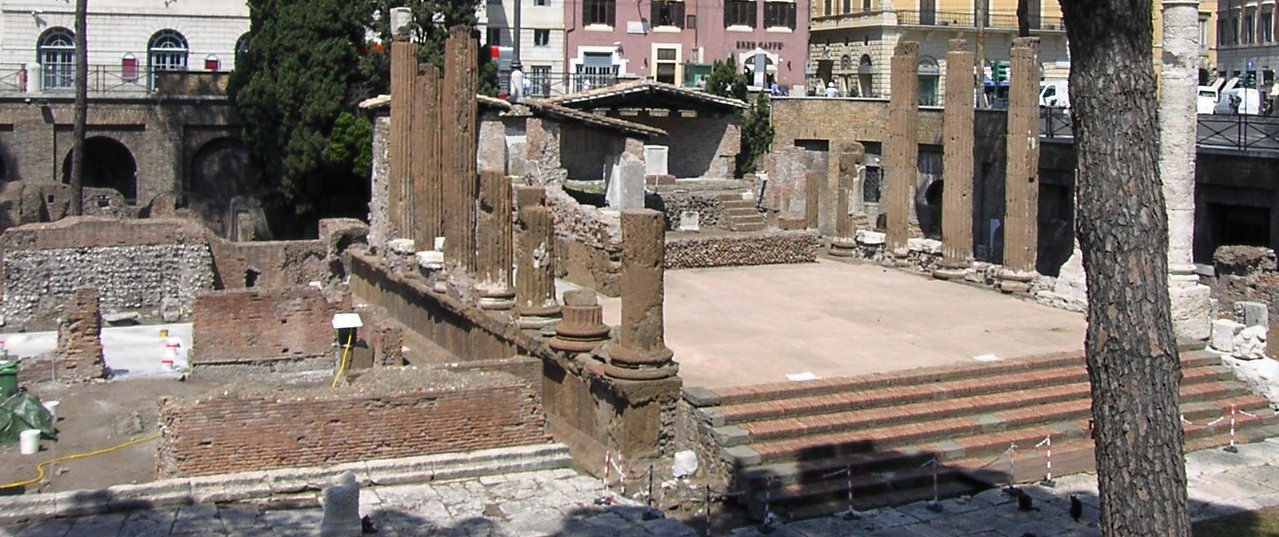
Remains of the Temple of Juturna at Largo di Torre Argentina, built by Gaius Lutatius Catulus to celebrate his victory

Catulus was granted a triumph to celebrate his victory, while Falto was granted a separate and slightly junior triumph. To celebrate the victory, Catulus built a temple to Juturna in the Campus Martius, in the area of Rome currently known as the Largo di Torre Argentina.

After achieving this decisive victory over the Carthaginian fleet, Catulus continued the land operations in Sicily against Lilybaeum, Eryx and Drepana; which continued to be defended by Hamilcar Barca and his army. The Carthaginian Senate was reluctant to allocate the resources necessary to have another fleet built and manned. Carthage had taken nine months to fit out the fleet that was defeated, and if they took another nine months to ready another fleet, the Sicilian cities still holding out would run out of supplies and request terms. Strategically, therefore, Carthage would have to build a fleet capable of defeating the Roman fleet, and then raise an army capable of defeating the Roman armies in Sicily. Instead, the Carthaginian Senate ordered Hamilcar to negotiate a peace treaty with the Romans, which he left up to his subordinate commander, Gisco. The Treaty of Lutatius was signed in the same year as the Battle of the Aegates and brought the First Punic War to its end; Carthage evacuated Sicily, handed over all prisoners taken during the war, and paid an indemnity of 3,200 talents (Note: 3,200 talents was approximately 82,000 kg (81 long tons) of silver.) over ten years.

Henceforth Rome was the leading military power in the western Mediterranean, and increasingly the Mediterranean region as a whole. The Romans had built over 1,000 galleys during the war; and this experience of building, manning, training, supplying and maintaining such numbers of ships laid the foundation for Rome's maritime dominance for 600 years.

== Marine archaeology ==
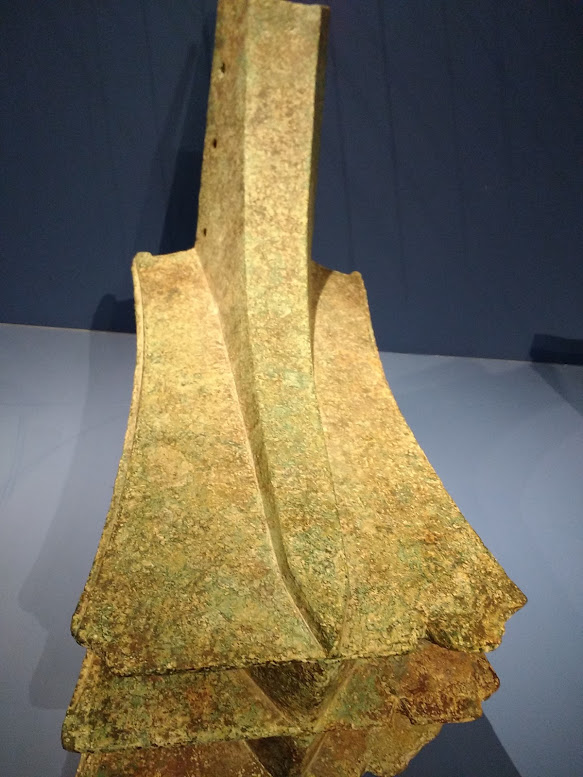
A Carthaginian naval ram recovered from the site of the battle showing damage in the form of V-shaped scratches, attributed to frontal collision(s) with a Roman ship – ram against ram

Beginning in 2010 and as of April 2026, twenty-seven bronze warship rams have been found by archaeologists in the sea off the west coast of Sicily. Ten bronze helmets and hundreds of amphorae have also been found. The rams, seven of the helmets, and six intact amphorae, along with a number of fragments, have since been recovered. Inscriptions allowed four of the rams to be identified as coming from Roman-built ships, one from a Carthaginian vessel, with the origins of the others being unknown. It is possible that some of the Roman-built vessels had been captured by the Carthaginians earlier in the war and were crewed by them when they were sunk. It is believed that the rams were each attached to a sunken warship when they were deposited on the seabed.

Six of the helmets were of the Montefortino type typically used by the legions, three with one or both bronze cheek pieces still attached; the seventh, badly corroded, was of a different design and may be Carthaginian. The archaeologists involved stated that the location of artefacts so far discovered supports Polybius's account of where the battle took place. Based on the dimensions of the recovered rams, the archaeologists who have studied them believe that they all came from triremes, contrary to Polybius's account of all of the warships involved being quinqueremes. However, they believe that the many amphora identified confirm that the Carthaginian ships were laden with supplies.

== Notes, citations and sources ==
=== Sources ===
- Bagnall, Nigel (1999). The Punic Wars: Rome, Carthage and the Struggle for the Mediterranean. London: Pimlico. ISBN 978-0-7126-6608-4.
- Bringmann, Klaus (2007). A History of the Roman Republic. Cambridge; Malden, Massachusetts: Polity. ISBN 978-0-7456-3371-8.
- Casson, Lionel (1991). The Ancient Mariners (2nd ed.). Princeton, New Jersey: Princeton University Press. ISBN 978-0-691-06836-7.
- Casson, Lionel (1995). Ships and Seamanship in the Ancient World. Baltimore: Johns Hopkins University Press. ISBN 978-0-8018-5130-8.
- Coates, John F. (1995). "The Naval Architecture and Oar Systems of Ancient Galleys". In Morrison, John S.; Gardiner, Robert (eds.). The Age of the Galley: Mediterranean Oared Vessels Since Pre-Classical Times. London: Conway Maritime Press. pp. 127–141. ISBN 0-85177-554-3.
- Crawford, Michael (1974). Roman Republican Coinage. Cambridge: Cambridge University Press. OCLC 859598398.
- Curry, Andrew (2012). "The Weapon That Changed History". Archaeology. 65 (1): 32–37. JSTOR 41780760.
- Dart, Christopher J.; Vervaet, Frederik J. (2011). "The Significance of the Naval Triumph in Roman History (260–29 BCE)". Zeitschrift für Papyrologie und Epigraphik. 176. Dr. Rudolf Habelt GmbH: 267–280. JSTOR 41291126.
- Erdkamp, Paul (2015) [2011]. "Manpower and Food Supply in the First and Second Punic Wars". In Hoyos, Dexter (ed.). A Companion to the Punic Wars. Chichester, West Sussex: John Wiley & Sons. pp. 58–76. ISBN 978-1-1190-2550-4.
- Goldsworthy, Adrian (2006). The Fall of Carthage: The Punic Wars 265–146 BC. London: Phoenix. ISBN 978-0-304-36642-2.
- Chisholm, Hugh, ed. (1911). "Juturna" . Encyclopædia Britannica. Vol. 15 (11th ed.). Cambridge University Press. pp. 609–610.
- Hau, Lisa Irene (2016). Moral History from Herodotus to Diodorus Siculus. Edinburgh: Edinburgh University Press. ISBN 978-1-4744-1107-3.
- Hoyos, Dexter (2015) [2011]. A Companion to the Punic Wars. Chichester, West Sussex: John Wiley & Sons. ISBN 978-1-1190-2550-4.
- Lazenby, John Francis (1996). The First Punic War: A Military History. Stanford, California: Stanford University Press. ISBN 0-8047-2673-6. (registration required)
- Meijer, Fik (1986). A History of Seafaring in the Classical World. London; Sydney: Croom and Helm. ISBN 978-0-7099-3565-0.
- Miles, Richard (2011). Carthage Must be Destroyed. London: Penguin. ISBN 978-0-14-101809-6.
- Mineo, Bernard (2015) [2011]. "Principal Literary Sources for the Punic Wars (apart from Polybius)". In Hoyos, Dexter (ed.). A Companion to the Punic Wars. Chichester, West Sussex: John Wiley. pp. 111–127. ISBN 978-1-1190-2550-4.
- Murray, William M. (2011). The Age of Titans: The Rise and Fall of the Great Hellenistic Navies. Oxford: Oxford University Press. ISBN 978-0-19-993240-5.
- Murray, William (2019). "The Ship Classes of the Egadi Rams and Polybius' Account of the First Punic War". Society for Classical Studies.
- Prag, Jonathan (2013). "Rare Bronze Rams Excavated from Site of the Final Battle of the First Punic War". University of Oxford media site. University of Oxford. Archived from the original on 1 October 2013.
- Rankov, Boris (2015) [2011]. "A War of Phases: Strategies and Stalemates". In Hoyos, Dexter (ed.). A Companion to the Punic Wars. Oxford: John Wiley & Sons. pp. 149–166. ISBN 978-1-1190-2550-4.
- Royal, Jeffrey G.; Tusa, Sebastiano, eds. (2019). The Site of the Battle of the Aegates Islands at the End of the First Punic War. Fieldwork, Analyses and Perspectives, 2005–2015. Bibliotheca Archaeologica. Vol. 60. L'Erma di Bretschneider. ISBN 978-88-913-1835-0.
- "Battle of the Egadi Islands Project". RPM Nautical Foundation. 2020.
- Shutt, R.J.H. (1938). "Polybius: A Sketch". Greece & Rome. 8 (22): 50–57. doi:10.1017/S001738350000588X. JSTOR 642112. S2CID 162905667.
- Sidwell, Keith C.; Jones, Peter V. (1998). The World of Rome: an Introduction to Roman Culture. Cambridge: Cambridge University Press. ISBN 978-0-521-38600-5.
- Smith, William (1870). Dictionary of Greek and Roman biography and mythology. Vol. 2. Boston: Little, Brown. OCLC 246156957.
- de Souza, Philip (2008). "Naval Forces". In Sabin, Philip; van Wees, Hans & Whitby, Michael (eds.). The Cambridge History of Greek and Roman Warfare, Volume 1: Greece, the Hellenistic World and the Rise of Rome. Cambridge: Cambridge University Press. pp. 357–367. ISBN 978-0-521-85779-6.
- Tipps, G.K. (1985). "The Battle of Ecnomus". Historia: Zeitschrift für Alte Geschichte. 34 (4): 432–465. JSTOR 4435938.
- Tusa, Sebastiano; Royal, Jeffrey (2012). "The Landscape of the Naval Battle at the Egadi Islands (241 B.C.)" (PDF). Journal of Roman Archaeology. 25. Cambridge University Press: 7–48. doi:10.1017/S1047759400001124. ISSN 1047-7594. S2CID 159518193. Archived from the original (PDF) on 26 April 2020.
- Walbank, F.W. (1990). Polybius. Vol. 1. Berkeley: University of California Press. ISBN 978-0-520-06981-7.
- Warmington, Brian Herbert (1993) [1960]. Carthage. New York: Barnes & Noble. ISBN 978-1-56619-210-1.
