= Quintus Lutatius Cerco =

Roman politician (died 236 BC)

Quintus Lutatius Cerco (died 236 BC) was a Roman politician in the third century BC.

== Family ==
He was a member of gens Lutatia. Gaius Lutatius Catulus, consul in 242 BC, was his brother.

== Career ==
In 241 BC, he was elected consul together with Aulus Manlius Torquatus Atticus as his colleague. In this year, the First Punic War ended with the victory of the Romans. Lutatius then triumphed over the revolt of the Falisci, destroying their city Falerii and resettling them to Falerii Novi. He was in charge of the administration of the new Roman Province of Sicily that had been ceded by Carthage to Rome.

In 236 BC, he served as Censor, dying in that position.
