= Meninx (town) =

- Location within Tunisia
- 33.685817°N 10.922214°E
- Type: Ancient city
- Location: Southeastern coast of Djerba, Médenine Governorate, Tunisia
- Region: Southern Tunisia

Meninx is a Tunisian archaeological site located on the southeastern coast of the island of Djerba, at the end of the route that connects it to the mainland. The site extends over two kilometres in length and eight hundred metres in width, part of which was probably submerged by the sea.

Originally, it was a commercial trading post founded by the Phoenicians. The city reached its peak during the Roman period, when it became the administrative centre of the island. Urban life continued there until the Byzantine period, in the 6th century.

== Ancient testimonies ==
The earliest name of the city seems to go back to Menis, a name that may refer to the scarcity of water on the island, before being transformed under Greek influence into Meninx (Μῆνιγξ), in accordance with a word meaning the membrane.

The city is mentioned in the writings of several ancient geographers and historians. The island of Meninx appears in a large number of Greek and Latin sources from the Homeric period onward.

Homer (8th century BC, Ionia) recounts that Odysseus and his men land in the country of the Lotus-eaters, where the inhabitants offer them the lotus, which makes anyone who eats it forget everything. Odysseus then has to force his men back to the ships to prevent them from staying there forever.

Scylax of Caryanda (6th century BC, Caria (Caryanda) mentions an island called Brachion (Βραχείων), three hundred stadia long and somewhat less wide; it lies about three stadia from the mainland. On the island grows the lotus, which is eaten, and another tree from which wine is produced. The fruit of the lotus is, in size, that of a small quince. A great deal of oil is also produced there from olive trees. The island yields an abundant harvest: wheat and barley; it is a fertile island.

Theophrastus (d. 288 BC, Eresos) reports an important fact: the army of Ophelas, on its march towards Carthage, had to subsist for several days thanks to the lotus; he also attributes to the island a name otherwise unknown, Bagis, or Pharide in another source.

Eratosthenes (d. 194 BC, Cyrene) calls it the island of the lotus-eaters .

Apollodorus of Athens (d. 120 BC, Athens) recounts the same story, stating that the lotus is a sweet fruit that makes those who eat it forget the way home.

Polybius (d. 120 BC, Megalopolis) reports that two Roman consuls, Gnaeus Servilius Caepio and Gaius Sempronius Blaesus, arrived on the island of the Lotus-eaters, called Meninx, where their ships ran aground because of the shallow waters.

Livy (d. AD 17, Padua) reports that the consul Cnaeus Servilius Geminus attacked the island of Meninx and ravaged it before crossing over to Africa, and that the inhabitants of Cercina paid him ten talents of silver to avoid the same fate.

Strabo (d. AD 24, Amasya) states that the people of the lotus-eaters inhabit one of the two islands facing the Lesser Syrtis, namely the island of Meninx.

Pliny the Elder (d. AD 79, Como) describes the island of Meninx as the most famous of the islands in that sea, twenty‑five miles long and twenty‑two wide, and states that it contains two cities: Meninx (Meningem) on the side facing Africa, and Thoar or Troas on the other side. He adds that it is known under the names Zerbi and Jerba, derived from the name Girba, which had already replaced that of Meninx by the time of Aurelius Victor. He also notes that the finest African purple dye came from Meninx and from the regions of Gaetulia near the ocean.

Pomponius Mela (1st century AD, Spain) notes that, opposite the headlands of the Lesser Syrtis coast, lie the two islands of Meninx and Cercina.

The poet Silius Italicus (d. AD 101, Italy) states in his epic:

These are warriors hardened in the camps, nourished by the sap of the noble tree and the sweet berry of the lotus, a plant all too hospitable [...] At the head of these thousands of men stands Choaspes, a commander seasoned in war, born in Meninx and of Ithacan origin [like Odysseus and his companions]; his right hand always hurled the tragula, a famous javelin that struck like lightning.

Plutarch (d. AD 125, Chaeronea) mentions that Gaius Marius crossed the sea to the island of Meninx, where he first learned of the flight of his son with Cethegus, as well as his departure to seek the assistance of Hiempsal I, king of Numidia.

Solinus reports that the Roman fleet crossed the shoals of this region without difficulty, and that Gaius Marius hid on the island of Meninx after leaving the marshes of Minturnae.

The anonymous author of the Stadiasmus Maris Magni (2nd century AD) states that the distance between the island of the lotus-eaters (Meninx) and the island of Cercina is 750 stadia, that Strabo considered it the same island mentioned by Homer, and that it possessed an altar dedicated to Odysseus as well as the lotus plant itself. He adds that there are 150 stadia between Gergis and Meninx, that the island lies eight stadia from the mainland, that it contains several cities, that this one is the metropolis, and that it has an altar dedicated to Odysseus, the largest bearing that name; he also notes that the island of Meninx is connected to the mainland by a bridge or stone causeway.

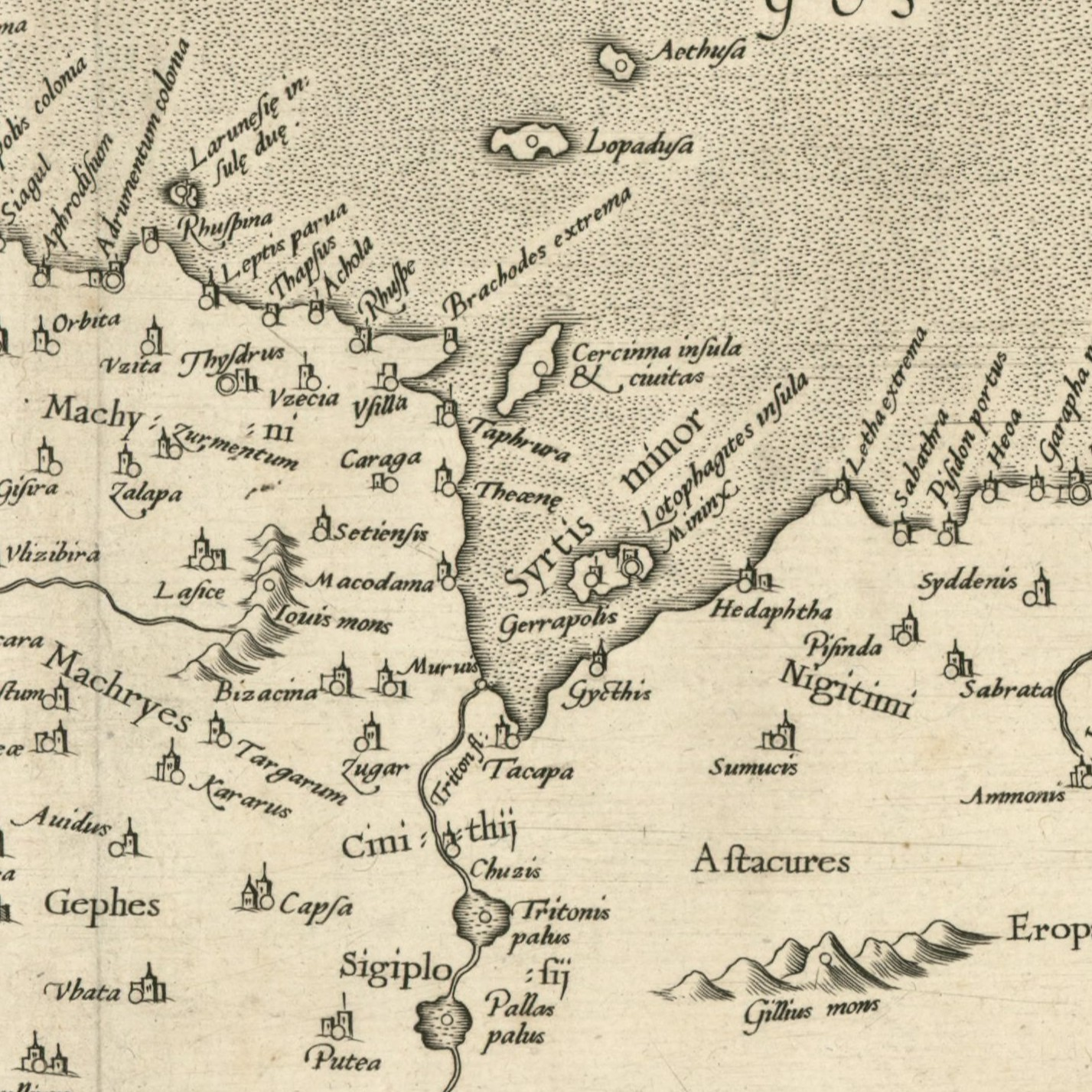
The island of the Lotus-eaters on Ptolemy’s map

Claudius Ptolemy (d. AD 168, Alexandria) mentions the island of the lotus-eaters, in which are found two cities, including Gérra (Γέρρα) and Meninx.

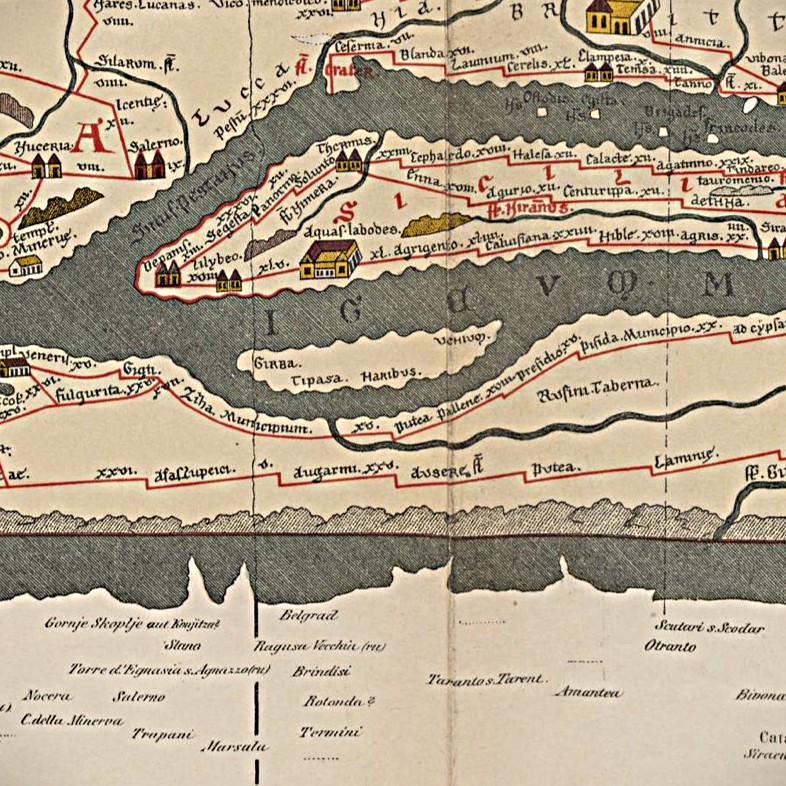
Tabula Peutingeriana

On the Tabula Peutingeriana (4th–5th c. Roman / medieval copy), only four cities appear: Uchim, Tipasa, Haribus and Girba , while Meninx does not appear.

Aurelius Victor (4th century AD, Roman Africa) notes that Aemilianus, of Moorish origin, was born in Girba and proclaimed emperor in AD 253. He also states that Trebonianus Gallus and his son Volusianus were proclaimed emperors on the island of Meninx, today called Girba.

Stephanus of Byzantium (6th century AD, Constantinople) states that Meninx is an island near the Syrtes, that its name also applies to the city, and that the derived adjective is *Meninxios*.

== History of excavations ==
Edmond Pellissier de Reynaud reported in 1853 the existence of ruins located in the southeast of the island, which he described as simple, confused heaps of debris. Members of the Ben Ayed family then undertook excavations there in order to extract materials for the construction of a house — today known as Ksar Ben Ayad — and uncovered several parts of a vast building, interpreted as a temple or a palace, where marble appeared in abundance. The discoveries included column shafts, capitals, richly decorated friezes, marble plaques intended for wall facing, two colossal headless white‑marble statues — representing an emperor and an empress — as well as an inscription engraved on a pedestal.

In 1860, Victor Guérin described the remains of a vast city surrounded by an enclosure of about five kilometres in perimeter, including a fortified castle, cisterns, columns and statues. He also noted that English visitors were taking precious marbles from the site, while the kaïd Saïd Ben Ayed used fine materials for the construction of his palace.

In 1882, two notes were submitted to the Académie des inscriptions et belles-lettres by Marie Henry Charles Hussenet, chief physician residing in Djerba. The first reports excavations carried out in the ruins of ancient Meninx by a detachment of the 78th infantry regiment, under the supervision of Lieutenant Le Hello, concerning a basilica located at the eastern end of the site, about 1,500 m from a large temple. The second note discusses two Christian buildings of Gaul located at Girba (Meninx), attributed to the Roman or Byzantine period, accompanied by two plans drawn by Lieutenant Le Hello.

In 1884, Charles-Joseph Tissot observed that the island of Djerba was the object of numerous visits and excavations, and reported among the discoveries a large marble baptistery, red‑sandstone statues, and a mosaic depicting four horses with plumed heads.

In 1885, Jean-Marie Brulard reported a legend according to which the name of Djerba derived from a highly venerated golden statue discovered in a now‑ruined church west of El‑Kantara, dating from the period when the region was occupied by the Greeks. He also described the ruins of Meninx, where a few sections of the enclosing wall remained, along with a Roman bordj, the remains of baths, several well‑preserved cisterns, and various fragments of sacred and secular buildings.

In 1888, Lieutenant Jean Servonnet and Dr. Fernand Lafitte revisited these observations and added that a large part of the antiquities of El‑Kantara, half buried in the sand, had recently been removed by the French aviso *d’Estrée* and transported to Tunis for the new Bardo National Museum. Among these pieces were eight marble statues, including two monumental ones, all mutilated and missing their heads, hands, and feet. The inhabitants of Djerba reported that in 1862 or 1863, English officers had detached these parts to take them away. A Byzantine baptistery was also transferred to La Goulette in 1884 by the gunboat *L’Étendard*. The blocks, deposited in bulk, remained on site for seven years before they could be transported to the Bardo.

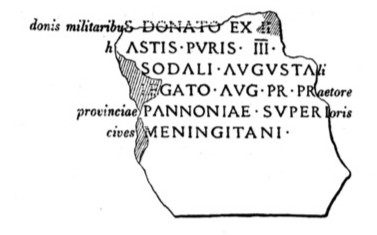
Inscription Meningitani (Djerba)

In a mosque in Sedouikech, Mr. Hartmayer, civil controller of Djerba, discovered an inscription on two fragments of a white‑marble plaque reading: --- donis / militaribus] donato exped[itione] [Dacica prima h]astis puris III [uexillis III ---/---] sodali Augusta[li --- le]gato Augusti] pr[o praetore) [--- --- provinciae] Pannoniae super[ioris ------]: Menintigani This is a dedication in honour of a legate and propraetor of the province of Upper Pannonia, offered by the *cives Menintigani*. It most likely refers to Lucius Minicius Natalis, consul in AD 106 and legate of the Third Augustan Legion between 103 and 105. This text is, so far, the only one to mention the name of the inhabitants of Meninx: *Meningitani*.,

Between 1892 and 1904, Paul Gauckler likely undertook the first systematic excavations at Meninx, including the preliminary clearing of the two Christian basilicas, and published two plates depicting the churches of Henchir El Kanatara (Meninx) and Henchir Boumerdes.

In 1908, François Gendre observed that the ruins of ancient Meninx yielded numerous marble fragments — capitals, cornices, columns, statues — as well as an important group of cisterns, some of them reworked, traces of mosaics, and the remains of a basilica.

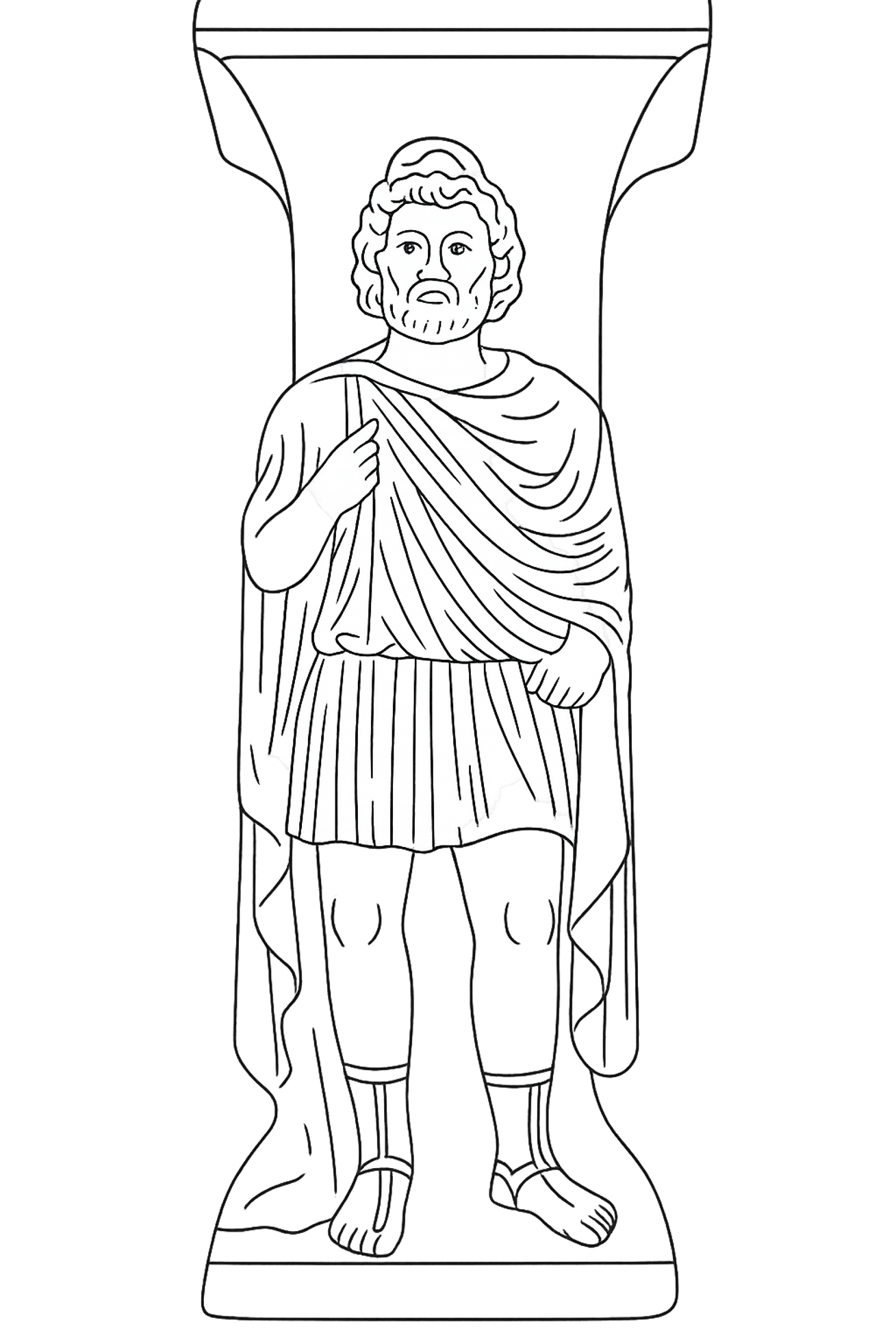
Pillar from Meninx (Louvre Museum collection)

In 1942, Paul-Marie Duval resumed excavations and noted the absence of ramparts. He identified the remains of two bath complexes, an amphitheatre located 400 m from the city, two basilicas previously roughly cleared by Gauckler, and a large esplanade probably linked to the forum. He also recalled that in 1901, eight sculpted pillars in pink limestone had been transported to the Bardo Museum. The excavations also uncovered various remarkable architectural fragments — notable for their material, colours and decoration — including a row of twelve columns (six still in place), elements of two cornices, and five fragments depicting figures leaning against pillars, very likely “barbarians”.

Between 1996 and 2001, a Tunisian–American team carried out field surveys of the island and several test pits, notably at Meninx. The occupation and economic activity of the city — based on agriculture and the production of purple dye — were clarified for the ancient period.

Since 2015, a Tunisian–German team has been conducting geophysical surveys and archaeological excavations on the site. A development operation and a project for an archaeological park were also launched in 2018, following a partnership between LMU Munich and the National Heritage Institute.

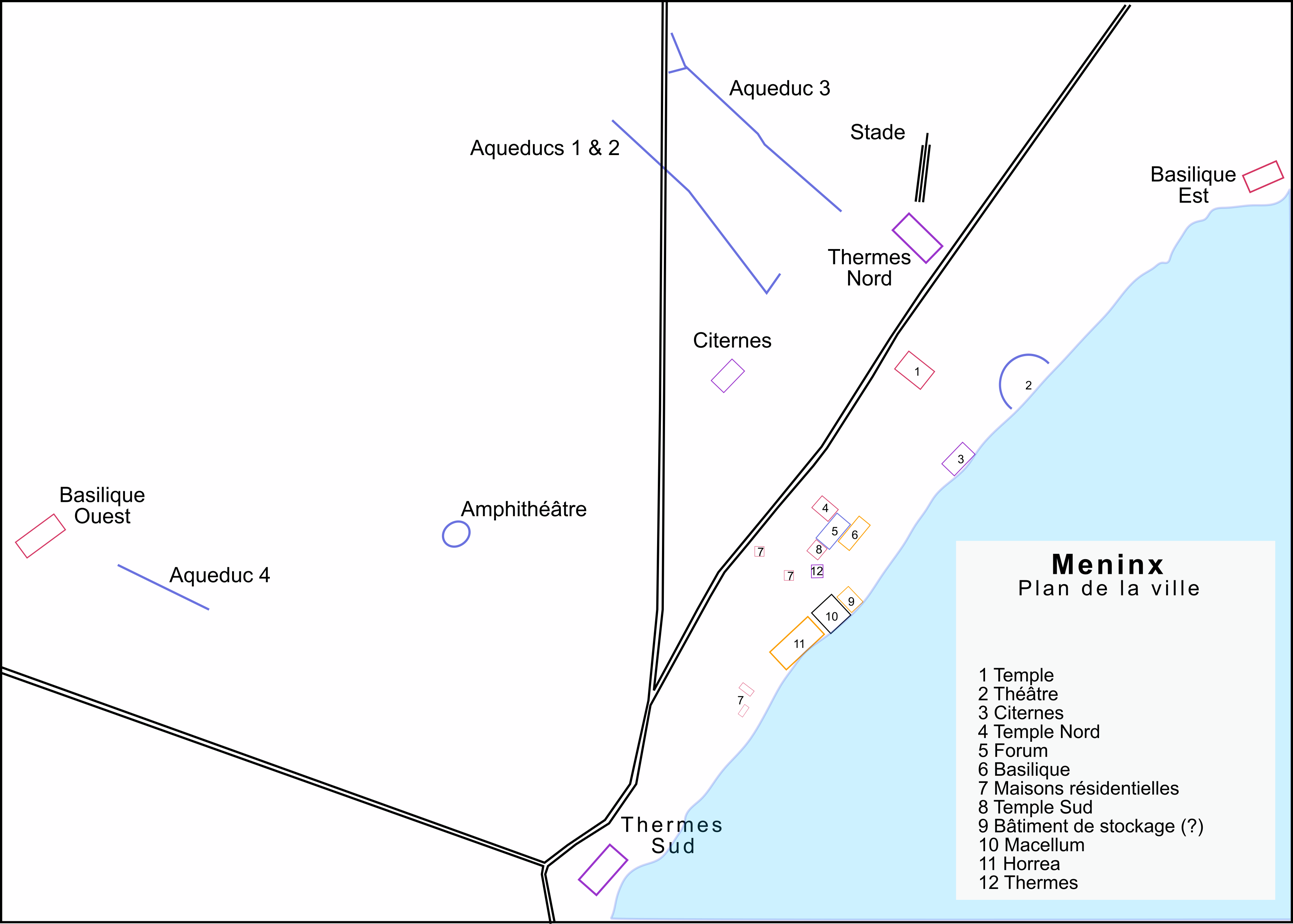
Map of the site of Meninx on the southeastern coast of Djerba.

== Architecture and urban spaces ==
=== The road network and urban zones of Meninx ===
==== Road network ====
The urban layout of Meninx is structured by several major roads running parallel to the coastline. The first, closest to the shore, crosses the surveyed area from the southwest, runs along the macellum and behind the Forum basilica, then heads toward the theatre, where it abruptly turns inland. A second road, located 60 to 90 metres further north, begins at the Forum square, passes behind the theatre, and continues northeast, curving slightly toward the coast. A third road, visible only in the northern sector, starts behind a temple west of the theatre and then follows a path parallel to the second before joining the area of the modern coastal road. Finally, a fourth ancient road, also parallel to the shoreline, appears in the flat zone northwest of the present coastal road.

==== The Forum area ====
This zone brings together several monumental buildings: a basilica running along the southeastern side of the square, a sanctuary to the northwest built according to the model of the *templum cum porticibus*, a monumental temple to the southwest identified by its massive foundations, and a bath complex located further south. To this ensemble were added a large building organised around a central courtyard, as well as streets and various secondary structures.

==== The coastal zone ====
This area appears as a densely built sector dominated by economic, hydraulic, and cultic structures. Between the macellum and the theatre, survey work revealed several large storage buildings linked to the macellum, a sanctuary facing the sea, a vast complex of cisterns accompanied by small storerooms, as well as buildings with internal grid structures associated with economic activities. Further northeast, a monumental complex composed of numerous small rooms and marked by the presence of kilns indicates an artisanal or production zone. Overall, the area forms a coastal front structured by major specialised infrastructures.

==== The “residential” zone ====
This inland area, set back from the coastline, appears to be predominantly residential. Excavations have revealed several houses and a small bath complex, forming a dense domestic quarter between the Forum and the theatre, structured by irregular streets and internal courtyards. However, it also includes public buildings, including a sanctuary west of the theatre. Further northeast, a large open area framed by two major axes may correspond to a second public square. The whole forms a heterogeneous urban space where housing, public facilities, and a complex street network coexist.

==== The industrial zone ====
This area displays a distinctly industrial character. An ancient road parallel to the coastline structures the space, accompanied by crossroads leading inland. Around this road, magnetic surveys reveal workshops making intensive use of fire, organised in small groups within enclosed spaces. Further northwest, large sectors without visible buildings but saturated with irregular anomalies likely correspond to extensive refuse dumps. The whole suggests a heavy artisanal district, possibly linked to purple‑dye production. At the centre of this zone, a large open space is crossed by an aqueduct whose course leads toward the coastal cistern complex.

=== The forum ===
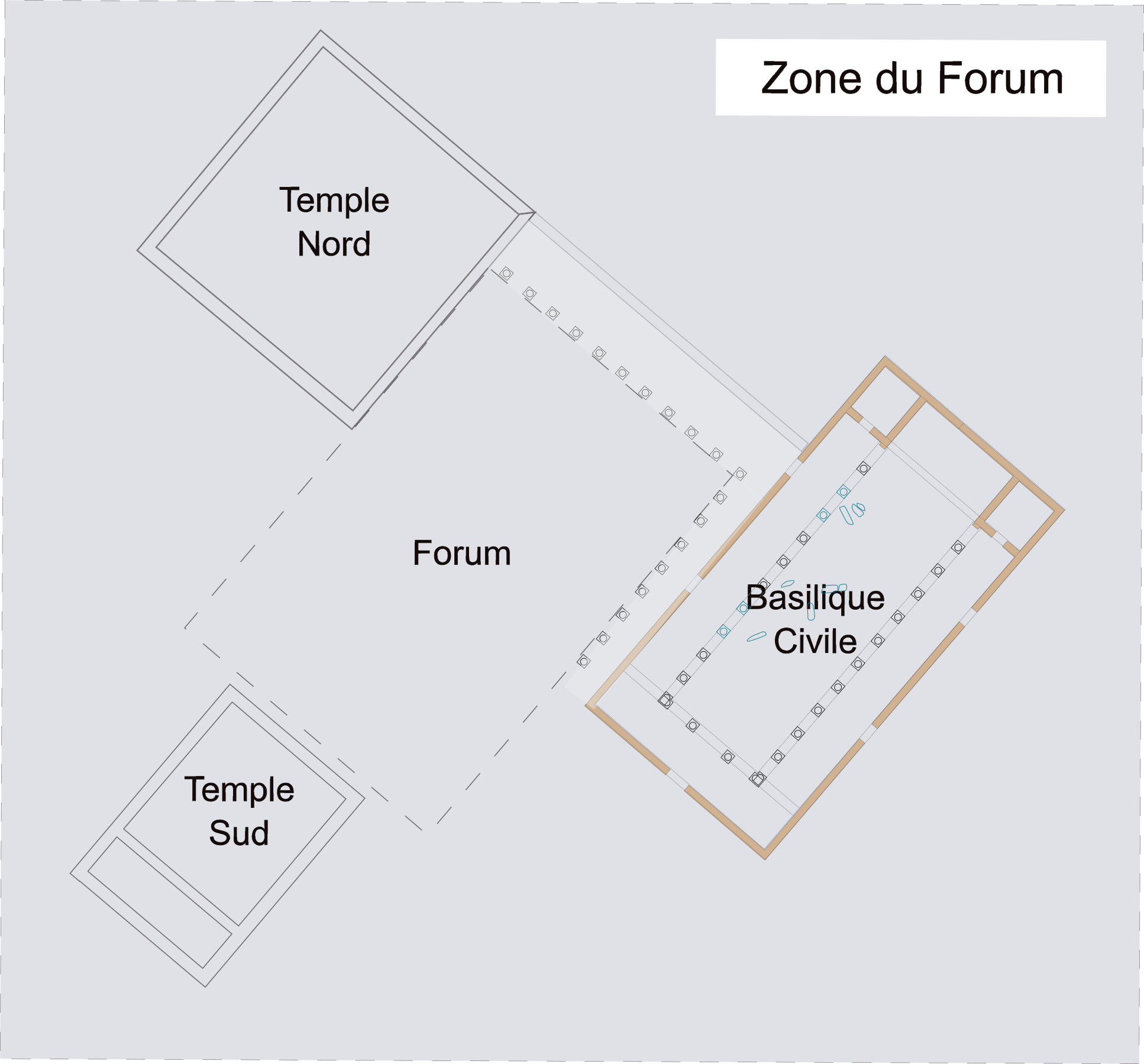
The forum

The forum of Meninx appears as a rectangular square oriented southwest–northeast, measuring approximately 36 m in width and 55 m in length. This relatively small space formed an urban core surrounded by public buildings such as the basilica, the two temples (north and south), and two porticoes.

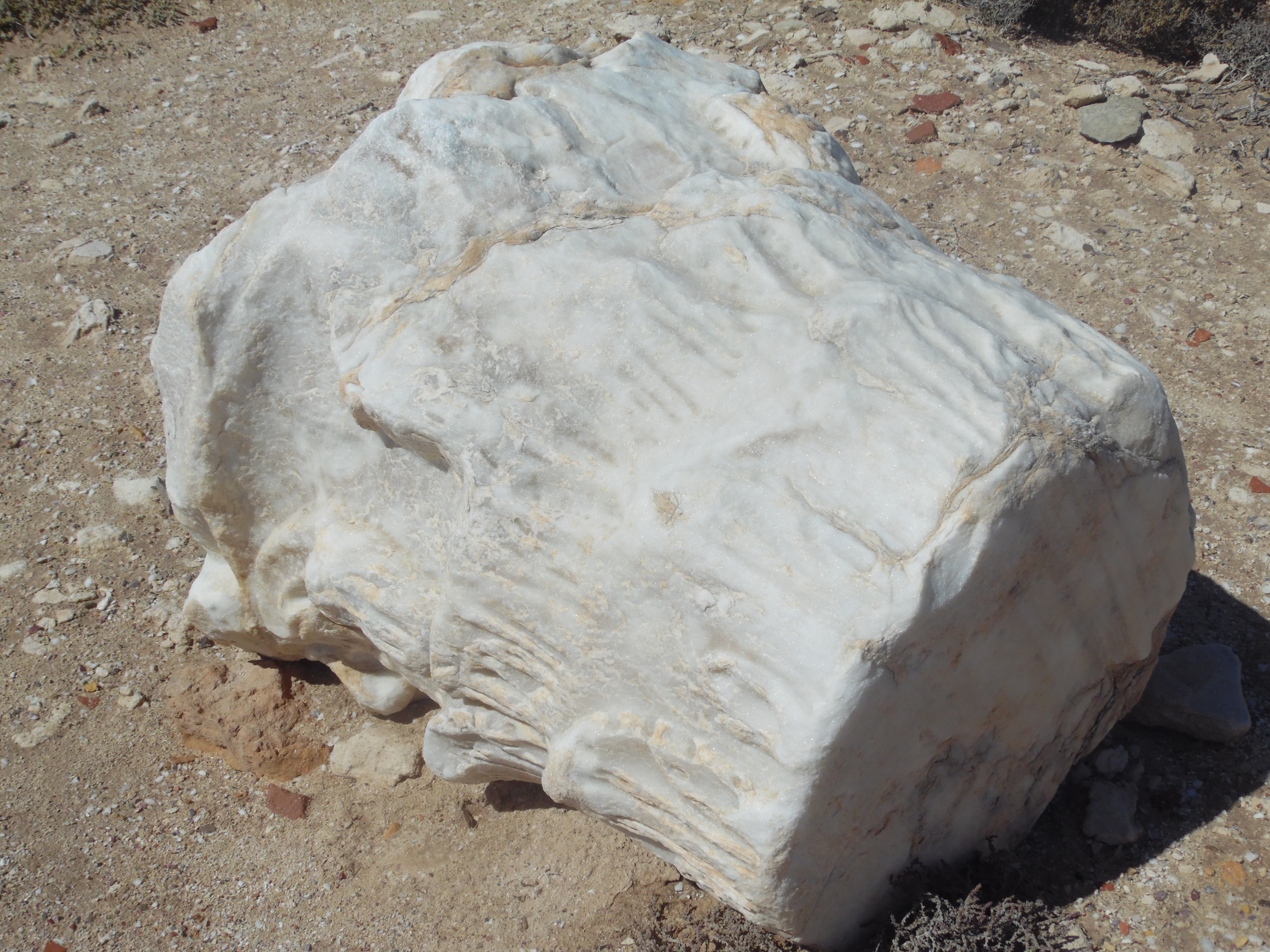
A Corinthian capital from the forum

The forum was bordered by porticoes on only two sides, with a marked difference in their depth. The northeast portico, built in the Augustan period, reached a depth of 6.20 m and later received paving and marble revetment. It extended from the northern temple to the basilica, where it joined a more recent and narrower portico, no more than 3.80 m deep, thus creating an asymmetrical frame for the square.

The square was repaved during these works, and several limestone slabs as well as remains of the preparatory layer are still preserved. The floors of the northeast portico and the esplanade of the northern temple were slightly higher than the level of the forum, accessible by a few steps, revealing a hierarchical organisation of space.

The evolution of the forum’s layout was influenced by its early construction, particularly after the erection of the northern temple in the Augustan period, which limited the addition of columns on the northwest side. During its reorganisation in the 2nd century AD, architects had to adapt to this earlier plan: the forum thus retained an irregular yet harmonious shape, integrating new marble‑clad buildings.

Around thirty marble fragments were discovered around the forum, including a head of Emperor Antoninus Pius dating to the mid‑2nd century, probably from an imperial statue. Fragments of a colossal statue of the god Serapis were also found — the earliest evidence of his cult at Meninx.

=== The market ===
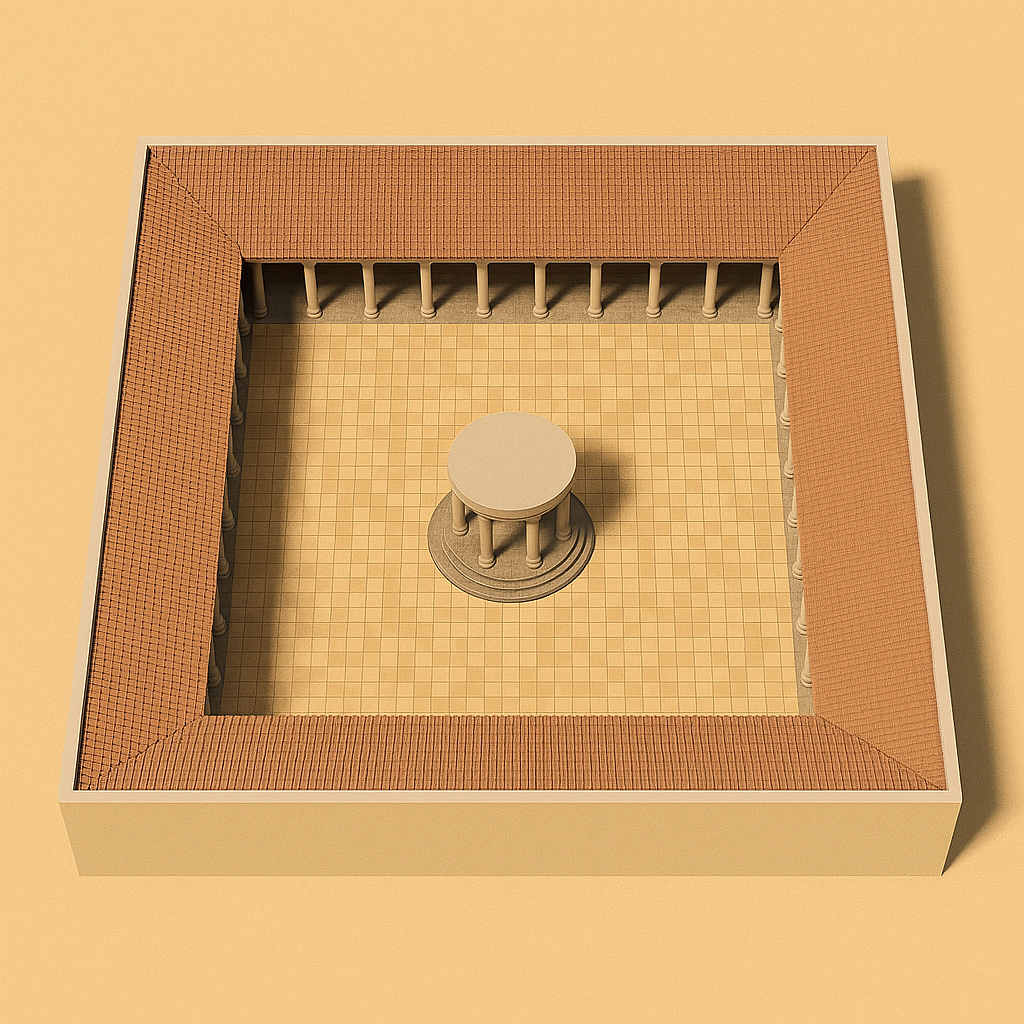
The market

The market of Meninx lies about 60 metres south of the public square and is today partially submerged below the current sea level. The building extends along a street oriented southwest–northeast, one of the city’s main circulation axes. Built between the late 1st century and the early 2nd century AD, this large covered market reflects the phase of urban prosperity experienced by Meninx during the imperial period.

The market displays the typical architectural features of Roman macella: a paved rectangular courtyard with a circular stone platform at its centre — probably the remains of a *tholos* or rotunda with ritual or commercial functions — surrounded by columned porticoes opening onto a series of shops intended for the sale of foodstuffs.

Thanks to its exceptional dimensions (approximately 60 × 60 metres), its square and harmonious plan, and its proximity to the coastline and harbour installations, this macellum stands out clearly from the roughly twenty markets known in Roman Africa. It constitutes a remarkable testimony to the importance of maritime trade in the city’s economy.

=== The warehouses ===
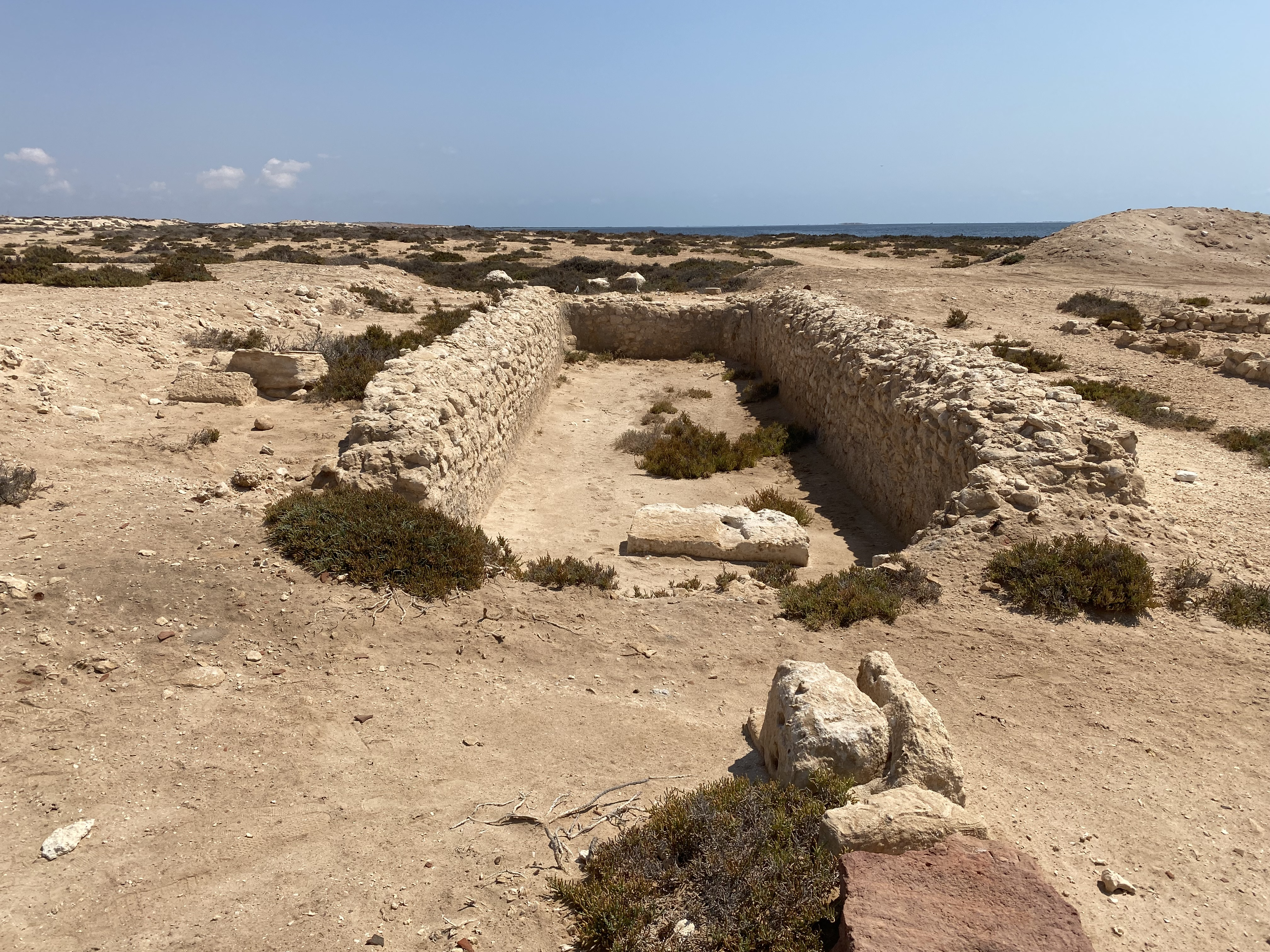
Remains of the warehouses

This complex is located about 300 m south of the forum, directly on the shoreline, and covers an area exceeding 2,800 m². It consists of two rows of rooms on either side of a wide porticoed street, as well as basins, cisterns, and platforms paved with large stone slabs.

The central street measures 65 m in length and 5.25 m in width, paved with pink and grey limestone slabs, and bordered by two covered porticoes: the southeast portico, 1.85 m wide, and the northwest portico, 2.40 m wide.

The southeast side includes eight rooms and a cistern opening onto the sea, while the north side contains two rooms and a basin. In the northwest sector, six additional rooms and another cistern were uncovered. Excavations also revealed fifteen tombs, indicating a later funerary reuse of the site.

Soundings show that the complex was used for about four centuries as warehouses for storing fish products — salted goods, *garum*, purple dye — originating from workshops located about 800 m to the west. Wine and dye‑related materials were also stored there, while the rooms in the northwest sector appear to have served as a small market for everyday goods.

From the 4th century AD onward, the complex was transformed into an industrial area for fish processing: some rooms were used for the preparation of *garum*, others as water cisterns, while certain basins were probably intended for purple‑dye production. In its final phases of occupation, the site was partially reused for funerary purposes, as indicated by the discovered burials.

=== The Forum Basilica ===
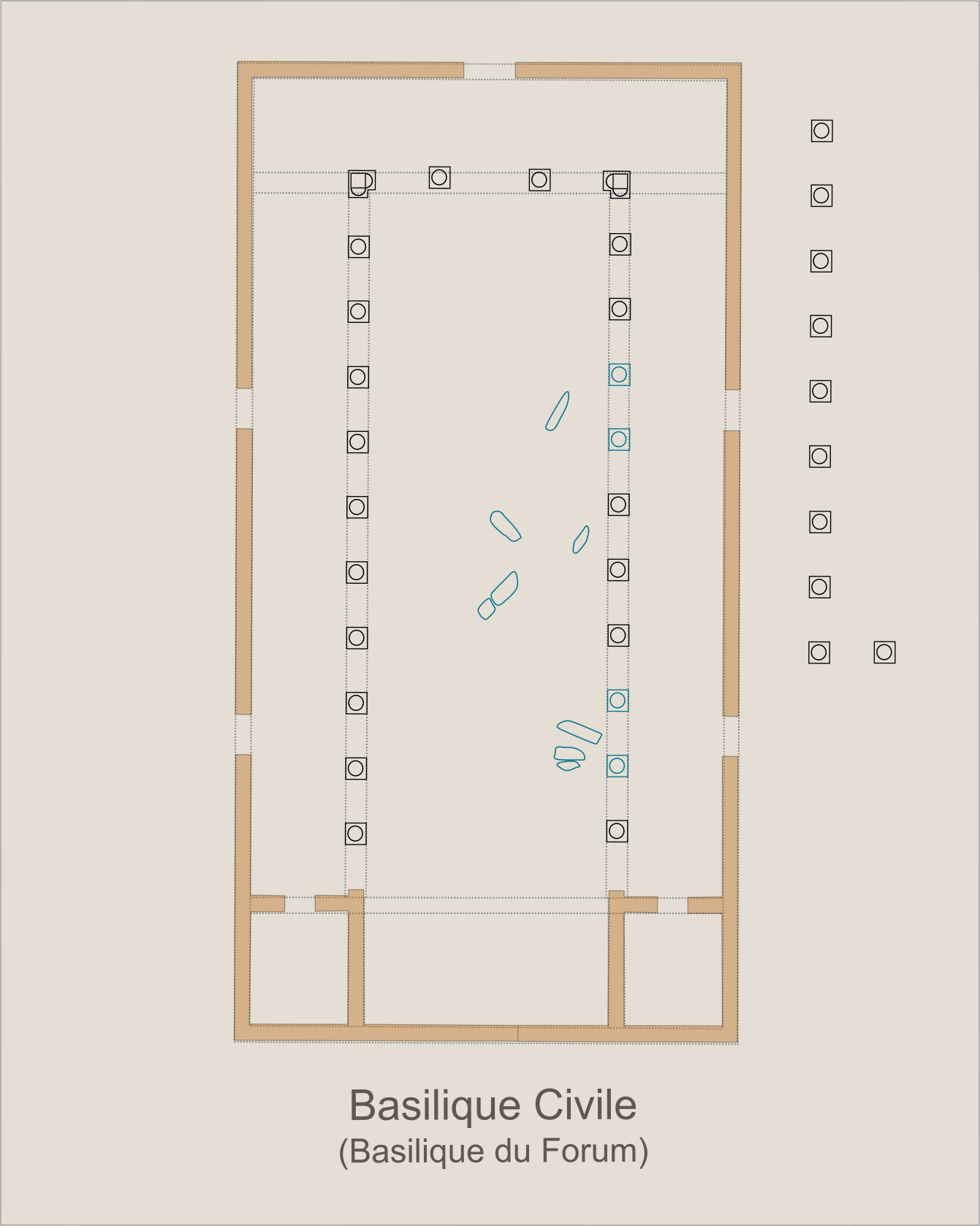
Plan of the civil basilica

The building follows a rectangular plan of approximately 48 × 24.70 metres, oriented along a northeast–southwest axis. It consisted of two storeys, and its large interior hall was divided into three naves by rows of columns: eleven columns along the long sides and four columns along the shorter southwest side. (Note: p. 121)

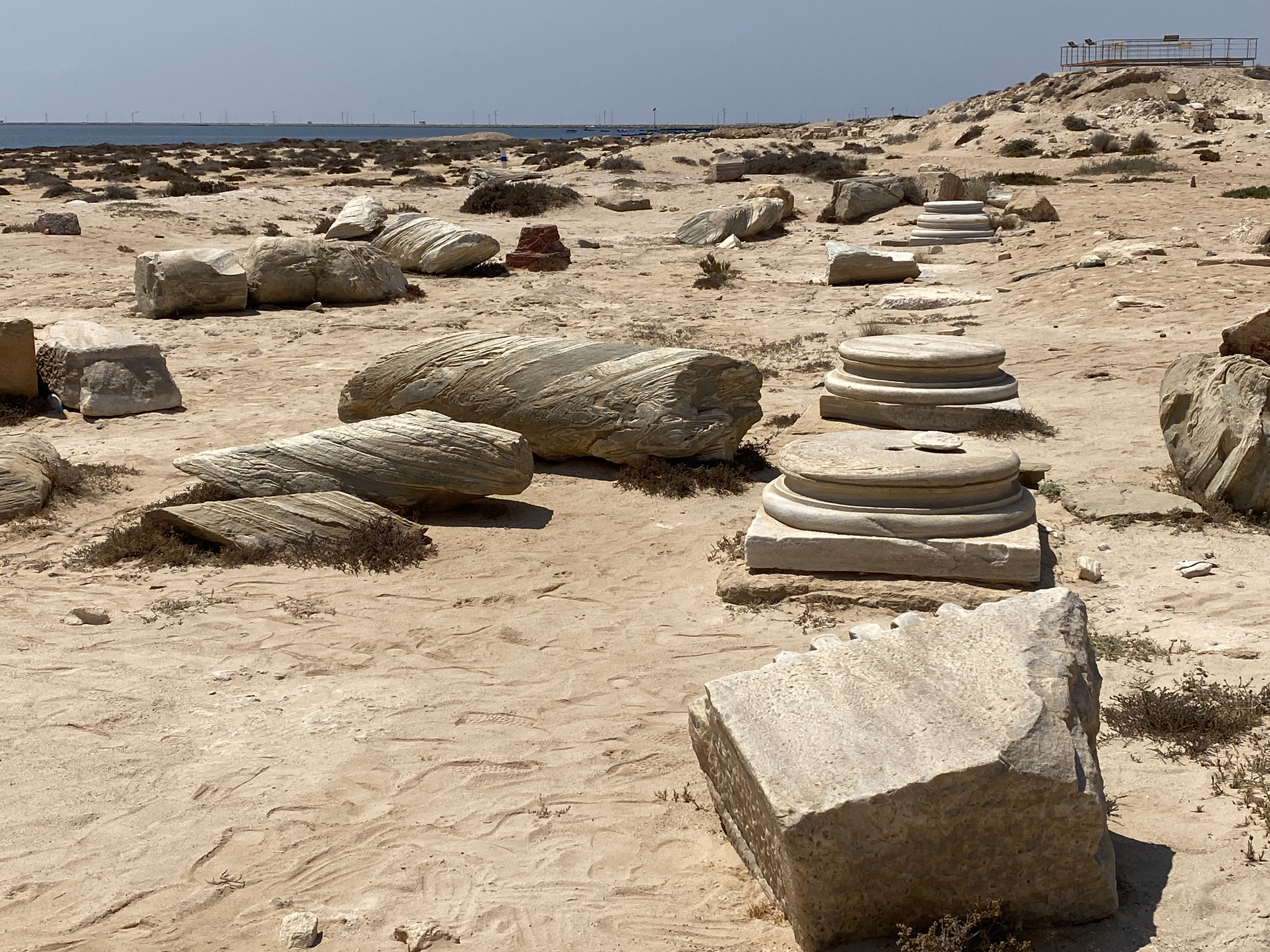
Remains of the basilica

On the northeast side, a rectangular exedra of about 12 × 6.50 m opened onto the central nave. It stood out from the nave through its elevated floor level, the variation in paving, and possibly the use of different materials. Foundations aligned with the northwest colonnade may indicate the presence of two rooms, each about 5.70 × 4.80 m, positioned along the aisles and flanking the exedra. To the northeast, the colonnade likely joined the walls in the form of pilasters.

Forty‑six architectural elements have been identified in the building, including Attic–Ionic bases in Proconnesian marble and monolithic columns in cipollino marble. The height of the ground floor is estimated between 8.5 and 8.8 metres, while the upper storey — composed of smaller columns and gypsum blocks — reached about 6 metres. Paired heart‑shaped columns occupied the southern corners of the building. The architectural ensemble was completed by a richly decorated entablature, including a dentil frieze, an astragal, and an upward‑curving cyma. The building was likely covered by a double‑pitched roof with Italian tiles. The use of imported marbles testifies to the prosperity of the city and its active integration into the economic networks of the Empire. (Note: p. 122)

According to several sources, the building was a civil basilica, probably serving judicial or administrative functions within the urban centre. ·

=== The two Christian basilicas ===
==== The eastern basilica ====
This building was first described in 1882 by Dr. Marie Henri Charles Hussenet, who noted that it was fully paved and surrounded by projecting tombs. Excavations revealed an inscription linked to a burial located beneath the first bay on the right side. This tomb was built of carefully cut stone slabs, one of which — shaped as a truncated square‑based pyramid and decorated with a Latin cross — formed part of its cover.

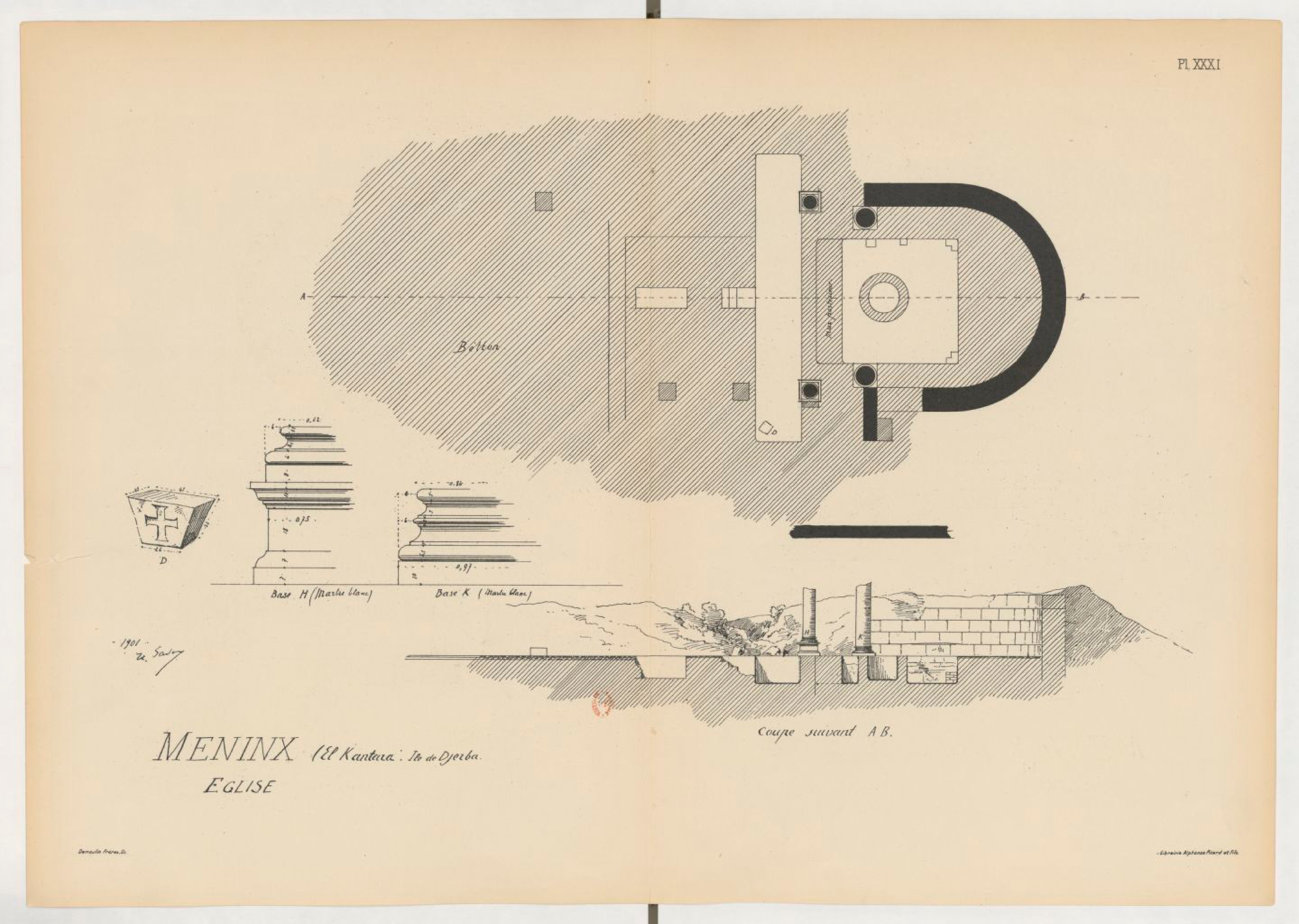
Plan of the eastern basilica

The building stands on the seafront of the site and, according to Paul Gauckler’s plan, is organised around a main nave composed of two rows of white‑marble columns ending in an apse. Inside the apse, a square cavity cut into the floor, containing a circular element at its centre, indicates the presence of a fixed liturgical installation occupying the focal point of the sanctuary.

==== The western basilica (Henchir Bou Merdès) ====
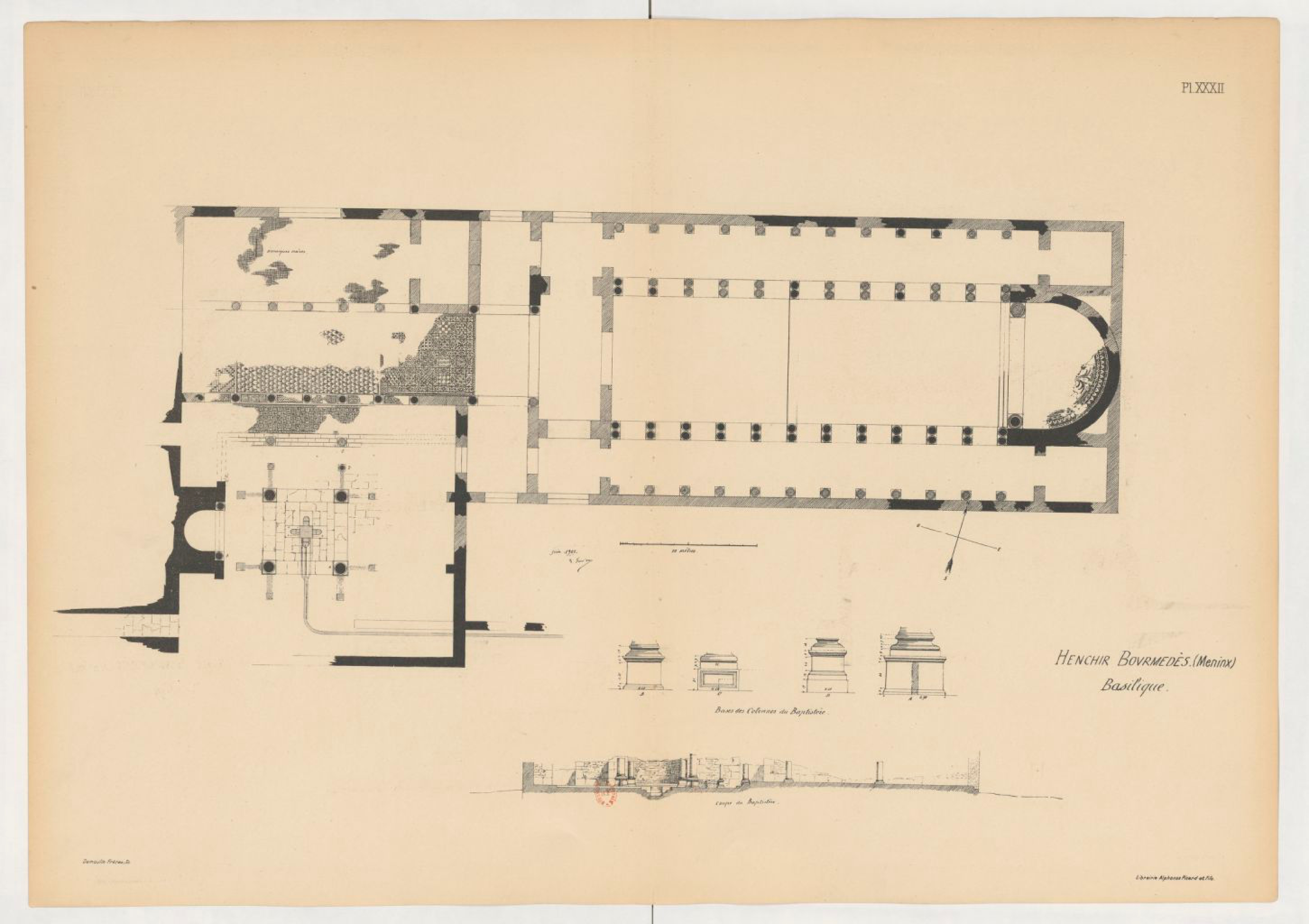
Plan of the western basilica

The basilica is located in the southwestern part of the Henchir Bou Merdès site, on the road between El Kantara and Guellala, and fully belongs to the African basilical type, with architectural features characteristic of North Africa. It was excavated in several campaigns: first by J. Reinach in 1887, then by Eugène Sadoux in 1900 and 1901, before being taken up again by Paul Gauckler in 1906. The plan of the building was published in 1913 despite the absence of a complete publication of the excavation results.

The large basilica is organised into three naves and features an apse flanked by two sacristies, partially uncovered by M. Sadoux during the 1901 excavations carried out by the Direction des Antiquités. The floor of the apse displays a semicircular decoration framed by a triple border composed successively of wavy festoons, ovoli, and dentils. The central field is adorned with acanthus scrolls and palm motifs. The ensemble is now mutilated. The mosaics covering the main nave and the two aisles — probably decorated with various geometric patterns — are destroyed. They were still visible during Gauckler’s visit in 1901.

The baptismal font of El‑Kantara, carved from high‑quality white marble, occupies the centre of a rectangular chapel with an apse. Around it extends a polychrome marble pavement, of which several fragments survive. This first circle of precious materials is itself surrounded by a set of particularly elaborate geometric mosaics, composed of richly decorated tiles alternating with circular medallions and quatrefoil motifs. The entire area to the right of the apse has disappeared, but the general organisation of the decoration remains legible and reveals a carefully structured iconographic programme.

To the left of the apse, aligned with the neighbouring basilica, opens a second chapel entirely paved with varied mosaics. It is separated from the baptismal hall by a colonnade, each intercolumniation containing a rectangular panel with a distinct motif: imitations of alabaster pavements, chequerboard tiles, heart‑shaped ivy leaves, or now‑lost compositions. A symmetrical colonnade on the other side of the nave isolates it from an aisle covered with a uniform black mosaic, creating a deliberate contrast with the decorative richness of the central spaces. The nave of the baptistery displays a succession of highly diverse geometric motifs: alternating rectangles and squares each decorated differently, zones of overlapping scales, transverse bands imitating alabaster, and finally a chequerboard pavement. Dated to Late Antiquity and associated with the time of Constantine, the ensemble was still visible during observations made in 1901. ·

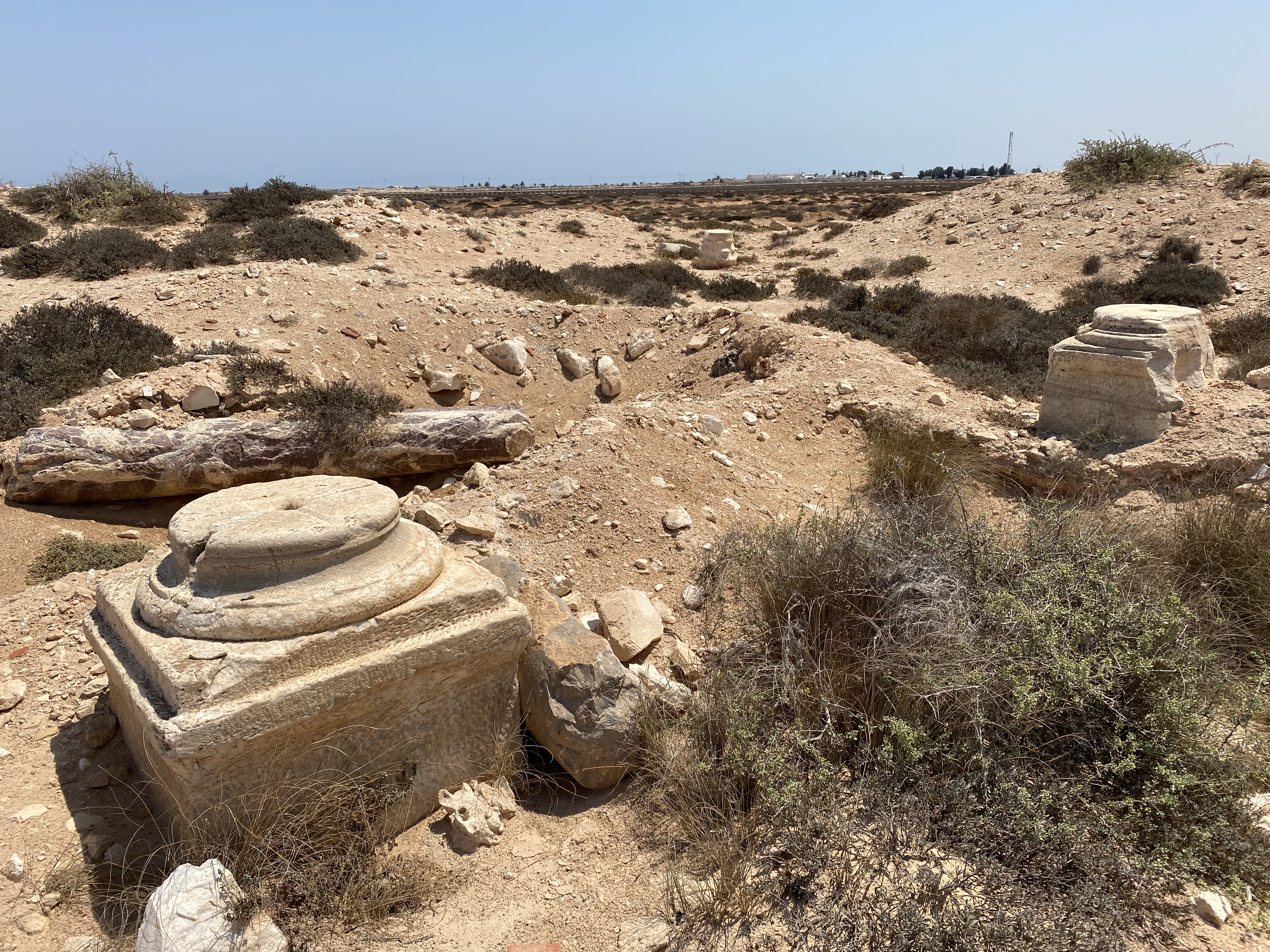
Remains of the western basilica

The baptistery is an almost square room connected to the north to a portico leading to the basilica. It features a semicircular niche to the east, and in front of it four large columns that once surrounded the baptismal font.

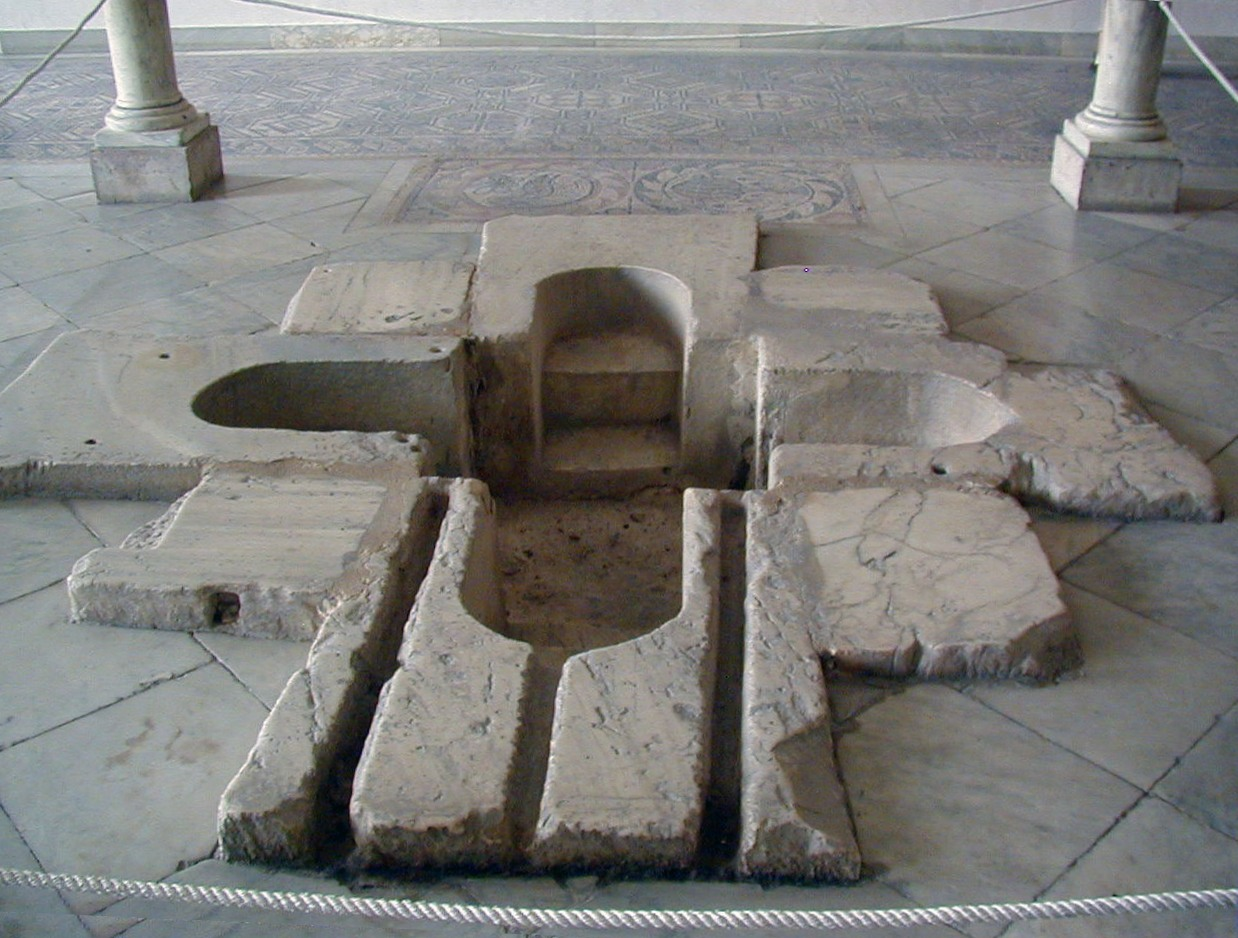
The baptismal font

The baptismal font, transferred to the Bardo Museum, is composed of eight marble blocks: four cross‑shaped and four placed at the corners. The blocks are large, and it is likely that the font originally stood at floor level or slightly elevated by a step, as in its museum reconstruction. The four large blocks contain an internal staircase of three steps, while the other blocks form a cross with equal arms. This arrangement seems to highlight the external cross shape — a configuration the author notes for the first time in Africa, although ancient prescriptions concerned the interior form of the font rather than its exterior appearance. In this example, the interior space adopts an unusual square shape.

=== The temples ===
==== The northern temple ====
The sanctuary measures approximately 30 × 25 metres and consists of an enclosed courtyard backed by a small temple set against its rear wall. This layout reflects the widely attested North African model of the *templum cum porticibus*, a type of temple composed of a courtyard surrounded by porticoes and an inner sanctuary.

The temple was built in the Augustan period, and underwent a complete refurbishment during the 2nd century AD as part of an expensive renovation programme. Numerous architectural fragments testify to this new decorative scheme, including revetment plaques in various marbles.

Excavations also uncovered the paving of the forecourt and showed that the sanctuary was directly connected to the forum by a staircase of two or three steps, confirming its functional and architectural integration into the heart of the city’s public space.

==== The southern temple ====
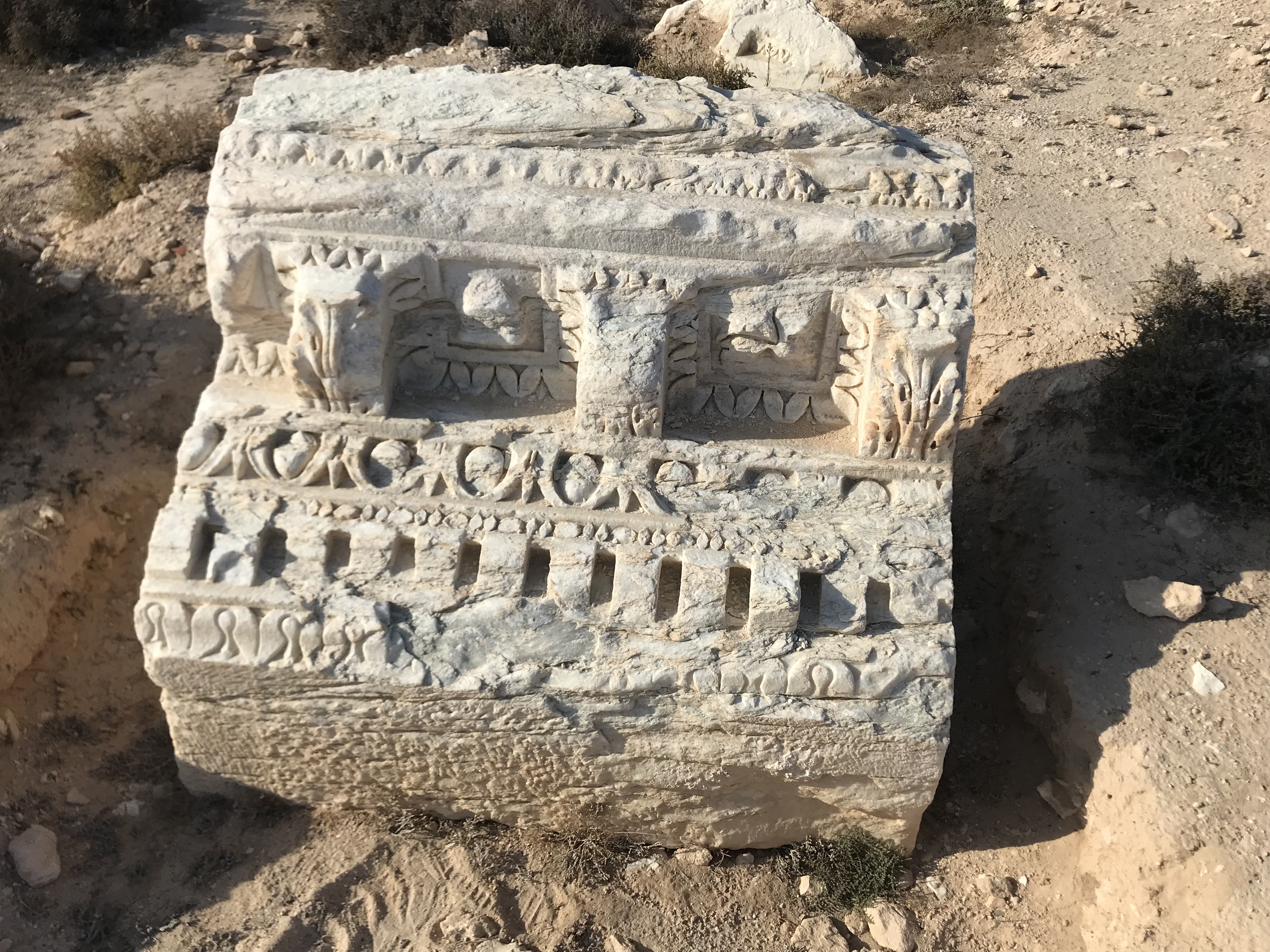
Frieze from the southern temple

A large marble temple stood at the southwestern end of the forum. Its existence is confirmed by two massive walls built of large blocks, erected above the heavily eroded remains of an earlier structure — probably also a temple. The thickest wall (1.30 m) is oriented southwest–northeast toward the forum and meets at a right angle a narrower wall to the southeast. Numerous marble architectural fragments scattered across the forum likely belonged to this monument.

The most convincing group consists of thirteen elements — capitals, bases, and enormous geison blocks — richly decorated and carved in Pentelic marble. These are the largest marble blocks discovered on the site. Their excellent state of preservation allows for a proposed reconstruction of the temple façade, whose height is estimated at around 17 metres.

The style of these elements dates to the mid‑2nd century AD, and their provenance, size, and consistent dating reinforce their attribution to the powerful foundations visible in the southwestern area of the forum.

==== The temple of Isis ====
This sanctuary is distinguished by a quadrangular plan of approximately 40 × 40 metres, oriented toward the sea. Access likely occurred via the major road running along this side. Geophysical survey results clearly reveal a courtyard surrounded by porticoes, a temple set against the rear wall, and a central structure interpreted as an altar. (Note: p. 142)

Like the northern temple, this sanctuary belongs to the *templum cum porticibus* type — that is, a temple with a courtyard enclosed by a portico. Inside the temple, a fragmentary marble sculpture — probably part of a frieze — provides explicit evidence of the deity worshipped here: it depicts *uraeus* serpents bearing a solar disk framed by cow horns, a set of symbols characteristic of the cult of Isis. (Note: p. 148)

=== The baths ===
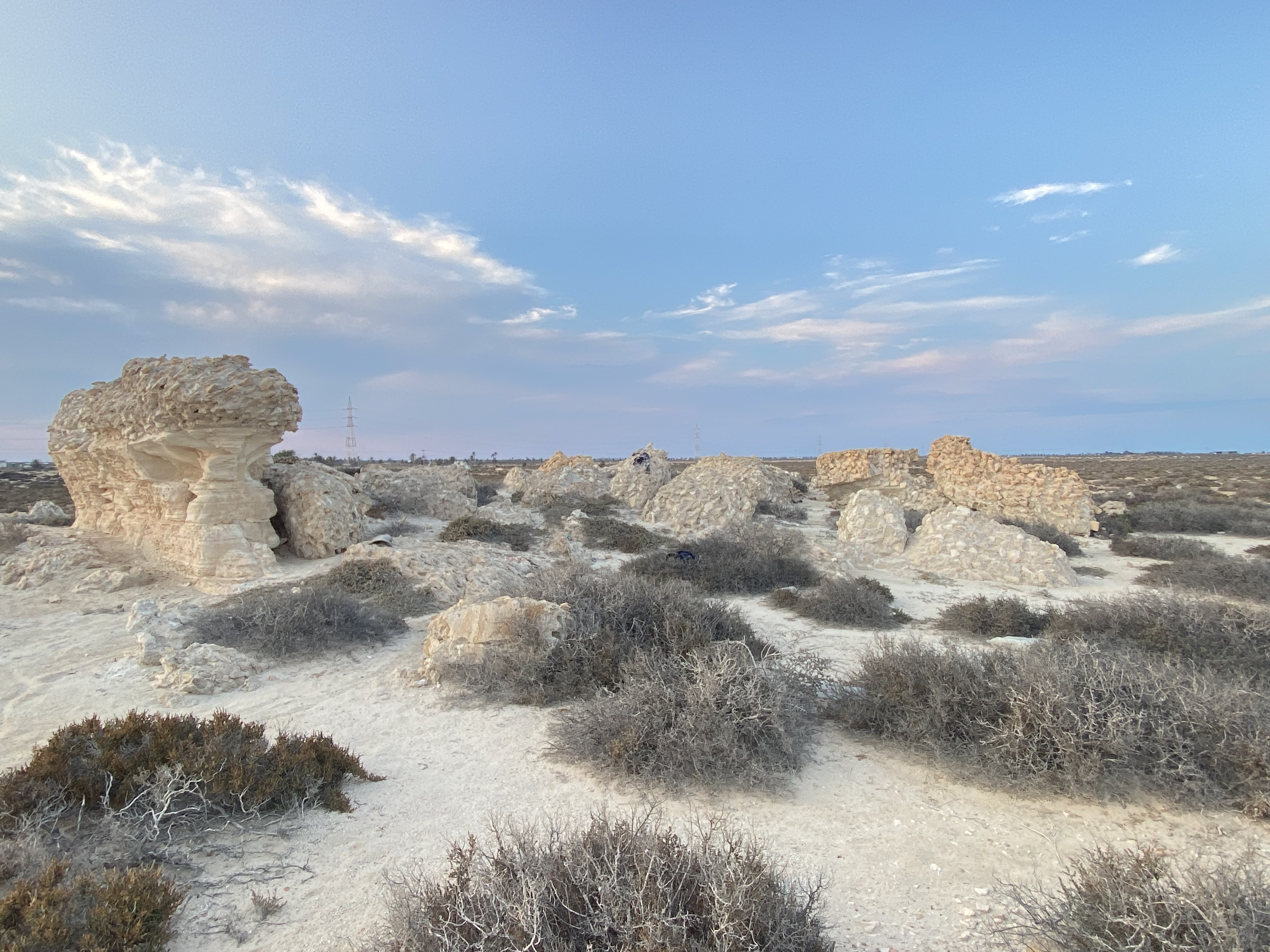
The large baths

Excavations reveal the existence of two bath complexes within the city: the large baths to the north of the urban centre, visible today above ground through collapsed vaulted ceilings, bathing pools, and cisterns, · very likely built in the 3rd century AD, and a second complex located near the forum. The latter is characterised by a long central corridor flanked by small square rooms, some of which are decorated with mosaics.

Two unheated pools — one rectangular and the other semicircular — indicate the presence of a *frigidarium*, to which three additional rooms were attached, including a *caldarium* equipped with hypocaust systems and heating ducts built into the walls. Outside, an elevated reservoir and a large cistern attest to a complete water‑supply system.

This modestly sized complex was most likely a private bath establishment, comparable to those known at Cuicul or Pupput. Its decoration — dated to the early 3rd century — includes a remarkable group of six small statues in Pentelic marble, found headless in the semicircular pool. Among them are a statue of a woman in a peplos holding a jug, a seated statue of Jupiter, and two fountain statues pierced to allow water to flow. These pieces date to the mid‑2nd century AD, originate from various contexts, and appear to have been reused and deliberately deposited in the 4th century, before the final abandonment of the baths in the 5th century.

=== Houses ===
The residential complex of Meninx includes two houses from sectors 2 and 5 discovered during the Tunisian–German project, as well as the houses uncovered by the Tunisian–American mission in the southeastern zone (Meninx I and II).

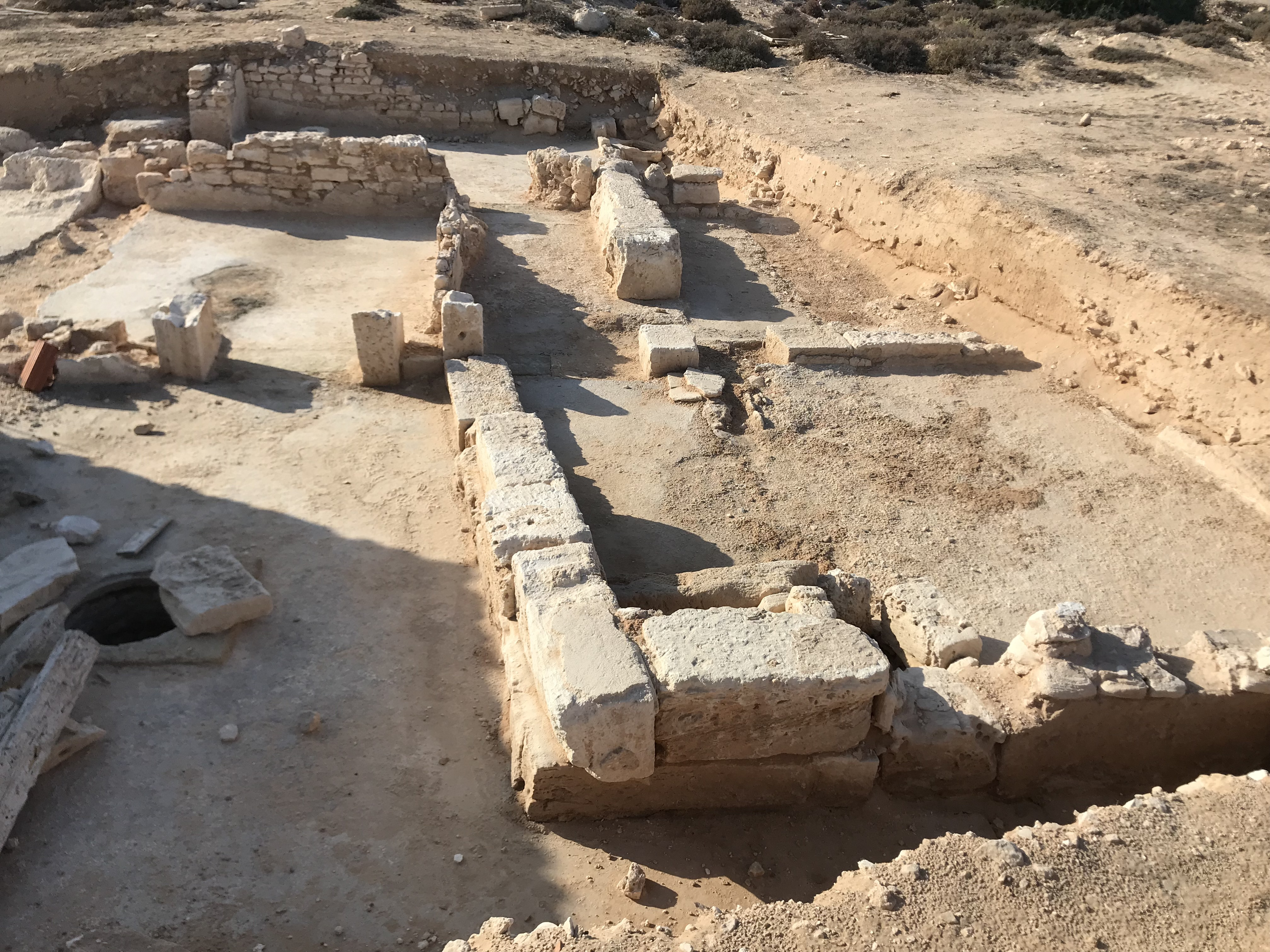
Excavations in House no. 2

==== House in sector no. 2 ====
Excavations reveal a dwelling organised around an almost square courtyard (5.5 × 6–6.5 m), surrounded by narrow rooms and equipped with an *opus signinum* floor and a cistern buried in the northeast corner. · The earliest levels show wooden postholes and a pit for burying amphorae, suggesting a simple dwelling, perhaps a fisherman’s hut.

The upper levels (mid‑3rd–1st century BC) correspond to a Neo‑Punic occupation, the earliest on the site. From the 1st century BC onward, the house adopts a stable architectural form, with stone foundations, a cistern, and mosaic floors. It remained in use until the Byzantine period before being abandoned in the 7th century.

==== House in sector no. 5 ====
Rescue excavations linked to the construction of the information pavilion uncovered a residential complex from the Roman and Late Antique periods, located north of a large courtyard. (Note: p. 105) It consists of small rooms arranged in two rows, some opening onto underground cisterns covered with vaults.

One square room (5 m per side) contains a well connected to a large cistern, while another (3.5 × 4.5 m) has mortar floors and a painted panel. The presence of a basin and a hearth indicates a kitchen function in the final phase. (Note: p. 108) The earliest structures date to the 3rd century, the latest to the 7th century. The complex appears to have formed the residential wing of a larger house, later complemented by Byzantine walls on its eastern side. (Note: p. 111)

==== House Meninx I ====
The building is characterised by an L‑shaped courtyard (10 × 4 m) and two cisterns. These features suggest the possible presence of a purple‑dye workshop (*murex*), an activity well attested at Meninx.

==== House Meninx II ====
The building includes a square courtyard (10 m per side) connected to a 4‑m‑wide room. Excavations uncovered plaster elements, including fragments of a coffered ceiling, wall plaster, and a column shaft with capitals. The building consists of small rooms arranged around a narrow inner courtyard, reflecting a simple and coherent architectural character.

=== Cisterns ===
The site preserves an elaborate network of cisterns, reflecting a sophisticated hydraulic system and the extensive development of water‑storage installations within the urban fabric of Meninx.

==== Northern cisterns ====
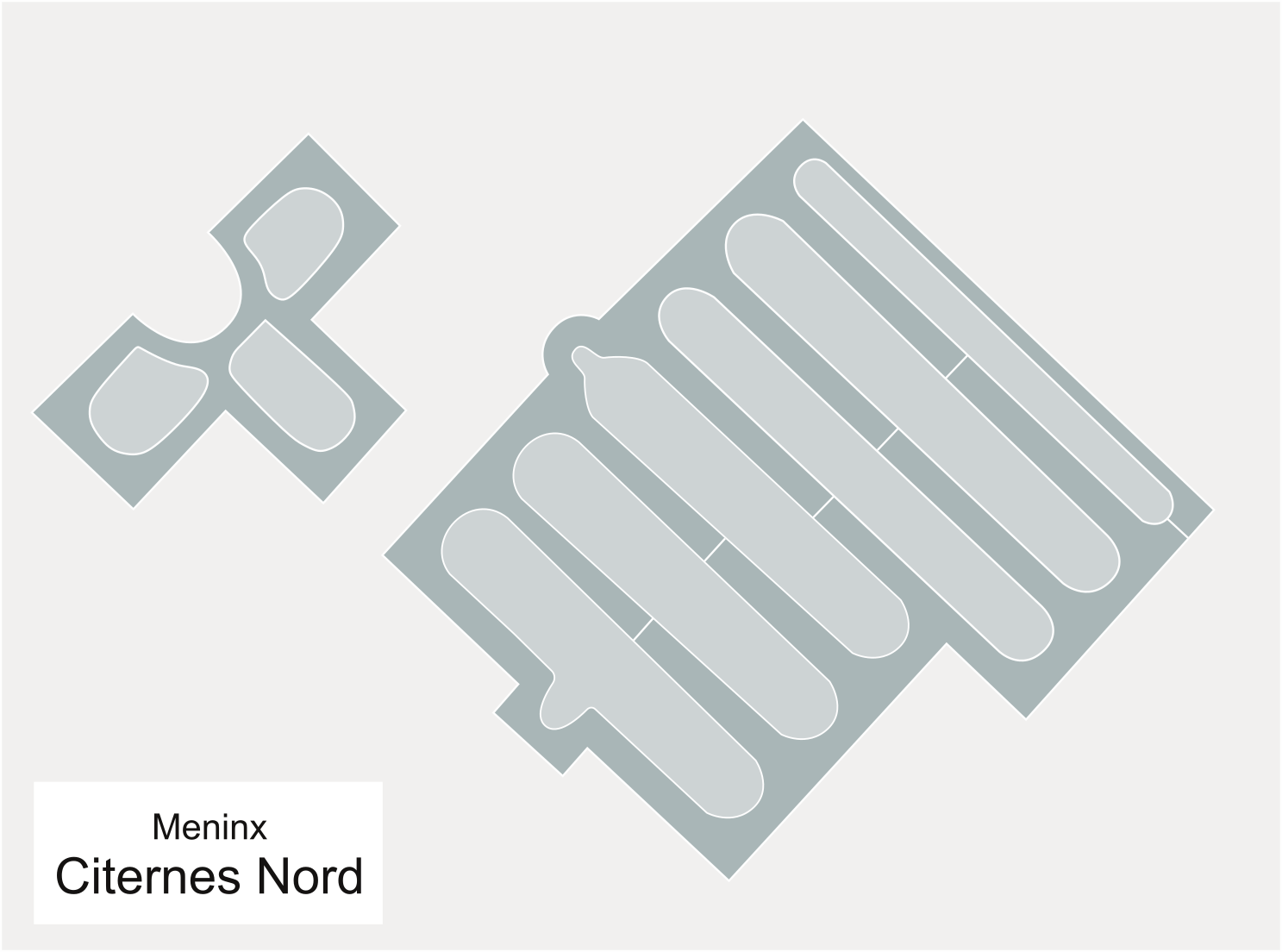
Northern cisterns

About 250 metres northeast of the forum, near the shoreline, lies a vast complex of cisterns covering an area of roughly 500 m². Although heavily degraded, its internal organisation remains legible, allowing a clear understanding of its original structure and its function within the site’s hydraulic network. (Note: p. 191)

The main building, square in plan (approx. 20 × 21 m), consists of six rectangular basins with semicircular ends, separated by thick walls built in *opus insertum*. Two lateral niches and a now‑blocked vaulted opening attest to successive phases of modification.

The basins preserve high‑quality *opus signinum* paving, while the walls display hydraulic mortar reinforced with charcoal and fired‑clay inclusions. Collapsed vaults, especially on the seaward side, reveal that the entire structure was once covered by a vaulted roof.

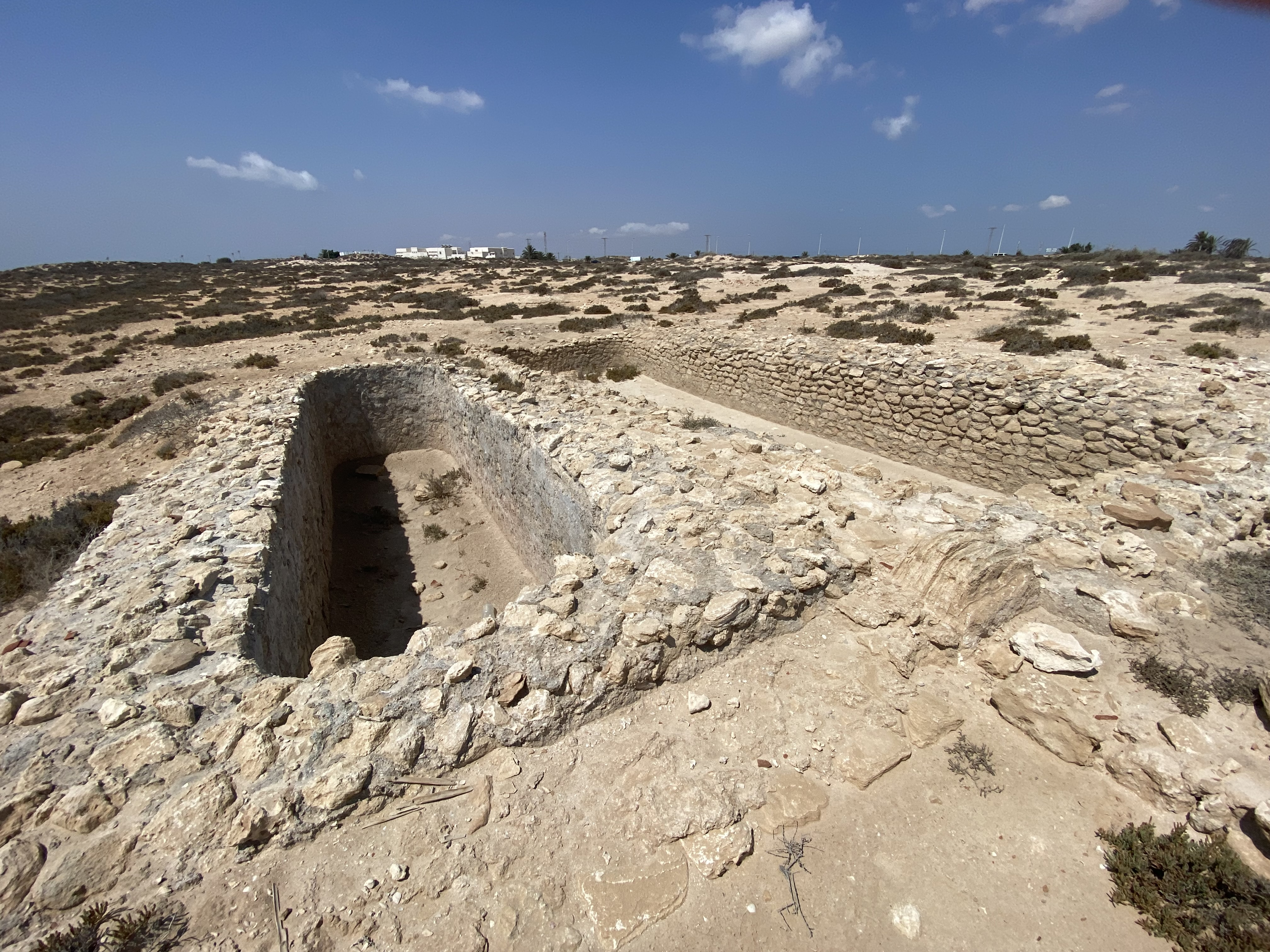
Northern cisterns

The basins are estimated to be about 2.40 metres deep, suggesting a total capacity of around 450 m³ — a major water‑storage function within the site’s hydraulic system. (Note: p. 193)

Nearby lies a second, more eroded installation consisting of three cisterns arranged in a clover‑leaf shape around a semicircular wall, whose function remains uncertain.

In 2018, a channel was uncovered; it appears to connect this complex to the northwestern end of the city, reinforcing the hypothesis of an integrated water‑supply system.

Despite partial destruction, this ensemble offers a remarkable image of Meninx’s hydraulic engineering and raises questions about water circulation, filtration, and management in this coastal sector. (Note: p. 195)

==== Other cisterns ====
In the southwestern sector, several cisterns built in *opus caementicium* are associated with an artisanal complex that may have been used for purple‑dye production or the processing of marine products. Other cisterns, located near the forum, the baths, and residential areas, reveal a functional organisation combining domestic, commercial, and cultic uses. These installations illustrate the hydraulic ingenuity of Meninx and its capacity to adapt to local conditions, demonstrating a refined understanding of water management in a coastal environment requiring advanced technical solutions.

=== Aqueducts ===
The aqueducts of Meninx present a differentiated chronology that allows their development to be outlined. The first two conduits, oriented northwest–southeast, follow a less rectilinear path than the one initially proposed by A. I. Wilson.

Based on ceramic material from a test trench, Wilson dates the construction of the first aqueduct to the 2nd century AD, probably mid‑century. The second aqueduct, wider and built immediately beside the first, is dated to the early 3rd century AD. (Note: p. 201) Visible entry and exit points on the ground confirm the reconstructed course of these two structures.

Aqueduct 3, whose width is comparable to that of aqueduct 2, appears to lead toward the reservoir of the northern baths. Wilson suggests it may be contemporary with these baths and with aqueduct 2, but this remains uncertain due to the absence of material evidence. A fragment of substructure located about thirty metres from the baths is the only tangible trace of its route, preventing any precise dating or clear understanding of its relationship to the organisation of the sector.

Finally, a transverse conduit linking aqueducts 2 and 3 has been identified. Its existence, confirmed by recent geophysical surveys, attests to a complex hydraulic arrangement, although its date also remains unknown.

=== Theatre and amphitheatre ===
The theatre of Meninx has a cavea diameter of about 105 m, making it larger than those of Lepcis Magna 87.60 m and Sabratha 92.60 m, and almost equivalent to that of Carthage (approx. 104 m. The absence of excavations currently prevents precise dating. However, it is likely that its construction formed part of the monumentalisation programme that transformed the coastal sector from the Flavian period onward. (Note: p. 50 – note 293)

The amphitheatre is mentioned only briefly by Golvin, without detailed analysis. As is often the case, it is located on the outskirts of the city. Today, only a few segments of the outer wall survive, from which partition walls of rubble bonded with mortar extend. The arena itself is surrounded by a series of mounds, and its internal space measures approximately 40 × 25 metres.

=== Stadium ===
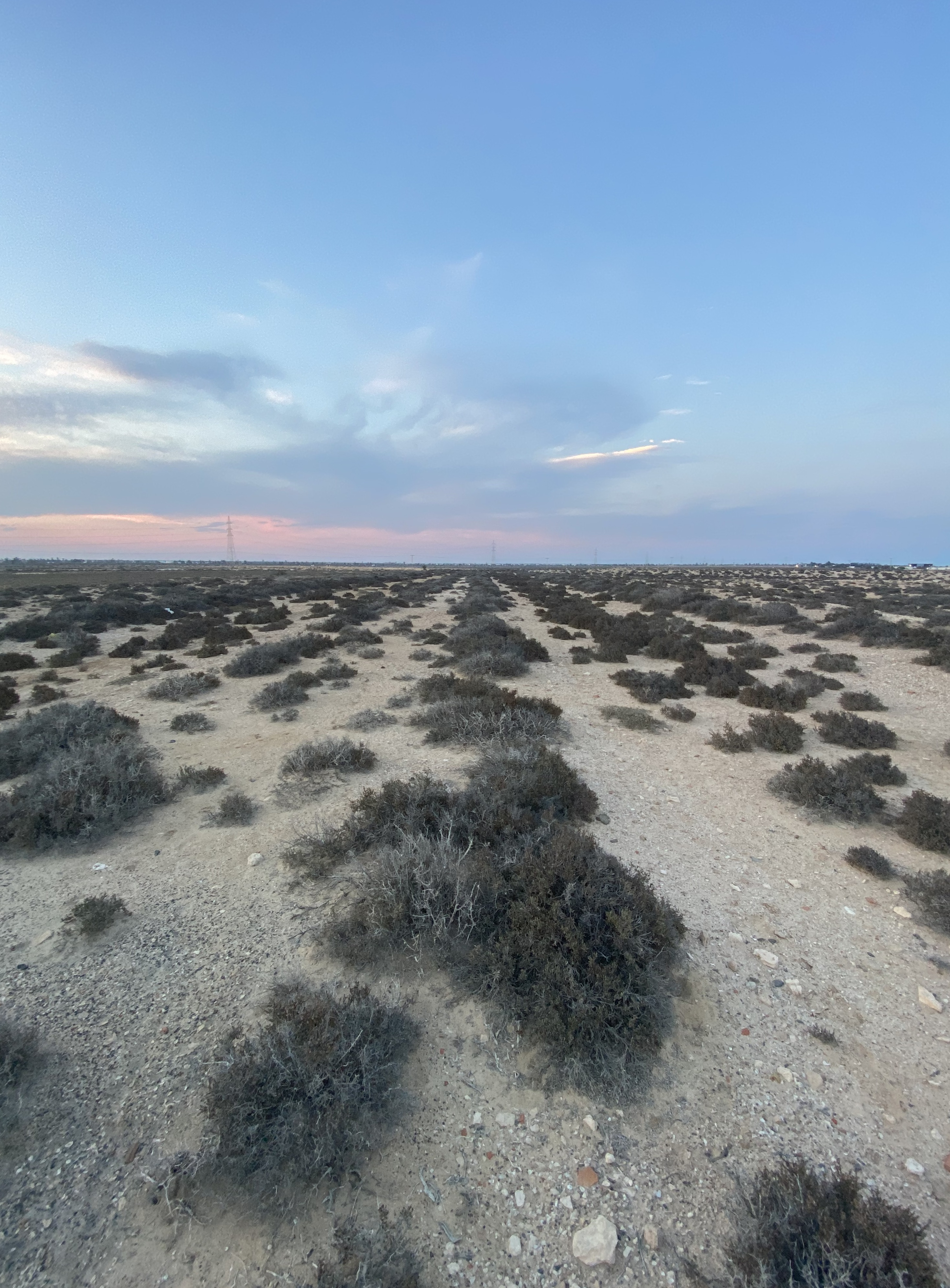
View of the stadium

In the southern part of the city lies a structure whose function remains uncertain. In aerial photographs, it resembles the shape of a circus, but its length — about 150 m — contradicts this interpretation, since the smallest known circus measures at least 240 m. At Meninx, the hypothesis of a circus rests solely on a mosaic depicting a racing scene. It should be recalled that many North African cities did not possess monumental circuses: chariot racing was often organised temporarily using makeshift installations.

=== Ramparts ===
In 1860, Victor Guérin noted the existence of an enclosing wall, of which the foundations could still be traced around the entire site. In 1885, Jean-Marie Brulard made the same observation, noting that unfortunately, little remains standing except for a few parts of the enclosure wall, whose foundations can be traced almost entirely. In 1942, Paul-Marie Duval observed instead that there are no traces of ramparts.

== History of Meninx ==
=== Punic period (c. 350–146 BC) ===
The earliest evidence of an active harbour in southern Djerba comes from the site of Guellala / Haribus, occupied from the late 5th century BC. Research there has revealed the collection of *murex* and the production of purple dye, confirmed by heaps of crushed shells. This site thus constitutes the earliest evidence of harbour activity and purple‑dye production in the region of the Bou Ghrara Gulf.

Meninx appears later in the archaeological record, in the mid‑4th century BC. Its location is explained by particular maritime conditions: the coastline is protected by vast sandbanks, and several deep submarine channels allow seagoing vessels to enter the gulf. One of these channels runs along the coast of Meninx for nearly two kilometres. This natural system, accessible only according to the rhythm of the tides, made navigation safe but likely required local pilots. No artificial harbour was ever needed, and this configuration influenced the elongated shape of the city.

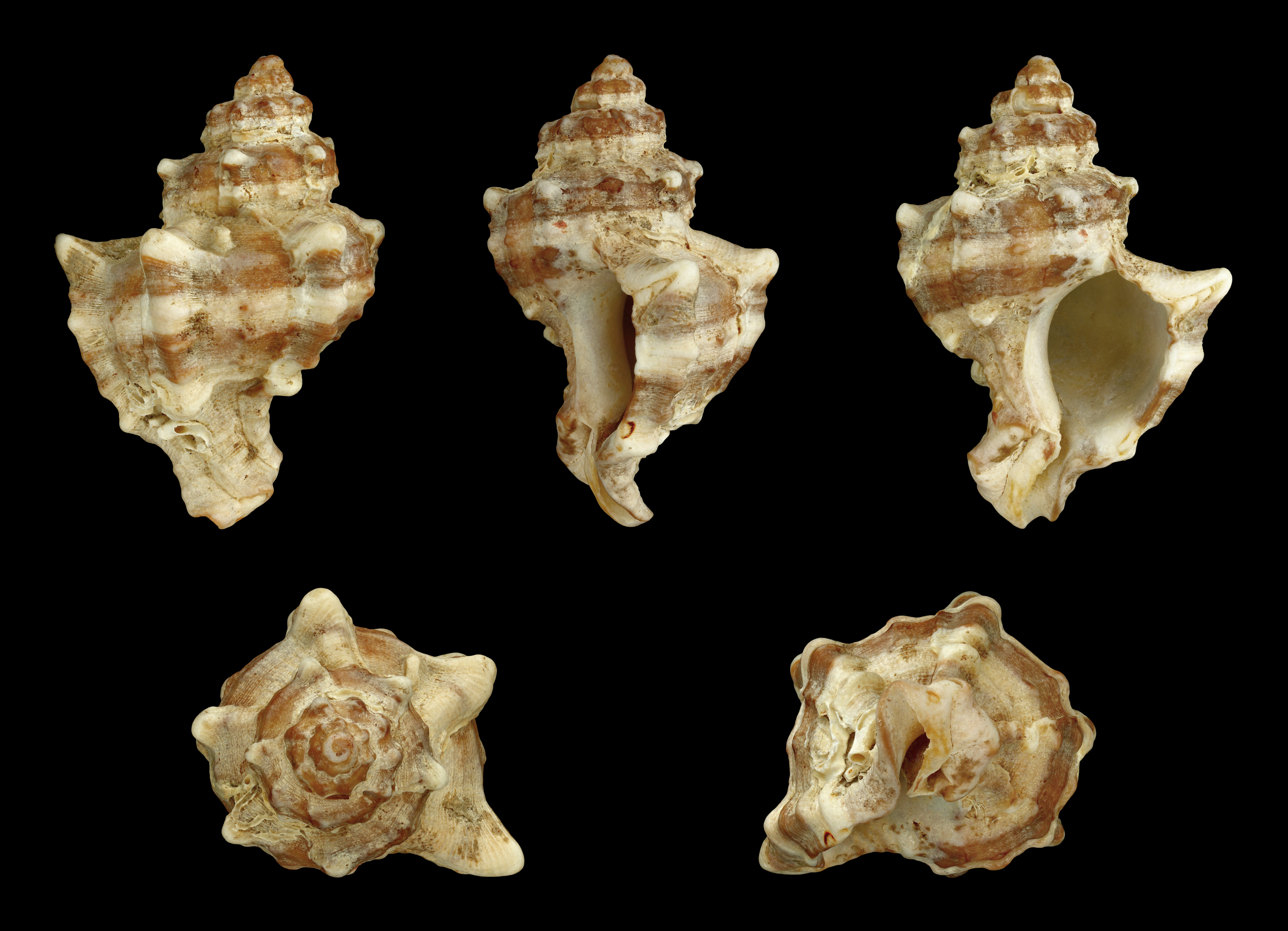
Hexaplex trunculus

The first inhabitants of Meninx may have come from nearby sites on the southeastern coast of Djerba, such as Souk el Guébli or Henchir Tawrirt. Their settlement at Meninx may be linked to the rise of Mediterranean trade under Carthaginian influence. The earliest occupations identified at Meninx are modest: postholes, pits, beaten‑earth floors. In the oldest levels, archaeologists discovered a thick layer of crushed *murex* used as construction material. The *murex* species used (Hexaplex trunculus) does not live in the shallow waters of Meninx; it was therefore collected elsewhere on the island, such as the rocky zones of Guellala. These elements constitute the earliest dated evidence of purple dye at Meninx.

Faunal analyses show a predominance of sheep, mostly males, suited for wool production. This indicates that purple dye was used to colour wool textiles intended for export, requiring extensive pastoralism on the island and likely on the mainland. The absence of spindle whorls suggests that spinning took place outside the city.

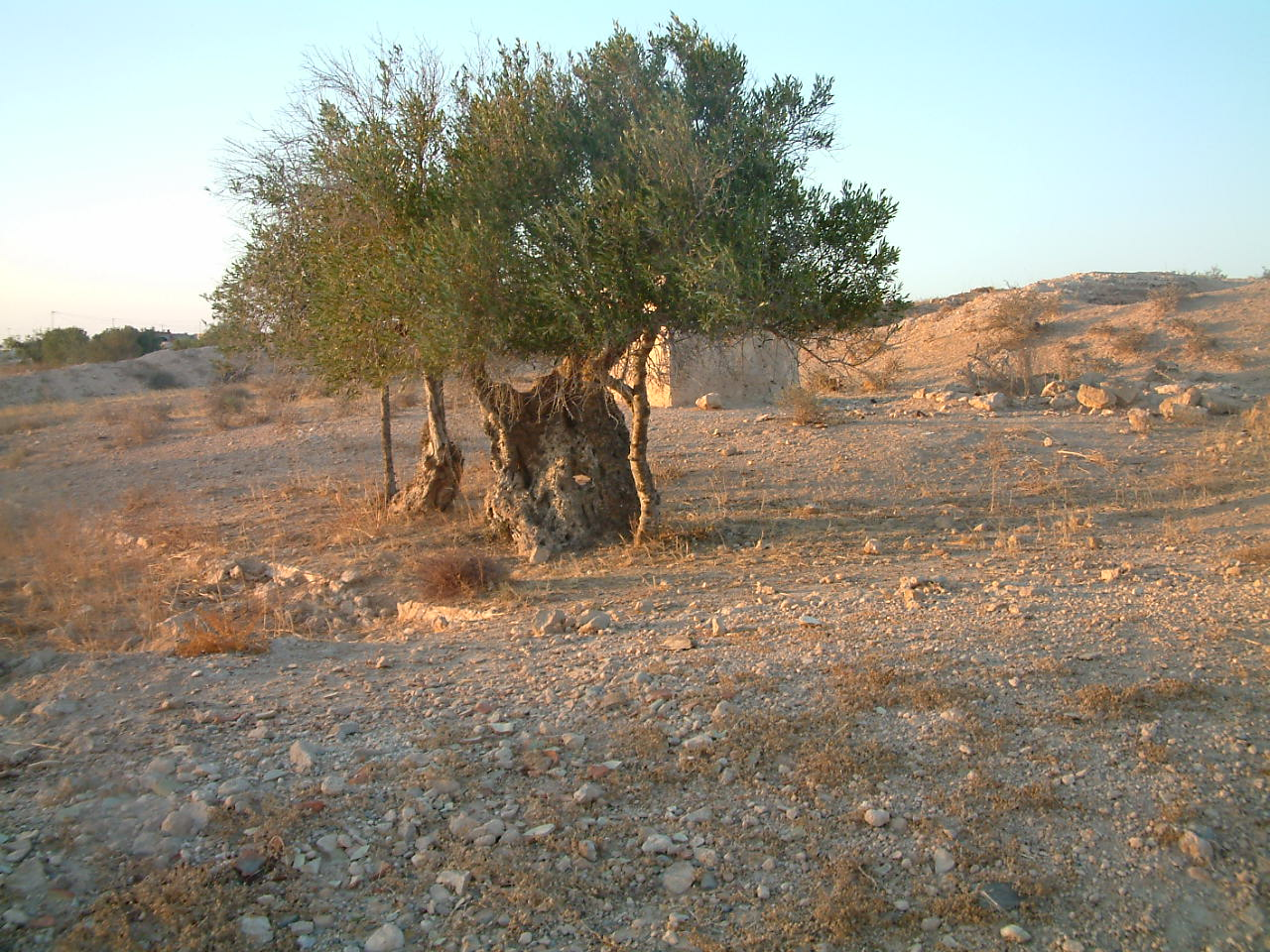
Ancient olive tree in Djerba

Local agriculture was dominated by the olive tree, whose pits are ubiquitous in Punic levels. This constant presence suggests sufficient oil production for the community’s needs, especially since no imported oil amphorae have been identified for this period. Fig trees are also attested by numerous seeds, indicating their role as common fruit crops.

The inhabitants, however, consumed imported wine from Carthage, Sicily and Magna Graecia, as shown by the amphorae found. This consumption was accompanied by imported tableware, notably Attic cups for wine service and cooking ceramics from Byzacena and the Tunisian Sahel used for meal preparation.

Based on objects found in the Punic layers of Meninx, the daily life of a wealthy inhabitant in the 4th century BC can be imagined as that of an individual receiving guests in a house near the shore, drinking wine imported from Magna Graecia in an Attic cup, poured from a Punic oenochoe from Carthage or Byzacena. Meals were prepared in pots and pans imported from the Tunisian Sahel or Carthage, reflecting access to goods from several Mediterranean regions.

=== Late Punic period (146–46 BC) ===
In the second half of the 2nd century and the first half of the 1st century BC, excavations reveal modest houses concentrated around the future forum. One dwelling was organised around a courtyard and equipped with a large underground cistern built of limestone blocks and covered with carefully cut slabs, using a technique known at Carthage. This cistern constitutes the earliest evidence of water supply in the city, as no wells are attested.

A late Punic sanctuary (tophet) has been identified at Henchir Tala, about 2 km north of Meninx. It was likely an extra‑urban sanctuary dedicated to Punic deities, used — based on ceramics — between the late 2nd or early 1st century BC and the 1st century AD. Its functioning corresponds to that of other peripheral tophets in the region, such as those of Zitha and Gigthis. By its elevated, open position on the edge of the city, the Meninx tophet fits fully within this model. In contrast, the necropolis of Meninx remains poorly documented: only a few isolated finds exist, including a Flavian urn containing burnt bones discovered 500 m north of the city.

In the late Punic period, a major change occurred with the appearance of the first locally produced Punic‑type amphorae, made in kilns identified at Souk el Guébli and Henchir Tawrirt. Some, coated with pitch, were used for wine, *garum*, or *salsamenta*, while others probably contained olive oil. The multiplication of workshops reflects agricultural expansion and intensified land exploitation to meet the needs of a growing urban population. The storage of wine in these amphorae suggests a broader diffusion of wine consumption from the late 2nd century BC onward. Local products were mainly intended for storage, while cooking wares continued to be imported, indicating continuity in culinary practices.

Italian wine from the Tyrrhenian and Adriatic coasts reached Meninx, accompanied by tableware from Naples, Etruria and Sicily. These imports confirm the importance of the *Negotiatores Italici* after the fall of Carthage. In contrast, evidence for exports from the island remains very limited.

=== Early Roman period (46 BC – AD 69) ===
At the beginning of this period, Meninx underwent a vast programme of public construction, mainly sanctuaries. The installation of the forum and the construction of monuments around the new urban centre clearly demonstrate the intention to transform the city into a true Roman metropolis after its integration into the Empire.

Meninx experienced a major transformation: the urban centre was monumentalised according to Roman models. An Augustan sanctuary replaced Punic houses, a portico structured the forum, and a temple already occupied its southwestern side. Reused monumental blocks and Italian antefixes indicate the existence of early prestigious temples. The forum adopted a Roman plan as early as the 1st century, before being enriched in the 2nd century with imported marbles. The sculpted pillars with “Oriental” figures, inspired by Rome, show the desire to assert an urban identity fully integrated into the Empire only a few decades after the conquest.

During the Augustan period, several houses in Meninx were remodelled: *opus signinum* floors and mosaics. Peripheral domestic areas remained occupied and were adapted in the 1st century AD. Another house shows an evolution toward a peristyle in the 2nd century.

In the mid‑1st century AD, Meninx undertook the construction of a large extra‑urban sanctuary northeast of the city. Surveys reveal a quadrangular complex with a porticoed courtyard, a podium temple, and a central altar. Excavations show activity from the Augustan period, but the main construction spans from the mid‑1st century to the Flavian period. A cistern was integrated into the entrance portico. A relief depicting *uraei* with a solar disk suggests a cult of Isis.

Dressel 2–4 amphora

Regional workshops diversified and increased their production: fine wares inspired by Campanian models, hybrid forms derived from Punic and Tripolitanian traditions, and cooking wares influenced by Pompeian red‑slip productions. From the mid‑1st century AD onward, Djerba produced Dressel 2/4 amphorae mainly intended to supply Meninx, reflecting significant agricultural surplus. Excavations also reveal a strong presence of glassware (bowls, cups, flasks) dated to the 1st century, as well as indications of local production, although no specific workshop has been identified.

=== Middle Roman period I (AD 69–117) ===
Meninx experienced an intense phase of construction focused on the economic infrastructure of the coastal zone. A monumental *macellum* near the harbour was built along a major axis and accompanied by a vast storage building. To the southwest, the *horrea*, organised around a long courtyard, completed this commercial ensemble, while further north a complex of six parallel cisterns, dated to the late 1st century, attests to major hydraulic investment. Adjacent rooms, perhaps linked to an industrial complex, were also built. Under the Flavians and Trajan, these developments reveal the rapid economic and commercial growth of Meninx.

The exceptional alignment of economic buildings along the sea is linked to the particular harbour configuration of Meninx, dependent on a deep submarine channel running along the coast for nearly 2 km. Underwater explorations have revealed quays and jetties that allowed ships, after following the channel, to reach the shallow zone to dock. In front of the *macellum*, a large jetty of cut blocks, dated to the Flavian period, has been identified: 80 m long, ending in a platform in 1.30–1.40 m of water, sufficient for ships. Built around the mid‑2nd century, it mainly served the *macellum* and the *horrea*.

Excavations near the forum have yielded numerous metal objects from the 1st century AD — keys, nails, bars, and waste — indicating metallurgical activity. In the sanctuary area, Aucissa fibulae and large Flavian nails confirm the importance of metalworking at Meninx.

=== Middle Roman period II (AD 117–235) ===
Under Hadrian and the Antonines, the forum of Meninx was extensively remodelled. A new monumental marble temple was built on the southwest side, replacing an earlier structure. A large basilica, richly decorated with imported marbles, was erected on the southeast side. The forum porticoes were reworked: the northeast portico received a new floor and marble revetments, while a second portico was added in front of the basilica. Finally, the northern temple, dating from the Augustan period, was completely redecorated with new revetments and given direct access from the square. Together, these interventions profoundly transformed the monumental appearance of the forum.

A bath complex dated to this period was discovered not far from the forum. Its modest dimensions recall the domestic baths common in North Africa from the 2nd century onward, but the absence of any connection to nearby houses suggests a small public neighbourhood establishment.

The high proportion of local amphorae shows that during this period Meninx relied primarily on agricultural and maritime products from the interior of the island. Wine imports remained limited to a few amphorae from Byzacena and Sicily (Catania, Naxos) in the 2nd–3rd centuries.

=== Late Roman period (AD 235–306) ===
The region underwent a profound economic restructuring beginning in the Severan period. At Meninx, evidence remains limited, but at the regional scale several sites on Djerba and the continental coast were abandoned in the early 3rd century, while Henchir Bourgou declined as early as the 2nd century. The causes remain uncertain; a reorganisation of the annona may have favoured major ports at the expense of smaller ones. A major sign of administrative reorganisation appears in the second quarter of the 3rd century, when the island began replacing the name “Meninx” with “Girba,” probably also for the city itself.

=== Early Late Antiquity I (AD 306–530) ===
In the 4th and 5th centuries AD, new monumental buildings were constructed outside the city, notably the three‑aisled Christian basilica to the west and another, smaller one to the north.

The city experienced a gradual abandonment of its central sectors: the forum, temples, *macellum*, and sanctuaries were stripped, their stones reused, and the paved streets became covered with layers of sand or refuse. The bath complex lost its function, was partially transformed into a dwelling, then collapsed before being abandoned in the 5th century. At the same time, vast areas — especially to the west — were invaded by enormous deposits of *murex* shells, indicating a booming purple‑dye industry. This economic specialisation led to a marked degradation of the urban environment and living conditions.

Despite urban decline, Meninx remained fully integrated into regional economic networks. Imports of amphorae from Nabeul, Greece, and Cyprus remained significant. Trade with Guellala intensified, supplying ceramics and *murex*, as well as stone blocks quarried near Meninx. Imports of wine, *salsamenta*, and cereals increased. Low‑quality red slip wares linked to trans‑Saharan trade (dates, hides, alum) reached Meninx via Tacapae, confirming the economic vitality of the region.

=== Early Late Antiquity II (AD 530–698) ===
In the 6th–7th centuries, only domestic structures continued to be modified: one house remained occupied with the addition of a kitchen and waste from a bone‑working workshop, while a Byzantine tower or lighthouse was erected in another dwelling. The large cistern and the neighbouring industrial complex were finally abandoned in the Byzantine period.

The end of purple‑dye production transformed the economy: *murex* disappeared, livestock shifted toward consumption, and dependence on imported agricultural goods increased. The population of Meninx declined sharply in the 6th–7th centuries, with inhabitants moving inland after the collapse of the activity that had sustained urban prosperity.

Meninx was completely abandoned at the end of the 7th century AD, at the same time as many other African sites such as Neapolis and Carthage, as well as Guellala and Ghizène on Djerba. Only a few traces of later activity have been found in the former sanctuary, in the form of ceramic fragments probably dating to the early 8th century — likely evidence of occasional visits by fishermen.

=== The “Afterlife” of Meninx (AD 698–1891) ===
After the abandonment of Meninx, its ruins were exploited as a quarry for the construction of several nearby mosques: el Guemir, el Hara, Fouzer, Moghzal, and el Hajar, all located within a radius of 4–10 km from Meninx. The submarine channel was reused as a navigable route from the 16th century onward, while the causeway linking Djerba to the mainland played a strategic role in the Middle Ages. The latest datable object — a 5‑centime coin from 1890–1891 found on the site — likely reflects the passage of French travellers or soldiers interested in the ruins.

== See also ==
Archaeological sites of Djerba

== Bibliography ==
- Ritter, Stefan; et al. (2024). Studies on the Urban History of Meninx (Djerba): The Meninx Archaeological Project 2015–2019. Deutsches Archäologisches Institut. doi:10.34780/76fu-8peb.

A – Introduction: The History of Research on Meninx and our Objective: Stefan Ritter & Sami Ben Taher

B – The Urban History of Meninx: A Synthesis of our Results: Stefan Ritter & Sami Ben Taher

C – Sector 2 – A Punic House and its Occupation until the End of Antiquity: Nicolas Lamare

D – Schnitt 6 – The Forum Basilica: Linda Stoeßel

E – Trench 5 – A Late Roman Domestic Building: Robert C. Arndt & Saskia Kerschbaum

F – The Northern Cistern Complex – Architectural Study of the Exposed Structures: Kilian Wolf

G – Schnitt 8 – A Sanctuary of Isis?: Marina Apatsidis; Alexander Köppe & Stefan Ritter

H – Introduction: Urban Layout – Results of the Magnetometer Survey: Stefan Ritter & Sami Ben Taher

I – Schnitt 3 – A Bath Building at the Forum: Christoph Lehnert & Stefan Ritter

J – The Quarries: Dennis Mario Beck
