= Gaius Aurelius Cotta (consul 252 BC) =

Roman general and statesman, consul in 252 and 248 BCE, censor in 241 BCE

Gaius Aurelius Cotta (fl. 252–231 BC) was a Roman statesman and general during the middle era of the Roman Republic. He was one of the two consuls of 252 BC, serving with Publius Servilius Geminus; both consuls carried on the war in Sicily against the Carthaginians with great success. Among several other places they also took Himera, but its inhabitants had been secretly removed by the Carthaginians. Afterwards Cotta borrowed ships from Hiero, and having united them with the remnants of the Roman fleet, he sailed to Lipara, the blockade of which he left to his tribune, Quintus Cassius, with the express order not to engage in a battle; but, during the absence of the consul, Cassius notwithstanding allowed himself to be drawn into an engagement, in which many Romans were killed. On being informed of this Cotta returned to Lipara, besieged and took the town, put its inhabitants to the sword, and deprived Cassius of his office of tribune. Cotta was celebrated for the strict discipline which he maintained among his troops, and of which several instances are on record. During the siege of Lipara one of his own kinsmen, Publius Aurelius Pecuniola, was scourged and degraded to the rank of a common soldier, because through his fault a part of the camp was set on fire, in consequence of which almost the whole camp fell into the hands of the enemy. It was probably during the same campaign, that he acted with great rigour towards the equites who refused to obey his commands. At the close of his consulship Cotta triumphed over the Carthaginians and Sicilians. In 248 he obtained the consulship a second time, together with his former colleague, Servilius Geminus, and again fought in Sicily against the Carthaginians. Carthalo in vain endeavoured to make a diversion by attacking the coasts of Italy.

Aurelius was censor alongside Marcus Fabius Buteo in 241, and was later magister equitum under the dictator Gaius Duilius in 231.

Preceded by Gnaeus Servilius Caepio; Gaius Sempronius Blaesus	Roman consul 252 BC; With: Publius Servilius Geminus	Succeeded by Lucius Caecilius Metellus; Gaius Furius Pacilus
Preceded by Publius Claudius Pulcher; Lucius Junius Pullus	Roman consul II; 248 BC; With: Publius Servilius Geminus II	Succeeded by Lucius Caecilius Metellus II; Numerius Fabius Buteo
Preceded by Aulus Manlius Torquatus Atticus; Aulus Atilius Calatinus	Roman censor 241 BC; With: Marcus Fabius Buteo	Succeeded by Lucius Cornelius Lentulus Caudinus; Quintus Lutatius Cerco
