= Publius Servilius Geminus =

Roman general and statesman, consul in 252 and 248 BCE

Publius Servilius Geminus was a Roman statesman and general during the middle era of the Roman Republic. He was one of the two consuls of 252 BC, serving with Gaius Aurelius Cotta. They fought against the Carthaginians in the ongoing First Punic War; Geminus and Cotta were very successful; they took several Carthaginian strongholds on Sicily (including Himera, but its inhabitants had been secretly removed by the Carthaginians). In 248 BC, he obtained the consulship a second time, together with his former colleague, Aurelius Cotta, and again fought in Sicily against the Carthaginians.

== Modern Sources ==
- Broughton, T. Robert S. (1951). The Magistrates of the Roman Republic Volume I: 509 B.C.–100 B.C. New York: American Philological Association. pp. 219, 226.
- Lendering, Jona (2022). De Vergeten Oorlog. Utrecht: Uitgeverij Omniboek. pp. 100, 108.

== Classic Sources ==
- Diodorus, Bibliotheca historica, book 23.
- Zonaras, Extracts of History, book 4, fragment 14.

| Preceded by Gnaeus Servilius Caepio; Gaius Sempronius Blaesus | Roman consul 252 BC; With: Gaius Aurelius Cotta | Succeeded by Lucius Caecilius Metellus; Gaius Furius Pacilus |
| Preceded by Publius Claudius Pulcher; Lucius Junius Pullus | Roman consul II; 248 BC; With: Gaius Aurelius Cotta II | Succeeded by Lucius Caecilius Metellus II; Numerius Fabius Buteo |
