= 152 BC =

152 BC in various calendars
- Gregorian calendar: 152 BC; CLII BC
- Ab urbe condita: 602
- Ancient Egypt era: XXXIII dynasty, 172
- Pharaoh: Ptolemy VI Philometor, 29
- Ancient Greek Olympiad (summer): 157th Olympiad (victor)¹
- Assyrian calendar: 4599
- Balinese saka calendar: N/A
- Bengali calendar: −745 – −744
- Berber calendar: 799
- Buddhist calendar: 393
- Burmese calendar: −789
- Byzantine calendar: 5357–5358
- Chinese calendar: 戊子年 (Earth Rat); 2546 or 2339 — to — 己丑年 (Earth Ox); 2547 or 2340
- Coptic calendar: −435 – −434
- Discordian calendar: 1015
- Ethiopian calendar: −159 – −158
- Hebrew calendar: 3609–3610
- Hindu calendars
- Vikram Samvat: −95 – −94
- Shaka Samvat: N/A
- Kali Yuga: 2949–2950
- Holocene calendar: 9849
- Iranian calendar: 773 BP – 772 BP
- Islamic calendar: 797 BH – 796 BH
- Javanese calendar: N/A
- Julian calendar: N/A
- Korean calendar: 2182
- Minguo calendar: 2063 before ROC 民前2063年
- Nanakshahi calendar: −1619
- Seleucid era: 160/161 AG
- Thai solar calendar: 391–392
- Tibetan calendar: ས་ཕོ་བྱི་བ་ལོ་ (male Earth-Rat) −25 or −406 or −1178 — to — ས་མོ་གླང་ལོ་ (female Earth-Ox) −24 or −405 or −1177

Year 152 BC was a year of the pre-Julian Roman calendar. At the time it was known as the Year of the Consulship of Marcellus and Flaccus (or, less frequently, year 602 Ab urbe condita). The denomination 152 BC for this year has been used since the early medieval period, when the Anno Domini calendar era became the prevalent method in Europe for naming years.

== Events ==
=== By place ===
==== Seleucid Empire ====
- The pretender to the Seleucid throne, Alexander Balas, makes contact with Jonathan Maccabeus offering him terms even more favorable than those offered by the king Demetrius I Soter. In particular, Alexander offers him the official appointment as High Priest in Jerusalem. In response, Jonathan withdraws his support from Demetrius and declares his allegiance to Alexander. Thus Jonathan becomes the first member of his family to achieve appointment as High Priest.

== Deaths ==
- Marcus Aemilius Lepidus, Roman statesman, consul, Pontifex Maximus and censor; as a praetor, he has been governor of Sicily in 191 BC.
- Marcus Porcius Cato Licinianus, Roman jurist, son of Cato the Elder by his first wife, Licinia.
- Zhang Cang, Chinese scholar, general and prime-minister (b. 253 BC).
