= Gaius Sempronius Blaesus (consul 253 BC) =

Roman general and statesman, consul in 253 BCE

Gaius Sempronius Blaesus was a Roman statesman and general during the middle era of the Roman Republic. He was one of the two consuls of 253 BCE, serving with Gnaeus Servilius Caepio. He was consul during the First Punic War against Carthage. During his consulship Blaesus led a Roman fleet to Africa and pillaged the Libyo-phoenician coast all the way to the island of Menix before sailing back to Italy via Panormus on Sicily. On his way back to Italy his fleet was hit by a violent storm sinking 150 ships.

Despite the disaster at sea Blaesus was awarded a Triumph for his African campaign.

== Sources ==
- Jona Lendering, De Vergeten Oorlog, Utrecht, Uitgeverij Omniboek, 2022, ISBN 9789401918640.
- Adrian Goldsworthy, The Fall of Carthage, Weidenfeld&Nicolson, 2006, ISBN 9780304366422.
- Polybius, The Histories, book 1.
- Diodorus, Bibliotheca historica, book 23.
- Zonaras, book 4, fragment 14.

Political offices
Preceded by Gnaeus Cornelius Scipio Asina; Aulus Atilius Caiatinus	Roman consul 255 BCE with Gnaeus Servilius Caepio	Succeeded by Gaius Aurelius Cotta; Publius Servilius Geminus
