= Gnaeus Servilius Caepio (consul 253 BC) =

Ancient Roman general and statesman

Gnaeus Servilius Caepio was a Roman statesman and general during the middle era of the Roman Republic. He was one of the two consuls of 253 BCE, serving with Gaius Sempronius Blaesus. He was consul during the First Punic War against Carthage. During his consulship Servilius Caepio commanded Rome's land forces on Sicily, while his consular colleague led a fleet to Africa.

== Sources ==
- Jona Lendering, De Vergeten Oorlog, Utrecht, Uitgeverij Omniboek, 2022, ISBN 9789401918640.
- Polybius, The Histories, book 1.
- Diodorus, Bibliotheca historica, book 23.
- Zonaras, book 4, fragment 14.

Political offices
Preceded by Gnaeus Cornelius Scipio Asina; Aulus Atilius Caiatinus	Roman consul 255 BCE with Gaius Sempronius Blaesus	Succeeded by Gaius Aurelius Cotta; Publius Servilius Geminus
