= Lucius Caecilius Metellus (consul 251 BC) =

Roman politician and general, victor of the Battle of Panormus

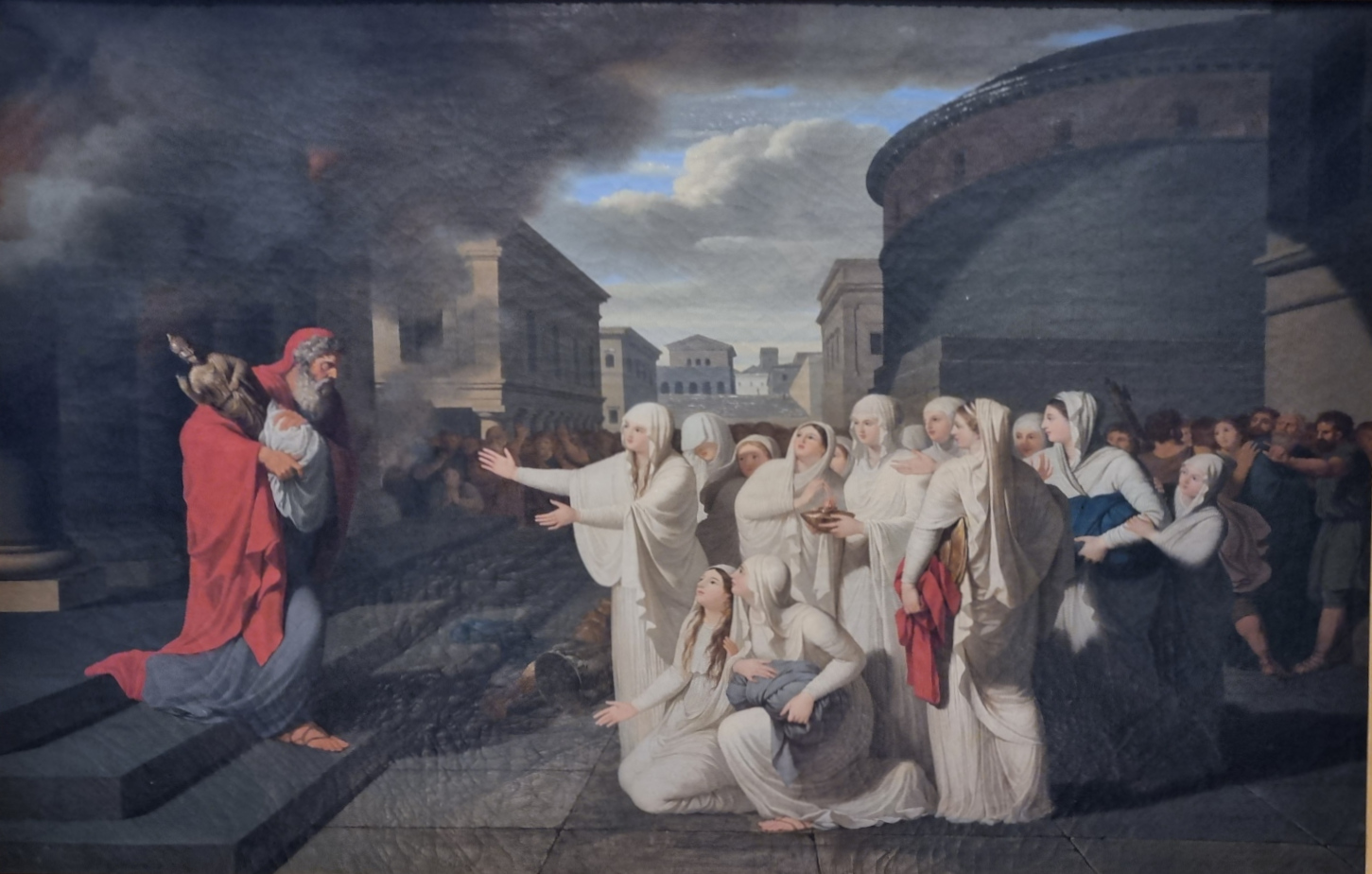
Vestals receiving the Palladium from Metellus, Bénigne Gagneraux (1794)

Lucius Caecilius Metellus (c. 290 BC – 221 BC) was the son of Lucius Caecilius Metellus Denter. He was consul in 251 BC and 247 BC, Pontifex Maximus beginning about 243 BC and Dictator in 224 BC.

In 250 BC, his consular powers were prorogued; then, as proconsul, he defeated the Carthaginian general Hasdrubal at the celebrated Battle of Panormus, a turning point of the First Punic War which led to Roman domination of Sicily. In that battle, after which he received the Honours of the Triumph, he defeated thirteen enemy generals and captured one hundred and twenty elephants, some of which he exhibited to the Roman people.

In this battle, so decisive for Rome, the Carthaginian advantage was subdued by luring the enemy to terrain where staked ditches had been dug. This, coupled with the element of surprise and a quick counter-attack, allowed the Roman infantry to rout the attacking Carthaginians.

While Metellus was Pontifex Maximus, a fire destroyed the Temple of Vesta and threatened to destroy the Palladium and other sacred objects. Lucius Caecilius Metellus, without hesitating, threw himself amidst the flames and reappeared with the tutelary symbol of the first Rome. However, his eyes were badly injured by the intense heat and he went blind, for which the Senate granted him the privilege of going by chariot to the Curia. In memory of that noble achievement of their ancestor, the Caecilii started to mint the image of Pallas on their consular coins.

He was the father of Lucius Caecilius Metellus, Quintus Caecilius Metellus and Marcus Caecilius Metellus.

== See also ==
- Caecilia gens

Political offices
Preceded by Gaius Aurelius Cotta; Publius Servilius Geminus	Consul of the Roman Republic with Gaius Furius Pacilus; 251 BC	Succeeded by Gaius Atilius Regulus; Lucius Manlius Vulso Longus
Preceded by Gaius Aurelius Cotta; Publius Servilius Geminus	Consul of the Roman Republic with Numerius Fabius Buteo; 247 BC	Succeeded by Manius Otacilius Crassus; Marcus Fabius Licinus
