= Gaius Furius Pacilus (consul 251 BC) =

Roman general and statesman

Gaius Furius Pacilus was a Roman statesman and general during the middle era of the Roman Republic. He was one of the two consuls of 251 BCE, serving with Lucius Caecilius Metellus. They fought against the Carthaginians in the ongoing First Punic War. They campaigned in Sicily, but achieved little.

== Sources ==
- Broughton, T. Robert S. (1951). The Magistrates of the Roman Republic Volume I: 509 B.C.–100 B.C. New York: American Philological Association. p. 213.
- Lendering, Jona (2022). De Vergeten Oorlog. Utrecht: Uitgeverij Omniboek. p. 101.

Political offices
Preceded by Gaius Aurelius Cotta; Publius Servilius Geminus	Consul of the Roman Republic with Gaius Furius Pacilus; 251 BC	Succeeded by Gaius Atilius Regulus; Lucius Manlius Vulso Longus
