= Numerius Fabius Buteo =

Numerius Fabius Buteo was a Roman politician in the third century and held the consulship in 247 BC.

== Family ==
He was a member of gens Fabia. His brother was Marcus Fabius Buteo, who held the consulship in 245 BC.

== Career ==
Numerius Fabius held the consulship himself with Lucius Caecilius Metellus during the First Punic War in 247 BC. Fabius waged war against the Carthaginians and besieged the town of Drepana, but was unable to take it.

In the year 224, Fabius served as Magister equitum with his former colleague, Lucius Caecilius Metellus as dictator.
