= 253 BC =

253 BC in various calendars
- Gregorian calendar: 253 BC; CCLIII BC
- Ab urbe condita: 501
- Ancient Egypt era: XXXIII dynasty, 71
- Pharaoh: Ptolemy II Philadelphus, 31
- Ancient Greek Olympiad (summer): 131st Olympiad, year 4
- Assyrian calendar: 4498
- Balinese saka calendar: N/A
- Bengali calendar: −846 – −845
- Berber calendar: 698
- Buddhist calendar: 292
- Burmese calendar: −890
- Byzantine calendar: 5256–5257
- Chinese calendar: 丁未年 (Fire Goat); 2445 or 2238 — to — 戊申年 (Earth Monkey); 2446 or 2239
- Coptic calendar: −536 – −535
- Discordian calendar: 914
- Ethiopian calendar: −260 – −259
- Hebrew calendar: 3508–3509
- Hindu calendars
- Vikram Samvat: −196 – −195
- Shaka Samvat: N/A
- Kali Yuga: 2848–2849
- Holocene calendar: 9748
- Iranian calendar: 874 BP – 873 BP
- Islamic calendar: 901 BH – 900 BH
- Javanese calendar: N/A
- Julian calendar: N/A
- Korean calendar: 2081
- Minguo calendar: 2164 before ROC 民前2164年
- Nanakshahi calendar: −1720
- Seleucid era: 59/60 AG
- Thai solar calendar: 290–291
- Tibetan calendar: མེ་མོ་ལུག་ལོ་ (female Fire-Sheep) −126 or −507 or −1279 — to — ས་ཕོ་སྤྲེ་ལོ་ (male Earth-Monkey) −125 or −506 or −1278

Year 253 BC was a year of the pre-Julian Roman calendar. At the time it was known as the Year of the Consulship of Caepio and Blaesus (or, less frequently, year 501 Ab urbe condita). The denomination 253 BC for this year has been used since the early medieval period, when the Anno Domini calendar era became the prevalent method in Europe for naming years.

== Events ==
=== By place ===
==== Seleucid Empire ====
- The second Syrian War between the Seleucids and the Ptolemies ends. Antiochus II regains much of Anatolia from Ptolemy II, including the cities of Miletus and Ephesus, and also the Phoenician coast.
- The war is concluded with the marriage of Antiochus to Ptolemy II's daughter, Berenice Syra. Antiochus divorces his previous wife, Laodice, and transfers the succession to Berenice's children.
- In recapturing the city of Miletus, Antiochus II overthrows the tyrant of the city. In response, the citizens worship him as a god in thanksgiving leading to the addition of Theos to Antiochus II's name.

==== Roman Republic ====
- A second Roman war fleet of 150 ships is wrecked on the voyage from Lilybaeum (in Sicily) to Rome.
- Tiberius Coruncanius is the first plebeian to be elected pontifex maximus of Rome.

==== Greece ====
- Alexander, Antigonus II's nephew and regent, leads a revolt in Corinth with Ptolemy II's help and declares himself an independent monarch. As a result, Antigonus loses Corinth and Chalcis, the two bases from which he has dominated southern Greece. As the Aetolians occupy Thermopylae, Antigonus II is cut off from Athens and the Peloponnese.
- Macedonia's involvement in the second Syrian War ceases when Antigonus becomes preoccupied with the rebellion of Corinth and Chalcis, as well as an increase in enemy activity along Macedon's northern frontier.

== Births ==
- Zhang Cang, Chinese general and prime-minister (d. 152 BC)
