= Victoria Park, Dorset =

Area of Bournemouth, Dorset

Coordinates: 50.746667°N 1.883333°W

Victoria Park
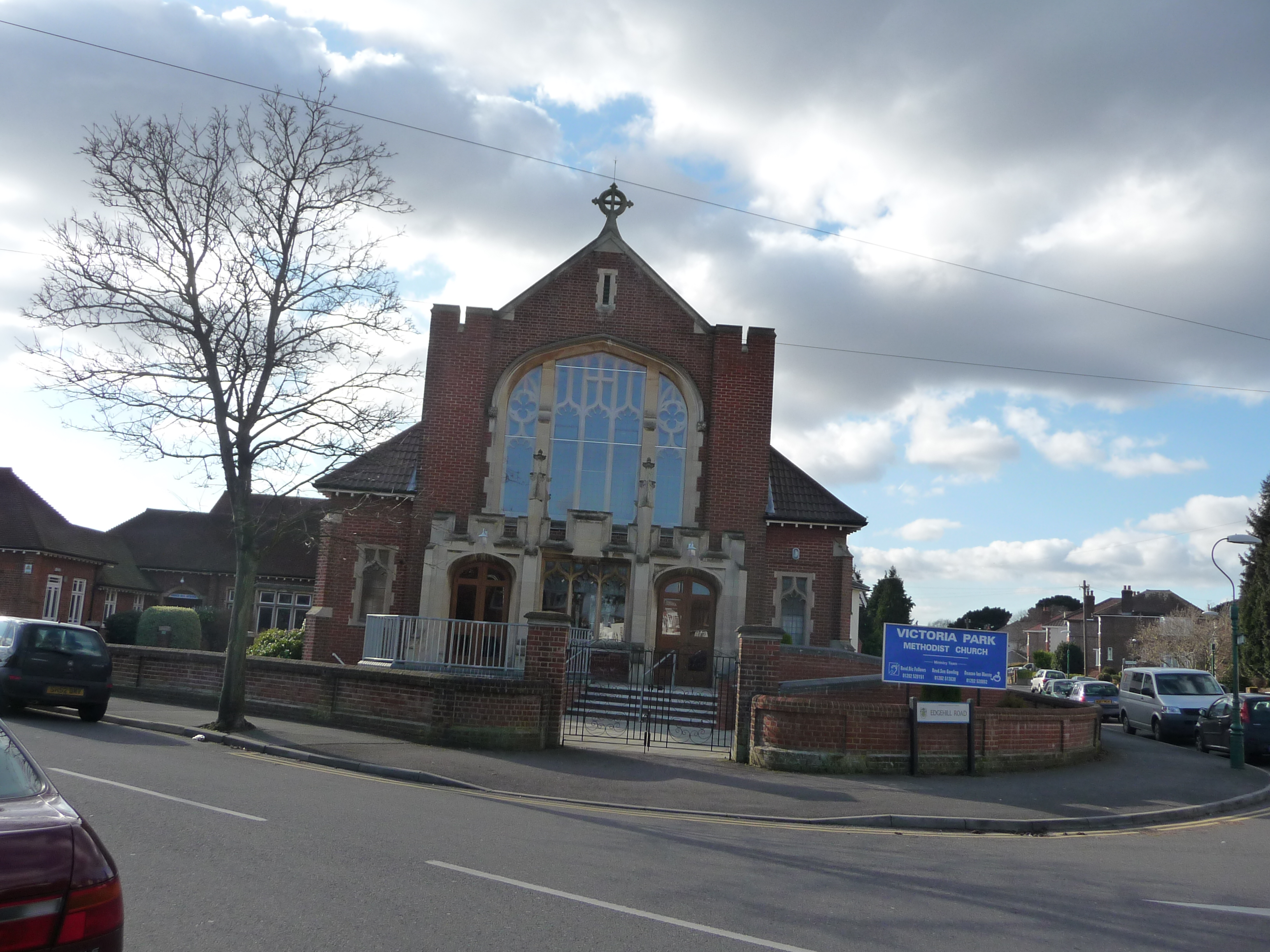
- Victoria Park Methodist Church

- Location within Dorset
- OS grid reference: SZ085935
- Unitary authority: Bournemouth, Christchurch and Poole
- Ceremonial county: Dorset
- Region: South West
- Country: England
- Sovereign state: United Kingdom
- Post town: Bournemouth
- Postcode district: BH3 and BH9
- Dialling code: 01202
- Police: Dorset
- Fire: Dorset and Wiltshire
- Ambulance: South Western
- UK Parliament: Bournemouth West

Victoria Park is an area of Bournemouth, Dorset. The area is located south of Moordown and Redhill, north-west of Winton and east of Talbot Village, Wallisdown and Ensbury Park.

== History ==
In 2020, an Experimental Traffic Regulation Order (ETRO) was created on Victoria Park Road to create a low traffic neighbourhood in Victoria Park.

== Facilities ==
Victoria Park has a Methodist church and is residence of the Victoria Park Football Ground, the home of Bournemouth F.C.

== Politics ==
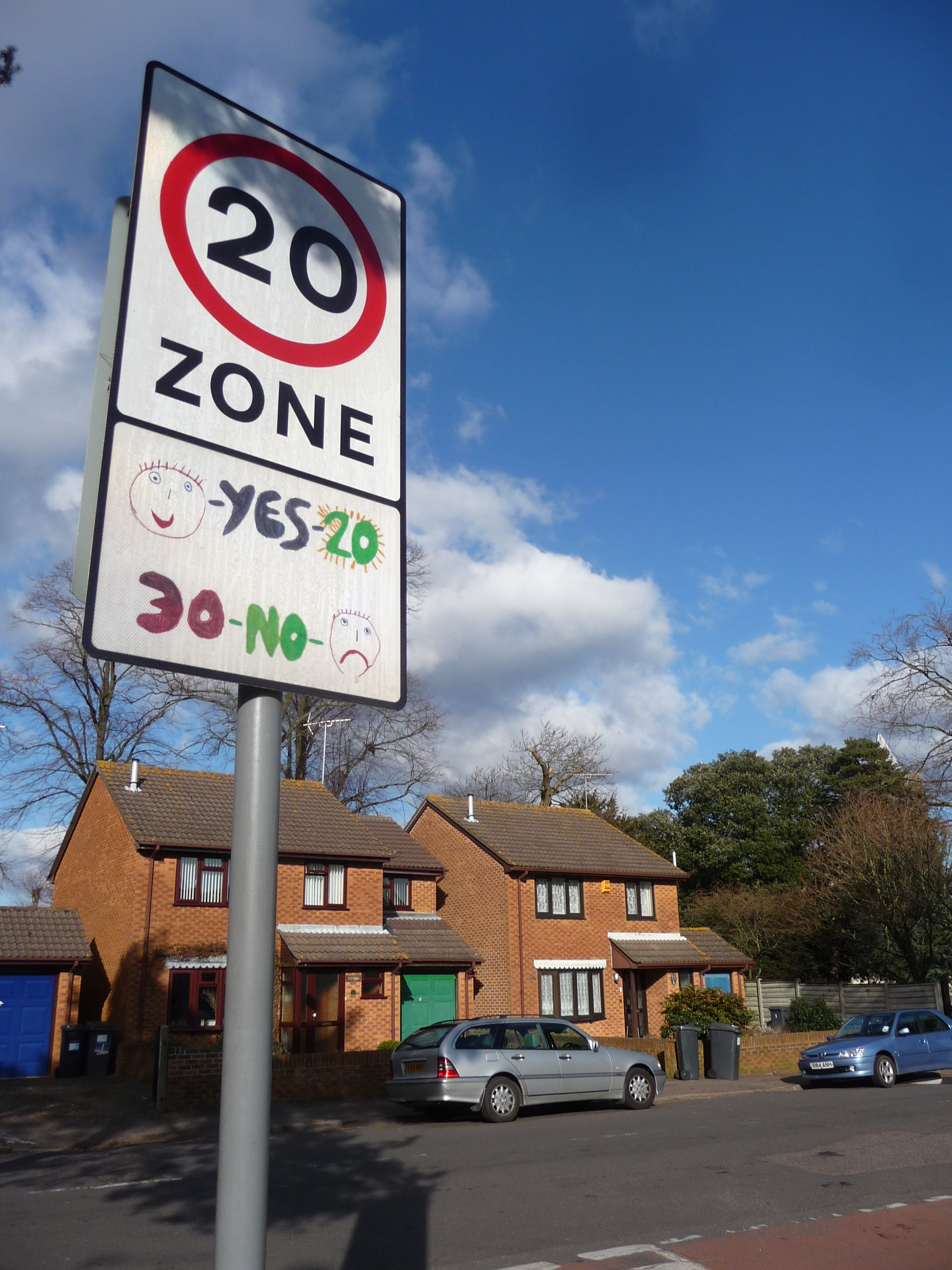
Victoria Park Road.

Victoria Park is part of the Bournemouth West constituency for elections to the House of Commons of the United Kingdom, currently held by Jessica Toale from the Labour Party.

Victoria Park is part of the Wallisdown and Winton West ward for elections to Bournemouth, Christchurch and Poole Council.
