= Mildred Gillett =

English local historian (1909–2014)

- Born: Miriam Mildred Annie Gillett; 17 April 1909; Wallisdown, Bournemouth
- Died: 15 July 2014 (aged 105); Talbot Woods, Bournemouth
- Education: St Mark's School; Talbot Heath School; London School of Economics
- Occupation: Schoolteacher
- Known for: Historian

Miriam Mildred Annie Gillett (17 April 1909 – 15 July 2014) was an English local historian. She wrote books on the local history of Bournemouth.

== Biography ==
Gillett was born to David and Susan Gillett in Wallisdown in 1909. She was the youngest of five children. She attended St Mark's Primary School and Alma Road School for Girls before moving to Talbot Heath School on a scholarship.

Gillett trained as a teacher at Stockwell Training College in London and did a social science course at the London School of Economics. Her professional career as a teacher started in 1932 at St Paul's School in Bournemouth, and six years later she became the headmistress of Hampreston Junior School. During the Second World War she volunteered as an air raid warden. In September 1955, she was appointed as headmistress at Colehill Junior School near Wimborne Minster. She retired in 1969.

In retirement she travelled to Australia and Japan, worked for the Citizens Advice Bureau and became a school governor at the former Summerbee Junior School. She also had an interest in local history. In 1976, she wrote Wanderings in Talbot Village in 1976, followed by Kinson 1894-1931 which was written with Edna Bevan in 1982. She published Talbot Village - A Unique Village in Dorset in 1993.

In October 1990, the Borough of Poole named the new Gillett Road in honour of her work on local history. The road runs between Talbot House and the Student Village at Bournemouth University. In 2017 the road was extended to the Talbot Avenue roundabout.

A churchgoer and teetotal, she celebrated her 105th birthday in April 2014. Mildred Gillett died on 15 July 2014 at a nursing home in Talbot Woods.

== Bibliography ==
- Gillett, Mildred, Wanderings in Talbot Village, Bournemouth Local Studies Publications (1976) ISBN 978-0906287293
- Bevans, Edna and Gillett, Mildred, Kinson 1894-1931, Bournemouth Local Studies Publications (1982) ISBN 978-0906287439
- Gillett, Mildred, Talbot Village - A Unique Village in Dorset, Bournemouth Local Studies Publications (1993) ISBN 978-1873887004
