= Wallisdown =

Area of Bournemouth and Poole, England

Coordinates: 50.746°N 1.912°W

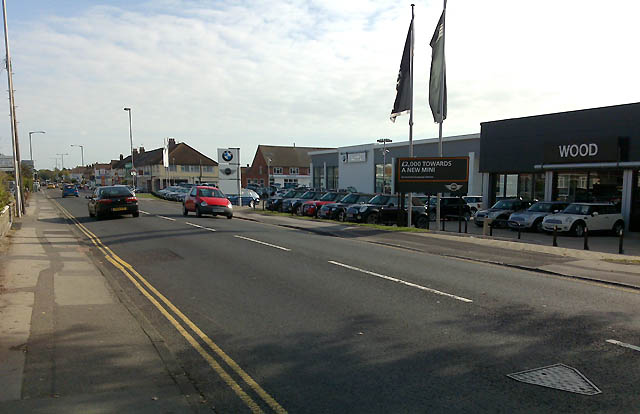
- Wallisdown Road

- Location within Dorset
- Population: 10,324 (ward, 2011)
- OS grid reference: SZ062941
- Unitary authority: Bournemouth, Christchurch and Poole
- Ceremonial county: Dorset
- Region: South West
- Country: England
- Sovereign state: United Kingdom
- Post town: BOURNEMOUTH
- Postcode district: BH10, BH11
- Post town: POOLE
- Postcode district: BH12
- Dialling code: 01202
- Police: Dorset
- Fire: Dorset and Wiltshire
- Ambulance: South Western
- UK Parliament: Bournemouth West

Wallisdown /ˈwɒlɪsˌdaʊn/ is a residential and commercial area situated partly in Bournemouth and partly in Poole, in southern England. The appropriate ward is called Wallisdown and Winton West.

== Geography ==
Wallisdown is situated on the border between Bournemouth and Poole. The main road through the area is Wallisdown Road which runs from Boundary Roundabout (adjacent to Bournemouth University) to Mountbatten Roundabout, Ringwood Road. Wallisdown is close to Alderney, West Howe, Slades Farm and Ensbury Park.

== Buildings and landmarks ==
The area has 19th century houses and cottages in Talbot Village, although there has been much development from the mid 20th century.

Local industries include Parvalux Electric Motors on Wallisdown Road, the UK's largest fractional horsepower motor manufacturer, next to cosmetics and healthcare giant Procter & Gamble.

== Community services ==
Schools that serve the area are Talbot Primary School and St Aldhelm's Academy for the Poole half and St Mark's School for the Bournemouth side (with a number of secondary schools in the north of Bournemouth).

Churches in the area include St. Mark's Church in Wallisdown Road, St Saviour's in Alton Road.

== Transport ==
Wallisdown is served by Wilts & Dorset which provide services to Bournemouth and Poole.

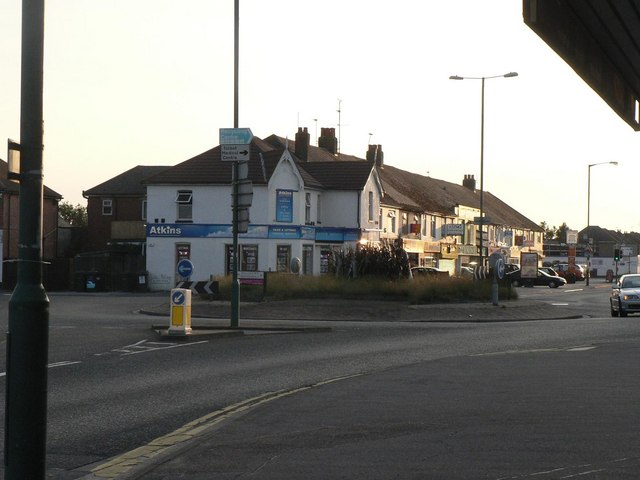
Wallisdown Roundabout

The main road running through the area (A3049) has for some years been overloaded with traffic and the area is blighted with congestion, particularly around the Wallisdown Roundabout. Dorset County Council has made three attempts in the last 20 years to build a relief road on a corridor of land reserved along the riverside behind Talbot Village to the Alderney roundabout, but has been unsuccessful, in part due to resident opposition to the scheme. Land is still reserved in various verges along Talbot Avenue and Wallisdown Road for dual carriageway upgrades. The Fern Barrow and Boundary Lane roundabouts have been built to accommodate this potential future upgrade, with the former being much too large for its purpose and the latter covered in red hatching where a second lane should run (near the university). There is, however, a 'pinch point' around Wallisdown Roundabout which would require a large (and costly) demolition programme that has made the scheme proposals financially unattractive.

== Notable people ==
- Mildred Gillett, local historian born in Wallisdown.
