= Lord Richard Cecil =

British soldier & journalist (1948–1978)

Lord Richard Valentine Gascoyne-Cecil
- Lord Richard Cecil
- Born: 26 January 1948
- Died: 20 April 1978 (aged 30)
- Education: Eton College
- Occupations: Soldier, politician & freelance journalist
- Parents: Robert Gascoyne-Cecil (father); Marjorie Olein Wyndham-Quin (mother)
- Relatives: Robert Gascoyne-Cecil (brother)
- Military career
- Allegiance: United Kingdom
- Branch: British Army
- Rank: Captain
- Unit: Grenadier Guards
- Conflicts: The Troubles; Rhodesian Bush War †

Lord Richard Valentine Gascoyne-Cecil (26 January 1948 – 20 April 1978) was a British soldier, Conservative politician and freelance journalist who was killed in Rhodesia whilst covering the country's Bush War. The second son of the 6th Marquess of Salisbury, Cecil was in Rhodesia with a freelance film-maker, Nick Downie, recording material for a television documentary about the war. Carrying a rifle and wearing a Rhodesian Army uniform, he was shot dead at close range by a member of the Zimbabwe African National Liberation Army. The Rhodesian government reported that Cecil had been "killed in action"; his body was returned to the United Kingdom for burial.

The Cecil family had long-standing connections with Rhodesia. The death of Cecil was mourned by his family and supporters. Britain and the United States had already planned negotiations between the Rhodesian government led by Ian Smith, Bishop Abel Muzoriwa and the ZANU PF and ZANLA leaders.

== Family ties ==
Cecil was the son of Robert Gascoyne-Cecil, 6th Marquess of Salisbury. His mother was Marjorie (Mollie) Olein Wyndham-Quin, granddaughter of the Earl of Dunraven and Mount-Earl, who had married his father in 1945.

The Cecil family had well established links with Southern Rhodesia, the capital city of which was named Salisbury after the third Marquess (it was renamed Harare in 1982 on the second anniversary of Zimbabwean independence). The family had extensive land holdings in the country and the fifth Marquess (Cecil's grandfather) was a leading British supporter of the white minority UDI government that ruled Rhodesia from 1965 to 1979.

Cecil was the eldest of the younger brothers of Viscount Cranborne, who has been both an MP and the Leader of the House of Lords. In July 2003, Lord Cranborne became The 7th Marquess of Salisbury upon the death of his father.

== Education and early career ==
Cecil was educated at Eton College and at the Royal Military Academy, Sandhurst. After graduating from Sandhurst, he was commissioned in the Grenadier Guards. After three tours of duty in Northern Ireland (mentioned in dispatches in 1973) he attained the rank of captain. He decided not to pursue a career in the military and resigned his commission with a view to pursuing a career in politics.

He enrolled on a degree course in politics at the University of Sussex in 1973, although it is believed that he rarely attended classes and never graduated. In July 1974, he was selected as the Conservative Party candidate for Barrow in Furness and contested the seat at the October 1974 general election. During the election campaign, he complained about the restraints being placed on military action in Northern Ireland by politicians. He suggested the possibility of making military incursions into the Republic of Ireland to kill Provisional IRA members sheltering there. The sitting Labour MP defeated Cecil by 7,400 votes and there was a 3% swing from Conservative to Labour in the constituency. Thereafter, he decided to become a freelance journalist while seeking a winnable Conservative seat to contest at the next election.

== Journalism and Rhodesia ==
Cecil's military background and social connections led him to Southern Africa in the mid 1970s, at a time when political unrest in Rhodesia was leading to a state of war between the white-minority government and black nationalist guerrilla forces. He quickly established friendships with prominent Rhodesians including the Foreign Minister, P. K. van der Byl.

When the Bush War against black nationalists started in earnest in 1976, Cecil used his family connections to gain access to Rhodesian Army counter-insurgency operations. In particular, his friendship with "PK" allowed him access to events and locations that were off-limits to other journalists. He provided reports that were carried by a number of newspapers (including The Times and Time magazine). He also contributed reports to the British ITN TV news service.

Cecil would accompany Rhodesian Army units into action while himself wearing army uniform and carrying a rifle. His obituary (22 April 1978) stated that he was "prepared to carry a rifle ... and even to use it". He ignored warnings that such conduct was inappropriate and dangerous for a journalist. Cecil was a member of a 20 strong group of correspondents known as the "Bang Gang". This group was intimately involved in the Rhodesian cause, and went about their journalistic work heavily armed.

Cecil was nicknamed "Young Winston" by fellow journalists. This referred to similarities between the early careers of Cecil and Winston Churchill. The nickname was not used kindly in every case. Some of his fellow journalists considered that his conduct exposed all journalists in Rhodesia to the charge of being combatants – and being treated accordingly in certain eventualities such as capture.

== Death ==
On 20 April 1978, Cecil and freelance film-maker Nick Downie landed by helicopter in North East Rhodesia with an army "Fireforce" airborne unit. They both were parachute qualified and were often first and second in the stick to record the war literally first-hand. The two were recording material for use in a TV documentary they were making about the Bush War. While moving through dense undergrowth, Cecil encountered a ZANLA fighter who fired at him at a range of less than 5 metres. He was hit by two bullets, first in the thigh and then in the chest, and died after a few minutes. The Rhodesian Ministry of Defence reported him as being "killed in action". His body was returned to England for burial.

== Aftermath ==
P. K. van der Byl offered the following comment upon being informed of Cecil's death:

"Lord Richard was the finest young man I ever knew and represented the best of everything that made the Englishman great, and built the British Empire."

Cecil's funeral service was held at the Church of St Mary and St Bartholomew, Cranborne on 27 April. A memorial service was held for him at the Guards Chapel, Wellington Barracks, on 9 May. Both events were attended by the most prominent personalities from the British aristocracy (including Lord Mountbatten of Burma), the British army and the media.

The death of Cecil was one of a number of events during 1978 that brought UDI to an abrupt end. The loss of one man did not amount to much in the whole scheme of things, but it was the identity of that man and the nature of his loss that had an impact. One factor that had sustained UDI since 1965 was tacit support from some elements in the British establishment who were variously influenced by anti-communism, appreciation of the colonial era's achievements and a wish to safeguard investments. Cecil was the embodiment of that support. His death brought the UDI project into question and made certain people think very hard about the wisdom of it.

Nick Downie completed filming of the documentary he and Cecil had been engaged in. It was broadcast by Thames Television's 30-minute TV Eye programme under the title "Frontline Rhodesia".

In the 1979 British general election, Cecil's brother, Viscount Cranborne, was elected MP for South Dorset. In his maiden speech to the House, Lord Cranborne urged Rhodesian Prime Minister Ian Smith to end UDI and accept majority rule in Rhodesia under Abel Muzorewa.
