= 1954 Bournemouth West by-election =

UK Parliamentary by-election

The 1954 Bournemouth West by-election was held on 18 February 1954. It was held due to the resignation of the incumbent Conservative MP, Robert Gascoyne-Cecil. It was won by the Conservative candidate, John Eden. When Eden was elected, he was 28 and the youngest member of the House of Commons of the United Kingdom, known as Baby of the House.

By Election 18 February 1954: Bournemouth West
Party	Candidate	Votes	%	±%
Conservative	John Eden	20,695	69.68	+4.19
Labour	Henry Brinton	9,006	30.32	−4.19
Majority		11,689	39.36	+8.38
Turnout		29,701		
Conservative hold		Swing		
