= Victoria Park (Bournemouth) =

Football ground in Bournemouth

Victoria Park, Bournemouth
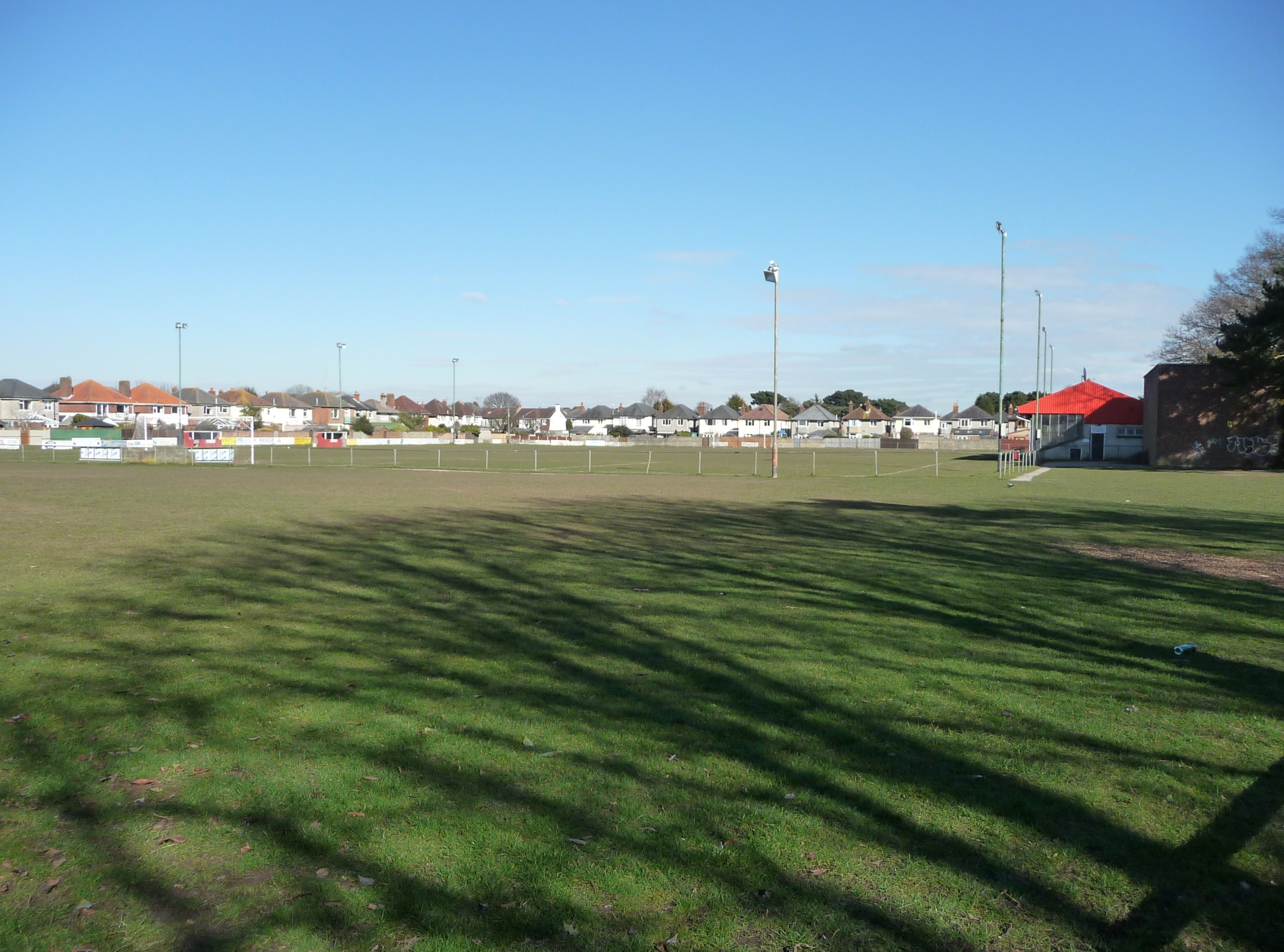
- Location: Namu Road, Victoria Park, Bournemouth
- Coordinates: 50°44′49.3″N 1°53′12.3″W
- Opened: 1890

Tenants
- Bournemouth F.C. (1890–present); Greyhound racing (1928–1934)

Victoria Park, Bournemouth is a football ground in Victoria Park in Bournemouth and has been the home of Bournemouth F.C. since 1890. It was also a short lived greyhound racing track from 1928 to 1934.

== Origins ==
The stadium is believed to have opened on the site of an old farmers field around 1890 when Bournemouth F.C. moved into the ground. The club continued to be the sole users of the ground off Namu Road until 1928 when a greyhound company took ownership of the site.

== History ==
=== Football ===
The ground was also known as the Victoria Park Sports Ground in later years but has remained the home of Bournemouth Football Club throughout.

=== Greyhound racing ===
The first meeting took place on Saturday 23 June 1928 following an earlier failed venture by the same company at nearby Ensbury Park Racecourse. There was six race card but both hurdle races were declared void due to greyhounds fighting which was a common occurrence in the early days of oval racing. The press blamed the problems on a large bird because it was reported as flying in front of the faces of the greyhounds upsetting them.

The first ever winner was Miss F Milburn's Cabaret over 525 yards in a time of 38.30 at odds of 7–4 on. The attendance was described as large and one of the stewards was Lord Robert Edward Innes-Kerr, husband of the famous actress of the time José Collins who christened the dummy hare.

This first meeting was held under National Greyhound Racing Club (NGRC) rules but it was also stated that nine previous meetings had been held by the company. These meetings mentioned however are believed to relate to the nine held previously at Ensbury Park based on the fact that the company and Racing Manager Reg Hermon were the same. The company went bankrupt before 1932 when the Southern Greyhound Racing Promotions Ltd purchased the stadium and spent £5,000 transforming the facilities. The new company also owned Banister Court Stadium which opened in 1928 so previous experience of running a track was an advantage.

The Director of Racing was T Bradbury-Pratt and the chairman was Ronald Prideaux (one of the original Southampton directors). Eight thousand people witnessed the reopening on Monday 1 Aug 1932; the racing behind the new mechanical hare (patented by Bournemouth's own Mr Mitchell) was a success and the kennel sweepstake over 400 yards was won by Mount Fergus, despite finishing second in his earlier heat on the same night. The racing schedule was set for every Monday, Wednesday and Saturday with no bookmakers allowed on course, all bets were tote only.

The stadium closed to greyhound racing on 29 September 1934 for unknown reasons but the council purchased the stadium for £4,500 in 1944 leasing it back to the football club.
