= St Mark's Church of England Primary School =

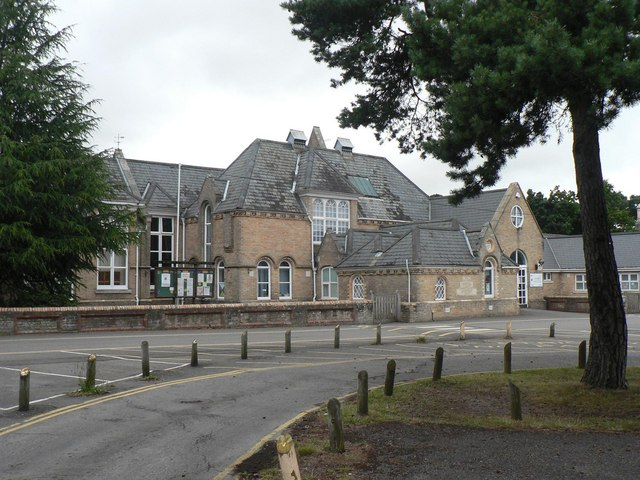

Location
- Talbot Village; Bournemouth, Dorset, BH10 4JA; England
- Coordinates: 50.7461°N 1.9000°W

Information
- Type: Academy
- Established: 1862
- Local authority: Bournemouth, Christchurch and Poole Council
- Department for Education URN: 142445 Tables
- Ofsted: Reports
- Head teacher: Andrew Bright
- Gender: Coeducational
- Age range: 4–11
- Enrolment: 418 (2023)
- Website: www.st-marks.bournemouth.sch.uk

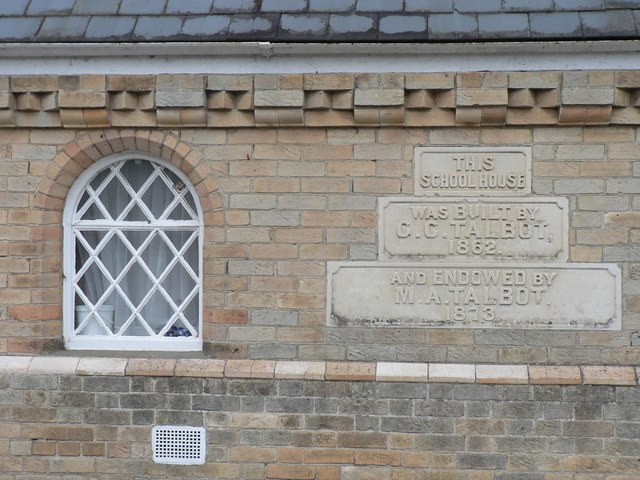
The foundation stones on the front of the building.

St Mark's Church of England Primary School is a coeducational Church of England primary school in Talbot Village, Bournemouth, Dorset, England.

== History ==
The school was built in 1862, and designed by Christopher Crabb Creeke. In 1962, the schools centenary, the school saw a large expansion. The expanded building was officially opened by local Member of Parliament John Eden in March 1967.

The school became a Grade II listed building in 1972.

== Connections ==
The school is joined with the nearby St Mark's Church, and close to Bournemouth University.
