= Robin Walker =

British Conservative politician (born 1978)

The Honourable Robin Walker
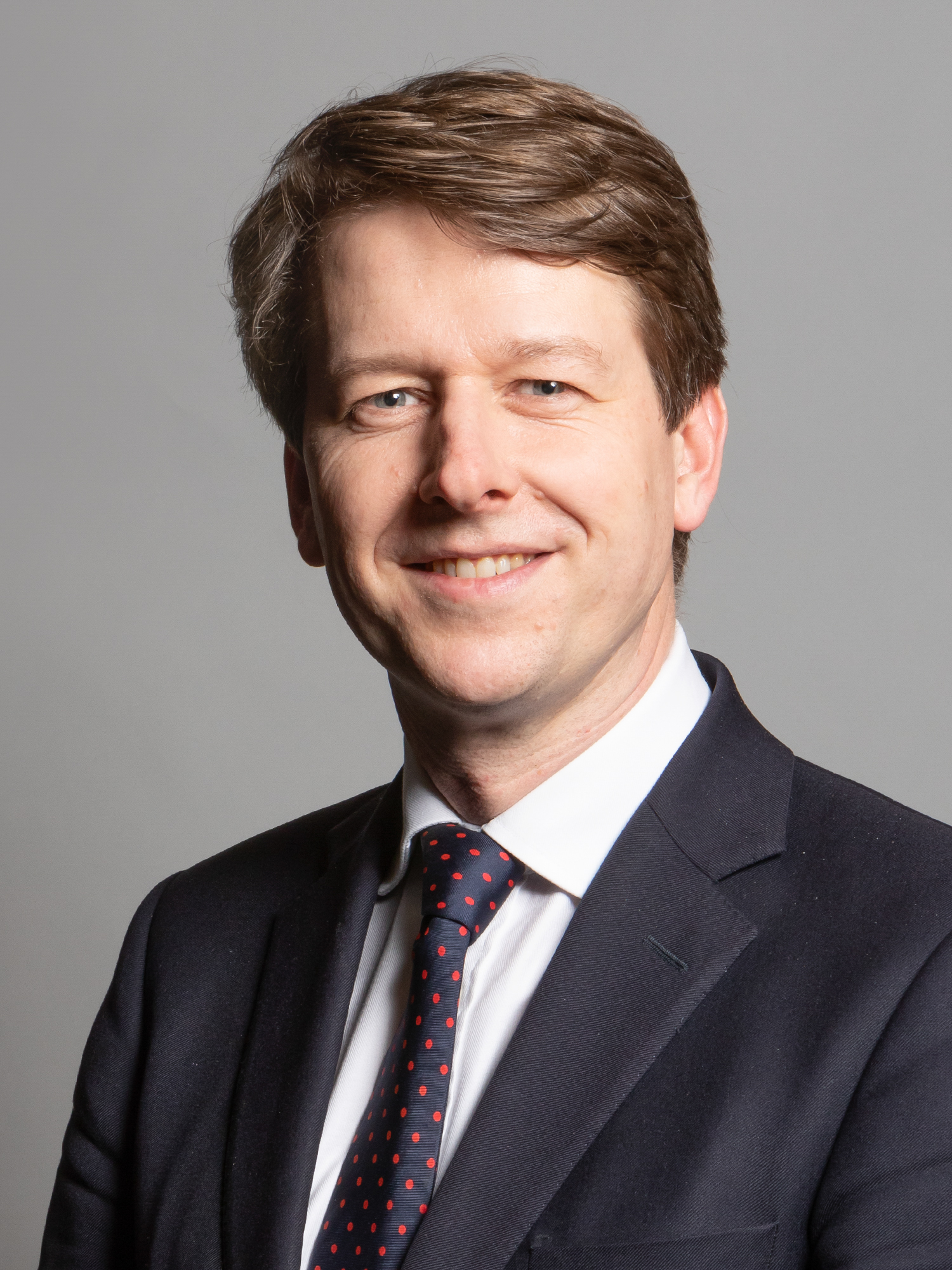
- Official portrait, 2020

Chair of the Education Select Committee
- In office 16 November 2022 – 30 May 2024
- Preceded by: Robert Halfon
- Succeeded by: Helen Hayes

Minister of State for School Standards
- In office 16 September 2021 – 6 July 2022
- Prime Minister: Boris Johnson
- Preceded by: Nick Gibb
- Succeeded by: Will Quince

Minister of State for Northern Ireland (Note: Parliamentary Under-Secretary of State (2019–2020))
- In office 26 July 2019 – 16 September 2021
- Prime Minister: Boris Johnson
- Preceded by: Nick Hurd
- Succeeded by: Conor Burns

Parliamentary Under-Secretary of State for Scotland
- In office 26 July 2019 – 16 December 2019 Serving with Colin Clark
- Prime Minister: Boris Johnson
- Preceded by: The Lord Duncan of Springbank
- Succeeded by: Douglas Ross

Parliamentary Under-Secretary of State for Exiting the European Union
- In office 17 July 2016 – 26 July 2019
- Prime Minister: Theresa May
- Preceded by: Department established
- Succeeded by: James Duddridge

Member of Parliament for Worcester
- In office 6 May 2010 – 30 May 2024
- Preceded by: Mike Foster
- Succeeded by: Tom Collins

Personal details
- Born: 12 April 1978 (age 48) London, England
- Party: Conservative
- Relations: Peter, Lord Walker (father)
- Education: Balliol College, Oxford
- Profession: Businessman
- Website: walker4worcester.com

Robin Caspar Walker (born 12 April 1978) is a British politician who served as the Member of Parliament (MP) for Worcester from 2010 to 2024. He chaired the House of Commons Education Select Committee from 2022 to 2024. He served as the Minister of State for School Standards from 2021 to 2022 and as a Parliamentary Under-Secretary of State at both the Scotland Office and Northern Ireland Office under Prime Minister Boris Johnson from 2019 to 2020. A member of the Conservative Party, he identifies as a one-nation Conservative.

== Early life and education ==
His father was Peter Walker, Baron Walker of Worcester, MP for Worcester from 1961 to 1992 and subsequently member of the House of Lords. Robin Walker was born in London, and was educated at St Paul's School, an independent school for boys in Barnes in West London, followed by a scholarship at Balliol College, Oxford, where he read Ancient and Modern History.

== Early career ==
After leaving university, Walker set up his own internet business, before pursuing a career in the City of London with the financial communications company Finsbury.

Walker has campaigned in three elections, working for Secretary of State for Health Stephen Dorrell in 1997, for Richard Adams, the Conservative Candidate for Worcester in 2001, and as press officer for Oliver Letwin, then Shadow Chancellor, in 2005.

== Parliamentary career ==
At the 2010 general election, Walker was elected as MP for Worcester, winning with 39.5% of the vote and a majority of 2,982. His father, Peter Walker, had previously been the MP for Worcester from 1961 to 1992.

Walker was one of a small group of Conservative MPs who rebelled from the party line and voted in favour of an in/out referendum on Britain's membership of the European Union. He ultimately supported the government's plan to hold a referendum by 2017, and voted against a rebel amendment to hold the referendum in 2014.

Walker has campaigned for fairer funding in education as a member of the cross party F40 campaign, which in 2014 secured an extra £350 million for lower funded areas – £5 million of which is earmarked for Worcestershire.

Walker was made the chairman of the All Party Group for Credit Unions in October 2014. Walker has supported a number of cross party initiatives on making credit unions available in post offices as well as helping them to compete with larger lenders. He had also received the Citizens Advice Parliamentarian of the Year Award earlier in the year, in recognition for his campaign for better regulation of pay day lenders.

In July 2014, Walker called on Prime Minister David Cameron to use "every tool in the box" to de-escalate the violence in Gaza, and bring both sides to the table. Later that year, Walker campaigned for a two-hour train service from Worcester to London, citing benefits to local constituents and businesses. He spoke on this topic during a parliamentary debate in the House of Commons, calling for a "faster and more frequent train service".

He campaigned for Scotland to remain part of the United Kingdom during the 2014 Scottish independence referendum.

At the 2015 general election, Walker was re-elected as MP for Worcester with an increased vote share of 45.3% and an increased majority of 5,646. After the election, Walker was made PPS to Secretary of State for Education Nicky Morgan and also sat on the House of Commons Select Committee for Administration.

Walker was opposed to Brexit prior to the 2016 referendum. In July 2016, he was appointed as Minister at the Department for Exiting the European Union, in the government led by Theresa May.

In October 2016, Walker formally debated a petition calling for the observance of a British Independence Day in the United Kingdom. Arguing against, he said that "tempting though that might be, I think the idea of an independence day would face fierce competition from the likes of St George's Day, Trafalgar Day and many more."

At the snap 2017 general election, Walker was again re-elected, with an increased vote share of 48.1% and a decreased majority of 2,508.

In July 2019, Walker was made the Minister of State for Northern Ireland. During his time in the role he helped introduce a number of reforms related to the right to abortion in Northern Ireland.

Walker was again re-elected at the 2019 general election, with an increased vote share of 50.8% and an increased majority of 6,758.

In September 2021, Walker became the Minister for School Standards, leaving his role with the Northern Ireland Office. He resigned from his role as schools minister in July 2022.

In November 2022, Walker was elected as Chair of the Education Select Committee by Conservative MPs. As such he also became a member of the Liaison Committee in the House of Commons.

Walker did not seek relection as an MP at the 2024 general election.

== Personal life ==
Walker is a long-term supporter of both Worcester Warriors and Worcestershire County Cricket Club (WCCC). He wore the WCCC tie whilst delivering his maiden parliamentary speech in the House of Commons.

On 9 April 2011, Walker married Charlotte Keenan, former chief executive of the Tony Blair Faith Foundation, currently managing director at Goldman Sachs. Their daughter, Hermione, was born in 2018, and their son, Freddie, was born in 2022.

When his father was appointed a life peer in 1992, Walker became entitled to the style of The Honourable as the son of a Baron.

== Notes ==
Parliament of the United Kingdom
Preceded by Michael Foster	Member of Parliament for Worcester; 2010–2024	Succeeded by Tom Collins
Political offices
Department established	Parliamentary Under-Secretary of State for Exiting the European Union; 2016–2019	Succeeded by James Duddridge
Preceded by The Lord Duncan of Springbank	Parliamentary Under-Secretary of State for Scotland; 2019; With: Colin Clark	Succeeded by Douglas Ross
Preceded by Nick Hurd	Parliamentary Under-Secretary of State for Northern Ireland; 2019–2020	Succeeded by Himself as Minister of State for Northern Ireland
Preceded by Himself as Parliamentary Under-Secretary of State for Northern Ireland	Minister of State for Northern Ireland; 2020–2021	Succeeded by Conor Burns
Preceded by Nick Gibb	Minister of State for School Standards; 2021–2022	Succeeded by Will Quince
