= John Butterfill =

British politician (1941–2021)

Sir John Butterfill FRICS
- Butterfill as an MP

Member of Parliament for Bournemouth West
- In office 9 June 1983 – 12 April 2010
- Preceded by: John Eden
- Succeeded by: Conor Burns

Personal details
- Born: John Valentine Butterfill; 14 February 1941 Kingston upon Thames, England
- Died: 7 November 2021 (aged 80) Hampshire, England
- Party: Conservative
- Spouse: Pamela Ross-Symons (m. 1965)
- Children: 4
- Education: Caterham School
- Profession: Surveyor; businessman; politician
- Awards: Knight Bachelor (2004)
- Website: Official website

Sir John Valentine Butterfill FRICS (14 February 1941 – 7 November 2021) was a British Conservative politician and businessman who served as Member of Parliament (MP) for Bournemouth West from 1983 until he stood down at the 2010 general election.

== Early life and career ==
Born in Surrey, Butterfill was educated at Caterham School and the College of Estate Management in London. In 1962, he began his career as a valuer with Jones Lang Wootton before becoming a senior executive with the Hammerson Group in 1964. He was a director at the Audley Properties Group (now the Bovis Homes Group) from 1969 until he became the managing director of the St Paul's Securities Group. He became a Fellow of the Royal Institution of Chartered Surveyors in 1974.

He was elected as the chairman of the Guildford Conservative Association from 1976 to 1982. In 1977 he became a senior partner in Curchod & Co Chartered Surveyors, where he remained until 1992. He was the director of ISLEF Building and Construction Ltd from 1985 to 1991 and the Pavilion Services Group from 1992 to 1994.

== Parliamentary career ==
In 1979, Butterfill contested London South East Inner at the European Parliamentary election but was defeated comfortably by Labour's Richard Balfe. He was selected to contest the Croydon North West by-election in 1981, which was caused by the death of Conservative MP Robert Taylor.

It came as a great surprise when Bill Pitt won the seat for the Liberal Party, on a 24% swing and with a majority of 3,254. He was subsequently chosen to contest the south-coast seat of Bournemouth West on the retirement of the veteran MP John Eden. Butterfill won the seat at the 1983 general election with a majority of 13,331 and remained the MP until 2010.

Butterfill remained a backbencher for the entirety of his parliamentary career. He was the Parliamentary Private Secretary (PPS) to the Secretary of State for Energy, Cecil Parkinson, in 1988, remaining Parkinson's PPS when he became the Secretary of State for Transport in 1989. His job ended when Parkinson resigned from the Cabinet at the election of John Major to succeed Margaret Thatcher in 1990.

Butterfill served on many select committees during his more than 20-year Westminster career. He was responsible for introducing many acts of Parliament including the Registered Homes (Amendment) Act 1991, the Insolvency Act 1994, and the Policyholders Protection Act 1997.

In 1995, he entered a bill to place the UK in Central European Time. It was opposed by many Scottish MPs.

He introduced the Financial Mutuals Arrangements Bill, which was renamed and became the Building Societies (Funding) and Mutual Societies (Transfers) Act 2007.

=== Expenses ===
In May 2009, as part of the Daily Telegraph's publication of details, the newspaper revealed that for five years, Butterfill owned a six-bedroom country house in Woking, Surrey, 80 miles from his constituency. At the time, he designated a small flat in his Bournemouth constituency, bought for £56,000, as his "main home". Said by Butterfill to have been purchased as a wreck, he submitted regular claims under the second home allowance for the cost of running the Woking house, which had a swimming pool and extensive grounds. This included £17,000 on servants' quarters alone, contributing up to £1,778 a month towards the mortgage interest, and was also reimbursed for council tax bills for the "staff annex", where his housekeeper and odd-job man lived.

Butterfill repaid £17,479 in discretionary repayments to the government related to the expenses row. However, Butterfill was only over-paid by a total of £2,032.47 for mortgage interest (£1,408 in 2006–07 and £625 in 2008–09). He was also overpaid by a total of £332 for council tax in 2005–06 (of which £47.66 was due to payments not being reduced for dissolution and £284.00 due to an incorrect adjustment when moving house). The total repayment recommended was £2,364.

== Dispatches lobbyist investigation ==
Butterfill was one of the MPs named in a 2010 sting operation. Butterfill allegedly told an undercover reporter that he would lobby to benefit a fictitious company and use his political connections for a payment of £35,000 a year. Butterfill was also seen on the Dispatches programme saying he had been one of the four people who persuaded David Cameron to stand for leader of the Conservative Party and that it was likely that he (Butterfill) would be made a peer and go to the House of Lords. The following day the Conservative Party leader David Cameron said: "I can tell you that is not going to happen."

In the final report of the Standards Commissioner, it was deemed that Butterfill did not breach parliamentary rules:

The Commissioner does not consider that any of the statements made by Sir John during the course of his meeting with the undercover reporter or any of the actions he took as a Member referred to in his statements were in breach of the rules of the House. He has not, therefore, upheld the allegations against Sir John.

== Personal life ==
He married Pamela Ross-Symons in 1965 in Surrey, and they had a son and three daughters. He was awarded a knighthood in the 2004 New Year Honours for "services to Parliament." He was a council member of the People's Dispensary for Sick Animals. His constituency included the centre of Bournemouth.

Butterfill died in Hampshire on 7 November 2021, at the age of 80.

Parliament of the United Kingdom
| Preceded by Sir John Eden, Bt | Member of Parliament for Bournemouth West; 1983–2010 | Succeeded by Conor Burns |
