= Talbot Woods =

Area of Bournemouth, Dorset, England

Coordinates: 50°44.3′N 1°54.1′W

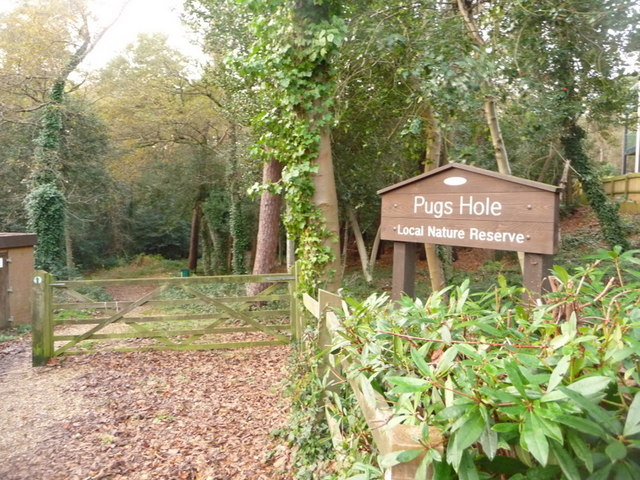
Talbot Woods, the main entrance to the Pug's Hole Nature Reserve.

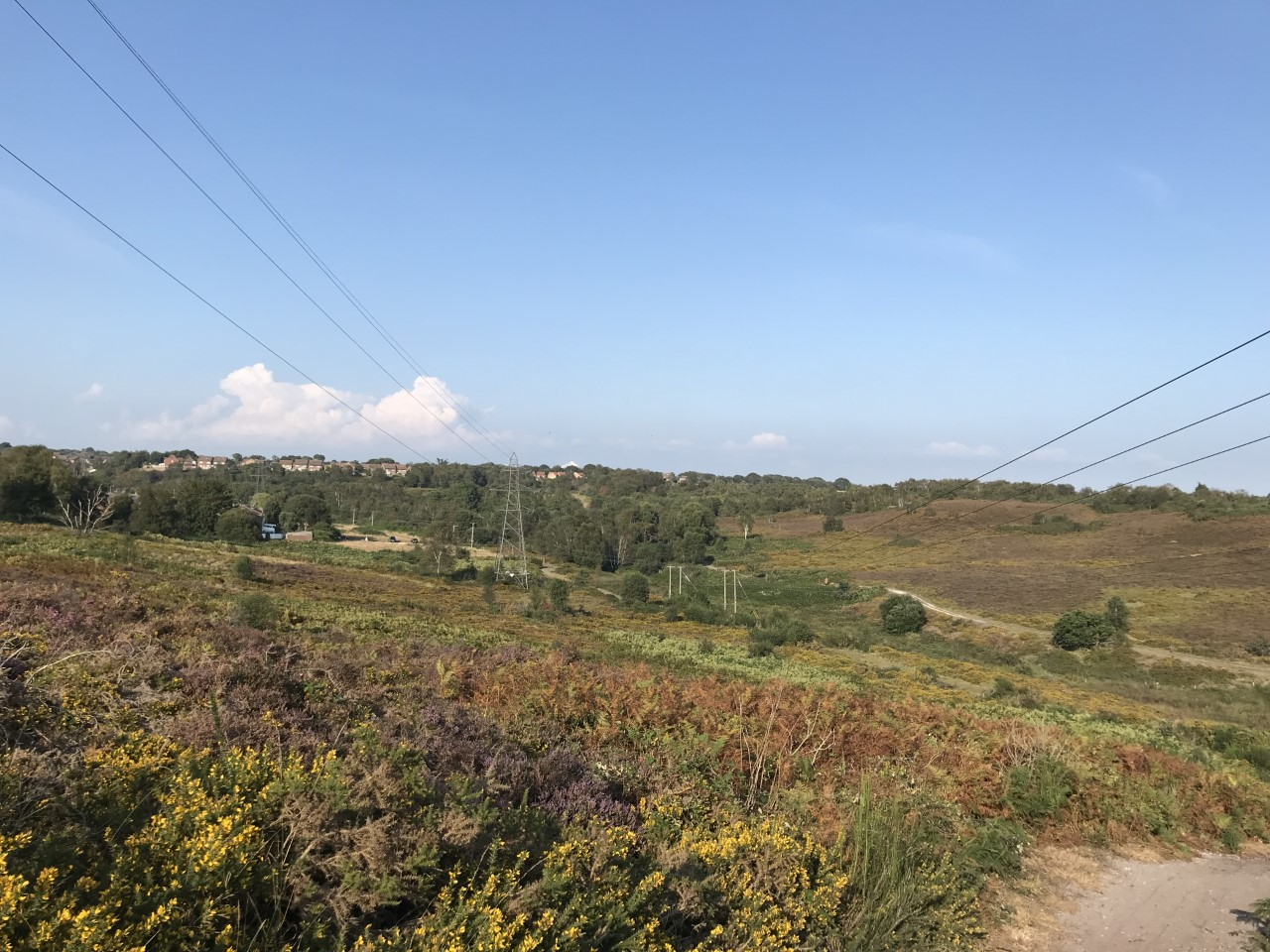
The main heathland area of Talbot Heath nature reserve.

Talbot Woods is an area of Bournemouth, Dorset, England. Talbot Woods is south of Talbot Village.

== History ==
Talbot Woods is known for its high house prices and affluent residents.

== Environment ==
Talbot Heath nature reserve is in the area. Dog-walking is allowed though it is advised to keep them on a lead in the areas that a few cows are allowed to graze. It is designated as a Special Protection Area for its bird populations and a Special Area of Conservation for its reptile populations and heathland habitats, as well as being part of the Bourne Valley Site of Special Scientific Interest (SSSI), meaning it is legally protected. This influenced the decision of the Secretary of State for Communities and Local Government in 2012 to refuse planning permission for 378 new houses on the neighbouring farmland in Poole, as the RSPB and Natural England argued in a public inquiry that the Talbot Village Trust's proposed risk mitigation measures would not prevent harm to the heathland.

== Education ==
Talbot Heath School is in Talbot Woods.

== Politics ==
Talbot Woods is part of the Talbot and Branksome Woods ward for elections to Bournemouth, Christchurch and Poole Council which elects three councillors. It is also part of the Bournemouth West constituency for elections to Westminster.
