= Ensbury Park Racecourse =

Defunct horse racing venue in the UK

- Interactive map of Ensbury Park Racecourse
- Location: Bournemouth
- Coordinates: 50°45′40″N 1°53′14″W

Construction
- Opened: 1925; 100 years ago
- Closed: 1928; 97 years ago

Ensbury Park Racecourse was a short lived horse racing and greyhound racing course in Bournemouth between the Kinson and Ensbury Park areas.

== Origins ==
A new 88 acre aerodrome was constructed near Bournemouth at the end of 1917. The Royal Flying Corps together with a Wireless Telephony School moved in and it became known as RFC Winton. The aerodrome was vacated after the war by the RAF and the site became used for civil aviation from May 1919.

A grandstand and racecourse was financed by the Ensbury Park (Bournemouth) Racecourse Company Ltd and built by Sir Robert McAlpine & Sons in late 1924-early 1925 on a significant portion of the airfield.

== History ==
Horse racing started on 17 April 1925 and finished on 11 June 1928. The racecourse was used as the guide for aircraft racing during 1926 and 1927.

The Ensbury Park Greyhound Company was registered in September 1927 with a capital of £10,000 and greyhound racing started on 7 January 1928 but the National Hunt stated that the greyhounds had to stop or they would withdraw permission for horse racing. The greyhound racing was independent (not affiliated to the National Greyhound Racing Club). Only nine meetings took place before the greyhound operation was transferred to Victoria Park in June 1928.

== Closure ==
The racecourse company went into voluntary liquidation in June 1928, the grandstand was demolished in 1934 and the land was sold and turned into housing that formed Leybourne and Western Avenue, Brockley and Brierley Road. Ironically if the greyhound racing had stayed the racecourse would have experienced the significant profits that greyhound racing brought during the following twenty years.
