= Minister of State for Northern Ireland =

British government minister

United Kingdom Minister of State for Northern Ireland
- Royal Arms of His Majesty's Government
- Incumbent; Vacant since 5 July 2024
- Northern Ireland Office
- Style: Minister
- Nominator: Prime Minister of the United Kingdom
- Appointer: The Monarch on advice of the Prime Minister
- Term length: At His Majesty's pleasure
- Website: Official website

The role of Minister of State for Northern Ireland is a mid-level position in the Northern Ireland Office in the British government. It is currently vacant, following the 2024 general election. The role is also known as Deputy Secretary of State for Northern Ireland.

== Responsibilities ==
The minister has the following ministerial responsibilities:

Driving economic and domestic policy

- Long-term economic recovery from COVID-19
- Promotion of the economy, levelling up and innovation - including City Deals and the Shared Prosperity Fund
- Leading the department's work on the most critical constitution and rights issues in NI

Supporting the secretary of state in their responsibilities, including:

- Legacy stakeholder engagement
- Strengthening and sustaining the Union in Northern Ireland
- Vital security casework
- Building substantive relationships across sectors and communities
- Leading workstreams on New Decade, New Approach agreement and the NI Protocol

== List of ministers of state for Northern Ireland ==
Name	Portrait	Entered office	Left office	Political party	Notes
Paul Channon		26 March 1972	5 November 1972	Conservative	
The Lord Windlesham		26 March 1972	5 June 1973	Conservative	
William van Straubenzee		5 November 1972	4 March 1974	Conservative	
David Howell		5 November 1972	8 January 1974	Conservative	
Stan Orme		7 March 1974	8 April 1976	Labour	
Roland Moyle		27 June 1974	10 September 1976	Labour	
Don Concannon		14 April 1976	4 May 1979	Labour	
The Lord Melchett		10 September 1976	4 May 1979	Labour	
Michael Alison		7 May 1979	15 September 1981	Conservative	
Hugh Rossi		7 May 1979	5 January 1981	Conservative	
The Earl of Gowrie		15 September 1981	10 June 1983	Conservative	
Adam Butler		5 January 1981	11 September 1984	Conservative	
The Earl of Mansfield		13 June 1983	12 April 1984	Conservative	
Rhodes Boyson		11 September 1984	10 September 1986	Conservative	
Nicholas Scott		10 September 1986	13 June 1987	Conservative	
John Stanley		13 June 1987	25 July 1988	Conservative	
Ian Stewart		25 July 1988	25 July 1989	Conservative	
John Cope		25 July 1989	28 November 1990	Conservative	
Brian Mawhinney		28 November 1990	14 April 1992	Conservative	
The Lord Belstead		28 November 1990	14 April 1992	Conservative	
Robert Atkins		14 April 1992	11 January 1994	Conservative	
Michael Mates		15 April 1992	24 June 1993	Conservative	
John Wheeler		25 June 1993	2 May 1997	Conservative	
Michael Ancram		11 January 1994	2 May 1997	Conservative	
Adam Ingram		2 May 1997	7 June 2001	Labour	
Jane Kennedy		7 June 2001	13 June 2003	Labour	
John Spellar		13 June 2003	10 May 2005	Labour	
David Hanson		11 May 2005	8 May 2007	Labour	
Paul Goggins		8 May 2007	11 May 2010	Labour	
Hugo Swire		12 May 2010	4 September 2012	Conservative	
Mike Penning		4 September 2012	7 October 2013	Conservative	
Andrew Robathan		7 October 2013	14 July 2014	Conservative	
Andrew Murrison		14 July 2014	12 May 2015	Conservative	
Ben Wallace		12 May 2015	17 July 2016	Conservative	
Andrew Dunlop		17 July 2016	9 June 2017	Conservative	
vacant		9 June 2017	9 January 2018		
Shailesh Vara		9 January 2018	15 November 2018	Conservative	
John Penrose		16 November 2018	25 July 2019	Conservative	
Nick Hurd		25 July 2019	16 December 2019	Conservative	
Robin Walker		13 February 2020	16 September 2021	Conservative	
Conor Burns		16 September 2021	6 September 2022	Conservative	
Steve Baker		6 September 2022	5 July 2024	Conservative	
vacant		5 July 2024			

== See also ==
- Secretary of State for Northern Ireland
- Northern Ireland Office
