= Robert Gascoyne-Cecil, 6th Marquess of Salisbury =

English landowner and conservative politician

The Most Honourable The Marquess of Salisbury DL

Member of the House of Lords Lord Temporal
- In office 23 February 1972 – 11 November 1999; Hereditary Peerage
- Preceded by: The 5th Marquess of Salisbury
- Succeeded by: seat abolished

Member of Parliament for Bournemouth West
- In office 23 February 1950 – 8 January 1954
- Preceded by: constituency established
- Succeeded by: John Eden

Personal details
- Born: Robert Edward Peter Gascoyne-Cecil; 24 October 1916
- Died: 11 July 2003 (aged 86)
- Party: Conservative
- Spouse: Marjorie Olein Wyndham-Quin
- Children: Robert Michael James, 7th Marquess; Richard Valentine; Charles Edward Vere; Valentine William; Henry; Rose Alice; Michael Hugh
- Parent(s): Robert Gascoyne-Cecil, 5th Marquess of Salibury; Elizabeth Cavendish

Military service
- Allegiance: United Kingdom
- Branch/service: British Army
- Unit: Grenadier Guards
- Battles/wars: World War II: Invasion of Normandy

Robert Edward Peter Gascoyne-Cecil, 6th Marquess of Salisbury, DL (24 October 1916 – 11 July 2003), styled Viscount Cranborne from 1947 to 1972, was a British landowner and Conservative politician.

== Early life ==
Salisbury was the eldest and only surviving son of Robert Gascoyne-Cecil, 5th Marquess of Salisbury, by Elizabeth Vere Cavendish, daughter of Lord Richard Cavendish. During the Second World War he served in the Grenadier Guards. He took part in the invasion of Normandy in 1944 with the 2nd Battalion and was a member of the first British unit to enter Brussels. He was later appointed Military Assistant to Harold Macmillan, then the Resident Minister in North Africa.

He later sat as Conservative member of parliament for Bournemouth West from 1950 to 1954. In 1972 he succeeded his father in the marquessate and entered the House of Lords. He also succeeded his father as President of the Conservative Monday Club. He supported The Salisbury Review and was also president of the Anglo-Rhodesian Society and Friends of the Union.

== Royal Commission on Historical Monuments of England ==
Salisbury was appointed chairman of the Royal Commission on Historical Monuments of England on 30 December 1957.

== Property ==
Lord Salisbury ran holdings of 8,500 acres around Hatfield House, and 1,300 acres at Cranborne Manor, Dorset. At the time of his obituary he owned property around Leicester and Leicester Square, London, held by Gascoyne Holdings.

== Marriage and children ==
Lord Salisbury married Marjorie "Mollie" Olein Wyndham-Quin (15 July 1922 – 12 December 2016), granddaughter of Windham Wyndham-Quin, 5th Earl of Dunraven and Mount-Earl, on 18 December 1945. Lady Salisbury was a noted gardener.

They had seven children, six sons and a daughter:

- Robert Michael James Gascoyne-Cecil, 7th Marquess of Salisbury (b. 30 September 1946)
- Lord Richard Valentine Gascoyne-Cecil (26 January 1948 – 20 April 1978)
- Lord Charles Edward Vere Gascoyne-Cecil (b. 13 July 1949)
- Lord Valentine William Gascoyne-Cecil (b. 13 May 1952)
- Hon. Henry Gascoyne-Cecil (3 May 1955 – 6 May 1955)
- Lady Rose Alice Elizabeth Cecil (b. 11 September 1956)
- Lord Michael Hugh Cecil (b. 23 March 1960)

Parliament of the United Kingdom
New constituency	Member of Parliament for Bournemouth West; 1950–1954	Succeeded by John Eden
Peerage of Great Britain
Preceded by Robert Gascoyne-Cecil	Marquess of Salisbury; 1972–2003	Succeeded by Robert Gascoyne-Cecil
Peerage of England
Preceded by Robert Gascoyne-Cecil	Baron Cecil descended by acceleration 1972–1992	Succeeded by Robert Gascoyne-Cecil
