= Wallisdown and Winton West =

Electoral ward in Bournemouth, Dorset, England

Boundary of Wallisdown and Winton West in Bournemouth, Christchurch and Poole.

Wallisdown and Winton West is a ward in Bournemouth, Dorset. Since 2019, the ward has elected 2 councillors to Bournemouth, Christchurch and Poole Council.

== History ==
The ward formerly elected councillors to Bournemouth Borough Council before it was abolished in 2019.

== Geography ==
The Wallisdown and Winton West ward is in Bournemouth, covering the suburbs of Wallisdown, Talbot Village, Slades Farm, Victoria Park, the southern areas of Ensbury Park and Redhill and the western areas of Winton.

== Elections ==
=== 2023 ===
Wallisdown and Winton West
Party	Candidate	Votes	%	±%
Liberal Democrats	Olivia Maria Brown	1,108	53.1	+36.0
Liberal Democrats	Richard Herrett	951	45.6	+32.0
Conservative	Nigel Patrick Hedges‡	477	22.9	−19.5
Conservative	Toby William Johnson (Note: Incumbent councillor for Alderney & Bourne Valley; elected as Liberal Democrat)	416	20.0	−20.4
Labour	Julia Elizabeth Harding Drage	352	16.9	+0.7
Green	Matthew Peter Burgress	318	15.3	−5.5
Labour	Michael Cracknell	303	14.5	−2.9
Majority				
Turnout		2,085	28.79	
Liberal Democrats gain from Conservative		Swing		
Liberal Democrats gain from Conservative		Swing		

=== 2019 ===
Wallisdown and Winton West (2 seats)
Party	Candidate	Votes	%	±%
Conservative	Nigel Hedges	872	42.4	
Conservative	Susan Phillips	831	40.4	
Green	Matthew Burgess	427	20.8	
Green	Chris Henderson	387	18.8	
Labour	Michael Cracknell	357	17.4	
Liberal Democrats	Ines Antunovic-Thomson	352	17.1	
Labour	Lloyd Owen	334	16.2	
Liberal Democrats	Martin Rodger	280	13.6	
Majority				
Turnout		2,056		
Conservative win (new seat)				
Conservative win (new seat)				
