= Conor Burns =

British politician (born 1972)

The Right Honourable Sir Conor Burns
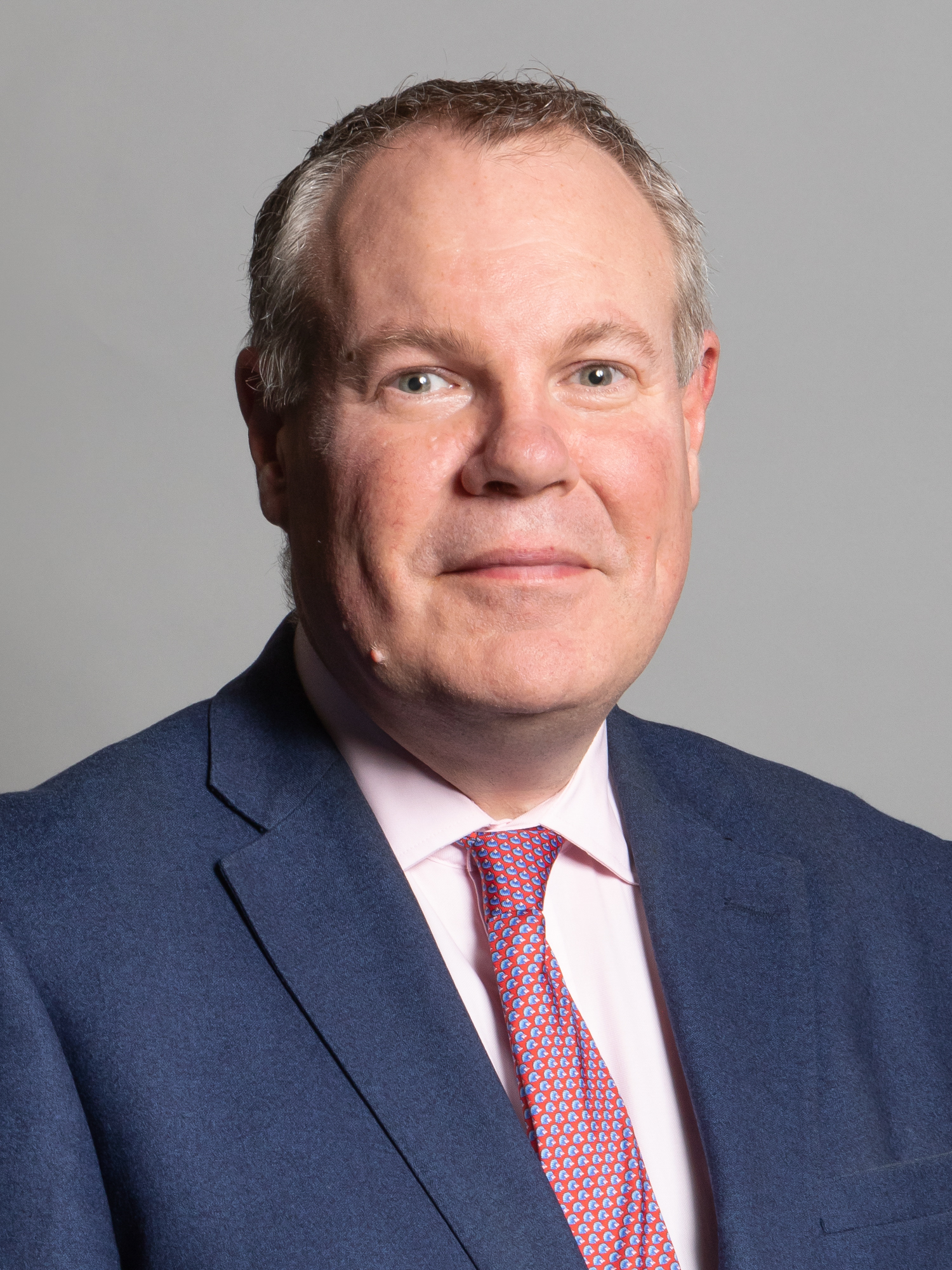
- Official portrait, 2020

Minister of State for Trade Policy
- In office 7 September 2022 – 7 October 2022
- Prime Minister: Liz Truss
- Preceded by: Penny Mordaunt
- Succeeded by: Greg Hands
- In office 25 July 2019 – 4 May 2020
- Prime Minister: Boris Johnson
- Preceded by: George Hollingbery
- Succeeded by: Greg Hands

Minister of State for Northern Ireland
- In office 16 September 2021 – 7 September 2022
- Prime Minister: Boris Johnson
- Preceded by: Robin Walker
- Succeeded by: Steve Baker

Member of Parliament for Bournemouth West
- In office 6 May 2010 – 30 May 2024
- Preceded by: John Butterfill
- Succeeded by: Jessica Toale

Personal details
- Born: 24 September 1972 (age 53) Belfast, Northern Ireland
- Party: Conservative
- Education: University of Southampton

Sir Conor Burns (born 24 September 1972) is a British politician who served as the Member of Parliament (MP) for Bournemouth West from 2010 to 2024. A member of the Conservative Party, he served as Minister of State for Trade Policy from 2019 to 2020 and again in 2022 and Minister of State for Northern Ireland from 2021 to 2022.

Born in Belfast, Burns moved to Hertfordshire aged eight. He worked in finance and communications before being elected for Bournemouth West at the 2010 general election. He served as Parliamentary Private Secretary (PPS) to Secretary of State for Northern Ireland Owen Paterson from 2010 to 2012, when he resigned due to his opposition to the House of Lords Reform Bill 2012. He served as PPS to Foreign Secretary Boris Johnson, before resigning from the post in 2018 because he wanted to speak more openly on other areas of policy. Following Johnson's appointment as Prime Minister, Burns served as Minister of State for Trade Policy. He resigned from the post in 2020, after a Commons Select Committee on Standards inquiry found that he had threatened to use parliamentary privilege to intimidate a member of the public for his family's gain during a financial dispute involving his father.

In the 2021 cabinet reshuffle, Johnson re-appointed Burns to his government as Minister of State for Northern Ireland. He returned as Minister of State for Trade Policy after Liz Truss became Prime Minister in September 2022. Truss dismissed Burns from the post the following month when he had the whip suspended following an allegation of misconduct at the 2022 Conservative Party Conference. He was later cleared of misconduct and the whip was restored on 3 December 2022.

== Early life and career ==
Burns was born on 24 September 1972 in Belfast and moved with his family to Hertfordshire in 1980. He was privately educated at St Columba's College, St Albans, and read Modern History and Politics at the University of Southampton. While at university, he was chairman of Southampton University Conservative Association from 1992 to 1993, and chairman of Wessex Area Conservatives from 1993 to 1994.

He held a number of jobs in the communications and finance sectors, including as director of the Policy Research Centre for Business Ltd, company secretary for DeHavilland Global Knowledge Distribution plc, manager for Zurich Advice Network and associate director of the public affairs company PLMR.

== Early political career ==
Burns stood unsuccessfully as the Conservative candidate in the Peartree ward of Southampton City Council in 1994 and the Woolston ward in 1995. In the run-up to the 1994 election Burns was criticised for referring to hecklers as "spastics" and calling a woman a "hunchback". He subsequently faced a students union disciplinary hearing as the vice-president of the Southampton Conservative Association. He again stood unsuccessfully for the Conservatives in the Peartree ward in 1996, before being elected in the St Luke's ward in 1999. He was Conservative Group Leader from 2001. However, in May 2002, the whole council was up for re-election and Burns came off the council after being defeated in Bassett ward.

He stood unsuccessfully as the Conservative Party candidate for Eastleigh at the 2001 general election. He was an unsuccessful candidate at the Hedge End Town Council elections in Eastleigh in 2005. He stood again as the Conservative Party candidate for the Eastleigh constituency at the 2005 general election, but was again defeated.

He was the vice-president of the Young Britons' Foundation, an Anglo-American conservative training and education organisation, before the 2010 general election. He went on to be awarded the Young Britons' Foundation Golden Dolphin award "for his stoic support for the Young Britons' Foundation since its creation in 2003".

== Parliamentary career ==
Conor Burns was a member of the A-List of candidates and was selected in September 2008 as the Conservative Party candidate for Bournemouth West. He was elected for the seat at the 2010 general election.

Burns was appointed as Parliamentary Private Secretary (PPS) to Hugo Swire, the Minister of State for Northern Ireland, in 2010, before which he briefly sat on the Education Select Committee. On 10 July 2012 he resigned as PPS to Secretary of State for Northern Ireland Owen Paterson to vote against the Coalition's House of Lords Reform Bill, of which he had been a consistent critic. He has also served in Parliament as a member of the Administration Committee and the Culture, Media and Sport Committee.

In 2011, he abstained on the military intervention in Libya.

In 2014, Burns referred the charity Oxfam to the Charity Commission, stating that a tweet from the charity was "overtly political". He later criticised a letter from Church of England bishops urging Christians to engage with the 2015 election as "naive" and "factually wrong".

Alongside his work as an MP, Burns works as a consultant for Trant Engineering Ltd., earning £10,000 quarterly for 10 hours' work a month. He acts as a consultant for the Quantum Group, real estate developers, working six hours a month for a quarterly fee of £6,250. In 2015, an article in Private Eye implied that Burns' opposition to Navitus Bay Windfarm and subsidies for renewables was due to his connections to the oil and gas industry through Trant Engineering.

He has chaired the All-Party Parliamentary Group on Bahrain; he has written articles defending the Kingdom's human rights record. He accepted all-expenses paid trips to Bahrain while it was facing mass pro-democracy protests which were later repressed.

In August 2017, he said his Twitter account was hacked after it sent a series of aggressive posts to Michel Barnier's account demanding how the UK's Brexit bill was legally calculated.

Burns resigned as PPS to Foreign Secretary Boris Johnson on 9 July 2018 because he wanted to speak more openly on other areas of policy.

In October 2018, Burns was investigated by his party over allegations of racist remarks about travellers in a letter to his local newspaper, following the arrival of a traveller encampment in the centre of Bournemouth. Burns said: "These people think the normal rules of civilised society do not apply to them” and stated those involved in the encampment had turned the town into "a no go area for local residents and visitors."

Burns was appointed as Minister of State for Trade Policy following the appointment of Johnson as Prime Minister. He resigned from this position on 4 May 2020 after a Commons Select Committee on Standards investigation led by the Parliamentary Commissioner for Standards found he had intimidated a member of the public. He had written a letter on House of Commons notepaper in February 2019 in which he threatened to use parliamentary privilege to reveal the name of the director of a company which owed his father money as part of a long-running financial dispute and who had previously held a senior position in local government. Burns initially denied the claim as he stated he was allowed to use parliamentary privilege for such matters but the committee found Burns guilty of threatening to use parliamentary privilege to intimidate a member of the public for his family's gain. Following the findings of the committee and subsequent vote by MPs, he was suspended from Parliament on 11 May for a period of seven days.

On 23 August 2021, Johnson appointed Burns as the UK's trade envoy to Canada. On 16 September, Burns was appointed Minister of State for Northern Ireland during the second cabinet reshuffle of the second Johnson ministry.

On 25 January 2022, during the Westminster lockdown parties controversy, in an interview with Channel 4 News, Burns defended Johnson over an alleged surprise birthday get-together on 19 June 2020. Burns said that, rather than being a pre-planned party, Johnson was "ambushed with a cake". Burns' comments were ridiculed online in a series of memes.

Following the appointment of Liz Truss as Prime Minister, Burns was appointed to his former post of Minister of State for Trade Policy. He was dismissed from the position on 7 October, when he had the whip suspended following an allegation of misconduct at the 2022 Conservative Party Conference. He was also suspended as a patron of LGBT+ Conservatives. He was unable to vote in the October 2022 Conservative Party leadership election.

On 3 December 2022, he had the whip restored after being cleared of misconduct. The internal investigation had concluded with no further action. Burns commented he felt he had been targeted due to showing approval for Kemi Badenoch, a Conservative leadership rival to Liz Truss who was prime minister when Burns was dismissed. He said: "I think this all had become more to do with nice things I had said about the trade secretary than about being up late at the conference. It felt and smelt like a stitch-up and that is what it was."

In March 2023, Burns was called to testify at the inquiry into Partygate, a party held during the Covid-19 Lockdowns in London. Ahead of the inquiry, Burns made comments stating that the inquiry is not going to be fair from the outset. Burns' comments stated that the chair of the committee, Labour MP Harriet Harman, already stated that she already believes that Boris Johnson and Rishi Sunak are guilty and should admit their guilt via Twitter.

In the 2024 United Kingdom general election, he lost his seat to Jessica Toale from the Labour Party.

== Post-parliamentary career ==
Following his defeat at the 2024 general election, Burns has become a freelance consultant, specialising on advising clients on matters of international trade.

== Political views ==
=== Foreign affairs ===
Writing in 2008, Burns called for the international community to prepare a contingency plan for the governance of Zimbabwe after the eventual departure from office of Robert Mugabe.

He was outspoken in calling on former Home Secretary Jacqui Smith to grant asylum to young gay Iranian student Mehdi Kazemi. Also in 2008, Burns criticised the Ministry of Defence for its perceived failure to provide troops in Afghanistan with essential equipment, stating that many troops "would be alive today had they had the most basic of equipment".

=== European Union ===
A strong Eurosceptic, Burns was critical of the electoral system used to choose and rank Conservative candidates to run on lists to be Members of the European Parliament and the impact of UK Independence Party candidates in denying victory to Conservative candidates. In the 2017 election, UKIP opted not to place a candidate in his constituency due to his strong Eurosceptic stance.

=== Religious issues ===
Before voting for the Marriage (Same Sex Couples) Act 2013 he stated that he needed "cast iron guarantees" that religious organisations would not be forced into conducting same-sex marriages. Burns voted in favour of the bill at its second reading, but did not vote at its third and final reading.

== Personal life ==
Burns is gay. A practising Roman Catholic, he said in 2014 he feels unable to take communion since Bishop Philip Egan, of the diocese in which Burns resides, stated that those politicians who voted for same-sex marriage, even with the caveats upon which Burns had insisted (i.e. "guarantees that... churches would not ultimately be forced under human rights legislation to conduct such ceremonies"), should refrain from taking the sacrament.

Burns was a friend of Margaret Thatcher in the later years of her life and spoke in the House of Commons debate on 10 April 2013 following her death.

Burns is a keen snooker fan, and was previously chair of the All-Party Parliamentary snooker group.

== Honours ==
Burns was appointed a Knight Bachelor on 9 June 2023 as part of the 2022 Prime Minister's Resignation Honours.

Parliament of the United Kingdom
Preceded by John Butterfill	Member of Parliament for Bournemouth West; 2010–2024	Succeeded by Jessica Toale
Political offices
Preceded by George Hollingbery	Minister of State for Trade Policy; 2019–2020	Succeeded by Greg Hands
Preceded by Robin Walker	Minister of State for Northern Ireland; 2021–2022	Succeeded by Steve Baker
Preceded by Penny Mordaunt	Minister of State for Trade Policy; 2022	Succeeded by Greg Hands
