= Robert Gascoyne-Cecil, 5th Marquess of Salisbury =

British Conservative politician (1893–1972)

The Most Honourable The Marquess of Salisbury KG PC FRS DL
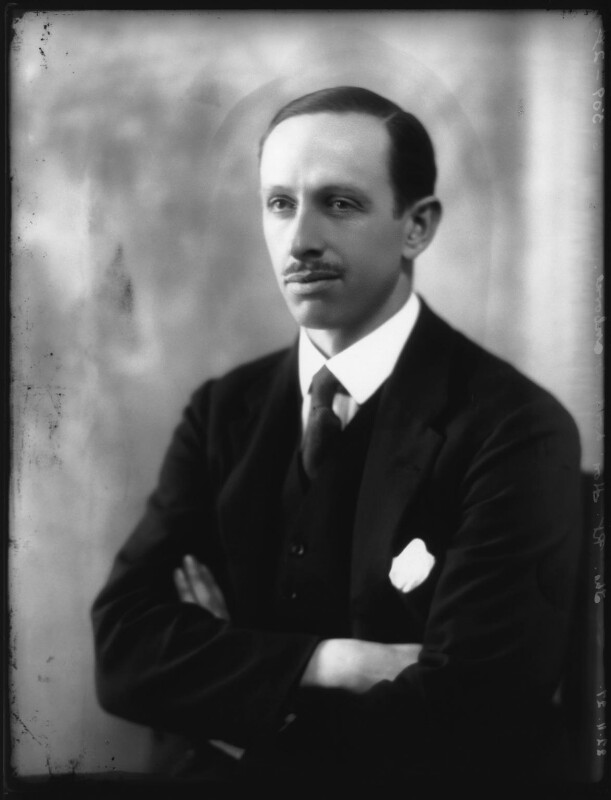
- The then-Viscount Cranborne in 1927
Ministerial offices
Leader of the House of Lords
In office 28 October 1951 – 29 March 1957
Monarchs	George VI; Elizabeth II
Prime Minister	Winston Churchill; Anthony Eden; Harold Macmillan
Preceded by	The Viscount Addison
Succeeded by	The Earl of Home
In office 21 February 1942 – 26 July 1945
Monarch	George VI
Prime Minister	Winston Churchill
Preceded by	The Lord Moyne
Succeeded by	The Viscount Addison
Lord President of the Council
In office 25 November 1952 – 29 March 1957
Monarch	Elizabeth II
Prime Minister	Winston Churchill; Anthony Eden
Preceded by	The Lord Woolton
Succeeded by	The Earl of Home
Secretary of State for Commonwealth Relations
In office 12 March 1952 – 24 November 1952
Monarch	Elizabeth II
Prime Minister	Winston Churchill
Preceded by	The Baron Ismay
Succeeded by	The Viscount Swinton
Secretary of State for the Colonies
In office 22 February 1942 – 22 November 1942
Monarch	George VI
Prime Minister	Winston Churchill
Preceded by	The Lord Moyne
Succeeded by	Oliver Stanley
Lord Keeper of the Privy Seal
In office 28 October 1951 – 7 May 1952
Monarch	George VI
Prime Minister	Winston Churchill
Preceded by	Richard Stokes
Succeeded by	Harry Crookshank
In office 22 November 1942 – 24 September 1943
Monarch	George VI
Prime Minister	Winston Churchill
Preceded by	Stafford Cripps
Succeeded by	The Lord Beaverbrook
Secretary of State for Dominion Affairs
In office 24 September 1943 – 26 July 1945
Monarch	George VI
Prime Minister	Winston Churchill
Preceded by	Clement Attlee
Succeeded by	The Viscount Addison
In office 3 October 1940 – 19 February 1942
Monarch	George VI
Prime Minister	Winston Churchill
Preceded by	The Viscount Caldecote
Succeeded by	Clement Attlee
Paymaster General
In office 15 May 1940 – 3 October 1940
Monarch	George VI
Prime Minister	Winston Churchill
Preceded by	The Earl Winterton
Succeeded by	Maurice Hankey
Parliamentary Under-Secretary of State for Foreign Affairs
In office 18 June 1935 – 20 February 1938
Monarchs	George V; Edward VIII; George VI
Prime Minister	Stanley Baldwin; Neville Chamberlain
Preceded by	The Earl Stanhope
Succeeded by	The Earl Plymouth

Member of the House of Lords Lord Temporal
- In office 4 April 1947 – 23 February 1972; Hereditary Peerage
- Preceded by: The 4th Marquess of Salisbury
- Succeeded by: The 6th Marquess of Salisbury
- In office 21 January 1941 – 4 April 1947 as Baron Cecil of Essendon
- Preceded by: James Gascoyne-Cecil (by writ of acceleration)
- Succeeded by: himself

Member of Parliament for South Dorset
- In office 30 May 1929 – 21 January 1941
- Preceded by: Robert Yerburgh
- Succeeded by: Victor Montagu

Personal details
- Born: 27 August 1893
- Died: 23 February 1972 (aged 78)
- Party: Conservative
- Spouse: Elizabeth Cavendish (m. 1915)
- Children: Robert Gascoyne-Cecil, 6th Marquess of Salisbury; Michael Charles James Cecil; Richard Hugh Cecil
- Parent: James Gascoyne-Cecil, 4th Marquess of Salisbury (father)
- Education: Christ Church, Oxford

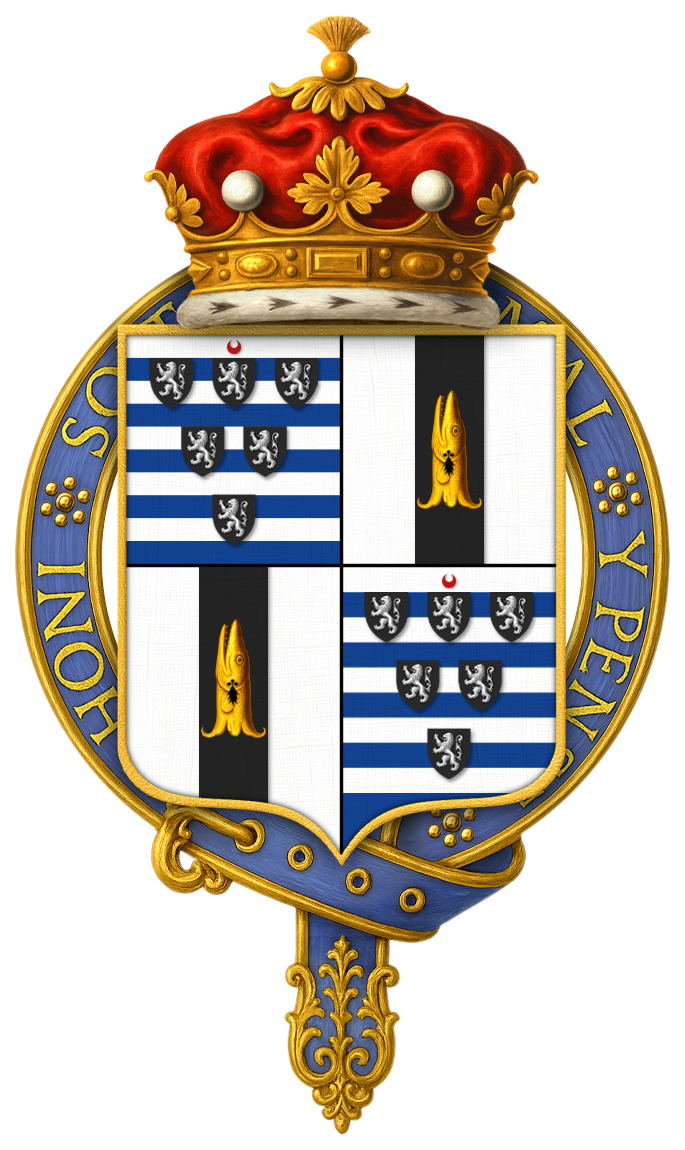
Garter-encircled shield of arms of Robert Gascoyne-Cecil, 5th Marquess of Salisbury, KG, PC, DL, FRS

Robert Arthur James Gascoyne-Cecil, 5th Marquess of Salisbury (27 August 1893 – 23 February 1972), known as Viscount Cranborne from 1903 to 1947, was a British Conservative politician.

== Background ==
Nicknamed "Bobbety", Salisbury was the eldest son of James Gascoyne-Cecil, 4th Marquess of Salisbury, by his wife Lady Cicely Gore, daughter of the 5th Earl of Arran, and the grandson of the 3rd Marquess of Salisbury, Prime Minister 1885-1886, 1886-1892 and 1895–1902. He was educated at Eton and Christ Church, Oxford, receiving an honorary Doctorate of Civil Laws in 1951.

== Military career ==
Salisbury served in the Army during the First World War. He was commissioned as a Lieutenant into the Grenadier Guards (SR) in 1915 and served until the war's end. He was awarded the Croix de Guerre and Chevalier Order of the Crown of Belgium. When the war ended, he worked at the Westminster Bank. In 1928, he was appointed a director and to the Royal Commission on Historical Manuscripts; he was promoted to chairman of the commission in 1957.

== Political career ==
Salisbury, as Viscount Cranborne, was elected as a Conservative to the House of Commons as MP for South Dorset in 1929. As Parliamentary Secretary to the Lord Privy Seal in 1934 in Ramsay MacDonald's National Government, he was promoted serving as Joint Parliamentary Under-Secretary of State for Foreign Affairs from 1935 to 1938. He was made Paymaster General by Winston Churchill in May 1940 for the duration of the Battle of Britain but was appointed Secretary of State for Dominion Affairs from 1940 to 1942.

In 1941, he was summoned to the House of Lords through a writ of acceleration in one of his father's titles as Baron Cecil of Essendon. He was Secretary of State for the Colonies in February–November 1942, Lord Privy Seal between 1942 and 1943, Leader of the House of Lords between 1942 and 1945 and again Secretary of State for Dominion Affairs between 1943 and 1945. As a friend of Churchill, in 1943, he was appointed President of the English-Speaking Union to promote the universality of the language throughout the British Empire. His final wartime appointment was as President of the University College of the South West for a statutory ten years before it was converted to university status.

In 1947, King George VI made Salisbury a Knight of the Order of the Garter, and he succeeded his father in the marquessate shortly afterwards. He became High Steward of Hertfordshire, where he lived, in 1947, shortly before the office was abolished.

During the 1950s, when his party returned to office, successively, he served Churchill, Anthony Eden, and Harold Macmillan as Lord Privy Seal from 1951 to 1952; Leader of the House of Lords from 1951 to 1957; Secretary of State for Commonwealth Relations in 1952 and Lord President of the Council from December 1952 to 1957. During the period of the coronation of Elizabeth II, he was appointed Acting Foreign Secretary, as Eden was then seriously ill after a series of botched operations on his bile duct.

In November 1951, he received an honorary doctorate of law from the University of Liverpool.

Lord Salisbury was known as a hardline imperialist. In 1952, as Secretary of State for Commonwealth Relations, he tried to make permanent the exile of Seretse Khama, kgosi (leader) of the Bamangwato people in Bechuanaland, for marrying a white British woman. During the 1960s, Lord Salisbury continued to be a staunch defender of the white-dominated governments in South Africa and in Southern Rhodesia (now Zimbabwe) and was granted the Freedom of the City of Salisbury (which had been named after his grandfather) on a visit in 1956. He was also a fierce opponent of liberal-left attempts to reform the House of Lords, but he created what is known as the Salisbury Convention, under which the House of Lords will not oppose the second or third reading of any government legislation promised in its election manifesto.

In January 1957, Eden resigned as prime minister. The two candidates were Rab Butler and Harold Macmillan. The Queen took advice from Winston Churchill (who backed Macmillan), Edward Heath (who, as Chief Whip, was aware of backbench opinion), and Salisbury, who interviewed the Cabinet one by one and with his famous speech impediment, asked each one whether he was for "Wab or Hawold" (it is thought that only between one and three were for "Wab"). To the surprise of the media, the advice was overwhelmingly to appoint Macmillan as Prime Minister instead of Butler.

Lord Salisbury resigned from his position as Leader of the House of Lords in opposition to the Government's decision to release Archbishop Makarios from his detention in Seychelles. Makarios, the Archbishop of Cyprus, had been arrested because the British perceived that he was encouraging inter-communal violence and terrorism in Cyprus during the so-called 'Cyprus Question'. He became the first president of the Conservative Monday Club in January 1962, when he stated "there was never a greater need for true conservatism than there is today". He held the post until his death in 1972.

Salisbury's cultural pursuits were recognised when he was made a Fellow of the Royal Academy of Arts that year. These artistic credentials were enhanced as a Trustee of the National Gallery from 1960 to 1966.

Apart from his political career, Salisbury was Chancellor of the University of Liverpool from 1951 until 1971. In 1970, students at the university staged an occupation at Senate House to demand his removal over his support for apartheid and other views.

== Marriage and children ==
Lord Salisbury married Elizabeth Vere Cavendish, daughter of Lord Richard Cavendish (grandson of the 7th Duke of Devonshire) and his wife Lady Moyra de Vere Beauclerk (a daughter of The 10th Duke of St Albans), on 8 December 1915. They had three sons, two of whom predeceased their parents:

- Robert Edward Peter Gascoyne-Cecil, 6th Marquess of Salisbury (born 24 October 1916, died 11 July 2003)
- Michael Charles James Gascoyne-Cecil (born 27 October 1918, died 27 October 1934)
- Richard Hugh Vere Gascoyne-Cecil (born 31 January 1924, a Sergeant Pilot in the RAF who was killed in action on 12 August 1944 during the Second World War.

Lord Salisbury died in February 1972, at 78, and was succeeded by his eldest and only surviving son, Robert, who became the 6th Marquess. Lady Salisbury died on 5 June 1982.

== Honours ==
- United Kingdom:
  - 3 December 1946: Knight of the Most Noble Order of the Garter (KG)

== Media portrayal ==
He is portrayed by Clive Francis in the Netflix series The Crown.

Parliament of the United Kingdom
Preceded by Robert Yerburgh	Member of Parliament for South Dorset; 1929–1941	Succeeded by Victor Montagu
Political offices
Preceded by The Earl Stanhope	Under-Secretary of State for Foreign Affairs; 1935–1938 with The Earl Stanhope 1935–1936; The Earl of Plymouth 1936–1938	Succeeded by The Earl of Plymouth; Rab Butler
Vacant Title last held by The Earl Winterton	Paymaster General; 1940	Vacant Title next held by The Lord Hankey
Preceded by The Viscount Caldecote	Secretary of State for Dominion Affairs; 1940–1942	Succeeded by Clement Attlee
Preceded by The Lord Moyne	Colonial Secretary; 1942	Succeeded by Oliver Stanley
Preceded by Hon. Sir Stafford Cripps	Lord Privy Seal; 1942–1943	Succeeded by The Lord Beaverbrook
Preceded by The Lord Moyne	Leader of the House of Lords; 1942–1945	Succeeded by The Viscount Addison
Preceded by Clement Attlee	Secretary of State for Dominion Affairs; 1943–1945	Succeeded by The Viscount Addison
Preceded by Richard Stokes	Lord Privy Seal; 1951–1952	Succeeded by Harry Crookshank
Preceded by The Viscount Addison	Leader of the House of Lords; 1951–1957	Succeeded by The Earl of Home
Preceded by The Lord Ismay	Secretary of State for Commonwealth Relations; 1952	Succeeded by The Viscount Swinton
Preceded by The Lord Woolton	Lord President of the Council; 1952–1957	Succeeded by The Earl of Home
Party political offices
Preceded by The Lord Moyne	Leader of the Conservative Party in the House of Lords; 1942–1957	Succeeded by The Earl of Home
Preceded by Club established	Chairman of the Monday Club; May 1961 – 1962	Succeeded by Paul Bristol
Honorary titles
Preceded by The Earl of Halifax	Chancellor of the Order of the Garter; 1960–1972	Succeeded by The Viscount Cobham
Peerage of Great Britain
Preceded by James Gascoyne-Cecil	Marquess of Salisbury; 1947–1972	Succeeded by Robert Gascoyne-Cecil
Peerage of England
Preceded by James Gascoyne-Cecil	Baron Cecil (by writ of acceleration); 1941–1972	Succeeded by Robert Gascoyne-Cecil
