= Bournemouth F.C. =

Association football club in England

Coordinates: 50°44′49″N 1°53′12″W

- Full name: Bournemouth Football Club
- Nickname: The Poppies
- Founded: 1875 (as Bournemouth Rovers)
- Ground: Victoria Park, Namu Road, Bournemouth
- Capacity: 3,000
- Chairman: Robert Corbin
- Manager: Lewis Rezzougui
- League: Wessex League Premier Division
- 2025–26: Wessex League Premier Division, 18th of 20
- Website: www.bournemouthfc.org.uk
| Home colours | Away colours |

Bournemouth Football Club (/ˈbɔːrnməθ/ BORN-məth) is an English football team currently playing in the Wessex League Premier Division, in the ninth tier of the English football league system. Their nickname is "The Poppies", and they are often known as Bournemouth Poppies to avoid confusion with the Premier League club AFC Bournemouth. The club plays at Victoria Park, Namu Road, in Bournemouth.

== History ==
The club was founded as Bournemouth Rovers on 11 September 1875 at a meeting held in Abbotts Auction Mart in Old Christchurch Road. In 1878 on Tuesday 26 November the club participated in one of the first floodlit matches, when they played under experimental electric lights at Dean Park for "a grand exhibition of the new electric light". In 1888 the club moved to Dean Park, and changed their name to Bournemouth Dean Park. The club changed its name again to Bournemouth F.C. in 1889 when the club amalgamated with local side Bournemouth Arabs, and moved grounds a season later to Victoria Park.

The club won the West Division in 1905 and repeated this again in 1910, this time playing at their new home of Namu Road. Namu Road was given to the club in 1908 by Mr. Jack Joy, a local landowner and former member of the club. A year later a grandstand was erected and formally opened by the Mayor. The Poppies had more success in the early years becoming County Division Champions either side of the Great War in 1914 and 1922. However, in 1929 the club was relegated into the newly formed Division Two, but were promoted back to Division One as champions in 1932. After the war, the club entered the FA Cup for the first time in the 1946–47 season.

The club at the end of the 1978–79 season were promoted back to Division one of the Hampshire League but could only last a season in the top division. This relegation was followed two seasons later by a further relegation putting the club back into Division Three. They would remain in this division until joining the newly formed Wessex League in 1985. The club two seasons later made its Debut in the FA Vase losing to Bridport in the Extra Preliminary round in the 1987–88 season. The club has since remained in this division with its best performance being in the 1994–95 season when under manager Alex Pike, they finished as runners-up to Fleet Town.

In the 2010–11 campaign the club won the League Cup, winning the final 1–0 against Winchester City.

== Club officials ==
| Position | Name |
|---|---|
| First Team Manager | (England) Lewis Rezzougui |
| First Team Assistant Manager | (England) Martin Leamon |
| First Team Coach | (Scotland) Vacant |
| Media Manager | (Scotland) John McKay |
| Commercial Manager | (England) John McKay (Temporary) |
| Goalkeeping Coach | (England) Vacant |
| Kit Man | (England) Colin Brown |
| Media Team (Photography) | (England) Cameron Gale / (England) Matt Gale |
| Media Team (Stadium Announcer) | (England) Tom Ellerby |
| Media Team (Matchday Audio Commentary) | (England) Ben Thomas |
| Media Team (Matchday Audio Commentary) | (England) Ben Thomas |
| Media Team (Matchday Journalist) | (England) Chas Chandler |
| Media Team (Matchday Journalist & Live Updates) | (Scotland) Pierce Menzies |
| Media Team (Graphics Assistant) | (Scotland) Gianna Gonzalez Watterston |
| Media Team (Video Content) | (Nigeria) Jonah Enenehi |

== Ground ==
Bournemouth play their games at Victoria Park, Namu Road, Winton, Bournemouth. The ground was sold to Bournemouth Council after the Second World War for £4,500; they now lease it to the club on a peppercorn rent. The clubhouse was opened in 1985. The ground features a 205-seater stand and several rows of bench seating replacing the stand that was destroyed by fire in 1974. The remaining three sides are flat standing separated from the playing area by a permanent metal barrier.

== Honours ==
- Wessex League Premier Division
  - Runners-up: 1994–95
- Hampshire League Second Division
  - Runners-up: 1978–79
- Wessex League Cup
  - Winners: 2010–11
  - Runners-up: 2006–07
- Hampshire League Shield
  - 'Winners: 1913–14
- Hampshire Intermediate Cup
  - Winners: 1949–50, 1969–70, 1971–72
- Russell-Cotes Cup
  - Runners-up: 1995–96, 2001–02

== Records ==
- Highest League Position: 2nd in Wessex premier Division 1994–95
- FA Cup best performance: second qualifying round 1949–50, 1990–91, 2011–12
- FA Vase best performance: Quarter-finals 2011–12
- Biggest win: 14–1 versus Tadley Calleva on 5 October 2010
