= John Eden, Baron Eden of Winton =

British politician (1925–2020)

The Right Honourable The Lord Eden of Winton Bt PC MP
- Sir John Eden, Bt, in 1969

Minister of Posts and Telecommunications
- In office 7 April 1972 – 8 March 1974
- Prime Minister: Edward Heath
- Preceded by: Christopher Chataway
- Succeeded by: Office abolished

Minister of State for Industry
- In office 15 October 1970 – 6 April 1972
- Prime Minister: Edward Heath
- Preceded by: Office established
- Succeeded by: Tom Boardman

Minister of State for Technology
- In office 23 June 1970 – 15 October 1970
- Prime Minister: Edward Heath
- Preceded by: Eric Varley
- Succeeded by: Office abolished

Member of the House of Lords
- Lord Temporal
- Life peerage 3 October 1983 – 11 June 2015

Member of Parliament for Bournemouth West
- In office 18 February 1954 – 13 May 1983
- Preceded by: Robert Gascoyne-Cecil
- Succeeded by: John Butterfill

Personal details
- Born: John Benedict Eden; 15 September 1925 England
- Died: 23 May 2020 (aged 94)
- Party: Conservative
- Spouses: Belinda Jane Pascoe (m. 1954; div. 1974) Margaret Ann Gordon (m. 1977)
- Children: 4
- Education: Eton College; St. Paul's School

John Benedict Eden, Baron Eden of Winton, PC, MP (15 September 1925 – 23 May 2020), known as Sir John Eden, 9th Baronet, from 1963 to 1983, was a British Conservative Party politician who served as Member of Parliament for Bournemouth West from 1954 to 1983.

== Background ==
Eden was the son of Sir Timothy Eden, 8th Baronet and Edith Mary Prendergast. He was educated at Eton College and St Paul's School, New Hampshire, in the US. He served as a Lieutenant with the Rifle Brigade, 2nd Gurkha Rifles and the Gilgit Scouts during the Second World War. He was a nephew of Sir Anthony Eden (1897–1977), who served as prime minister from 1955 to 1957, and he succeeded his father Sir Timothy Calvert Eden to his baronetcies in 1963. He was the 9th Baronet of West Auckland and the 7th Baronet of Maryland.

== Career ==
After unsuccessfully contesting the 1953 Paddington North by-election, Eden was first elected as a Conservative Member of Parliament (MP) for Bournemouth West at the 1954 Bournemouth West by-election, which he would continue to represent from 1954 until 1983. When first elected, he was the Baby of the House, the youngest member of the House of Commons. He was appointed to the Privy Council on 10 April 1972 and was created a life peer as Baron Eden of Winton, of Rushyford in the County of Durham on 3 October 1983, following his retirement from the House of Commons. He retired from the House of Lords on 11 June 2015 under the provisions of the House of Lords Reform Act 2014. Following the death of Lord Healey on 3 October 2015, Eden became the oldest surviving former MP with the earliest date of first election.

Appointments:

- Member of the House of Commons Estimates committee (1960–1964)
- Delegate to Council of Europe and West European Union (1960–1962)
- Delegate to NATO Technology (June–October 1970)
- Minister of State for Industry (1970–1972)
- Minister of Posts and Telecommunications (1972–1974)
- Member of the House of Commons Expenditure committee (1974–1976)
- Chairman of the Select Committee on EEC Legislation (1976–1979)
- Chairman of the Select Committee on Home Affairs (1980–1983)
- Chairman of the British Lebanese Association (1990–1998)
- Chairman of the Royal Armouries Association (1986–1994)
- Member of Timken Company International Advisory Board
- Chairman of Lady Eden's Schools Ltd

== Family life ==
Eden was twice married:

- 1) Belinda Jane Pascoe (1954 – divorced 1974); four children
  - The Honourable Emily Rose Eden (born 1959)
  - The Honourable Arabella Charlotte Eden (born 1960)
  - The Honourable Sir Robert Frederick Calvert Eden (born 30 April 1964). The 10th Baronet of West Auckland and 8th Baronet of Maryland.
  - The Honourable John "Jack" Edward Morton Eden (born 1966). Heir presumptive to the baronetcies.
- 2) Margaret Ann Gordon (1977 – his death 2020). A former wife of the Earl of Perth.

== Arms ==
Coat of arms of John Eden, Baron Eden of Winton
Coronet A Coronet of a Baron Crest A dexter Arm embowed in Armour couped at the shoulder proper and grasping a Garb fesswise as in the Arms banded Vert Escutcheon Gules on a Chevron Argent between three Garbs Or banded Vert as many Escallops Sable Supporters On either side a Lion rampant guardant Gules about the mane of each a Chain pendant therefrom a Portcullis Or that on the dexter side holding by the interior paw a Cross Patonce also Or and that on the sinister side holding by the interior paw a Rose Branch proper having three Double Roses Argent and Gules barbed and seeded proper, the Compartment comprising a Mount rising in the centre and growing therefrom Fir Trees and Beech Trees in the foreground a Bay with Cliffs proper and a Rivulet wavy Azure running across a Sandy Beach also proper into the Sea barry wavy of four Azure and Argent Motto Si Sit Prudentia ("If there be but prudence")

Parliament of the United Kingdom
Preceded by Viscount Cranborne	Member of Parliament for Bournemouth West; 1954–1983	Succeeded by John Butterfill
Preceded by Tony Benn	Baby of the House; 1954	Succeeded by John Woollam
Baronetage of England
Preceded by Timothy Eden	Baronet (of West Auckland); 1963–2020	Succeeded by Robert Eden
Baronetage of Great Britain
Preceded by Timothy Eden	Baronet (of Maryland); 1963–2020	Succeeded by Robert Eden
