= Slades Farm =

Area of Bournemouth, England

Coordinates: 50°44.9′N 1°53.8′W

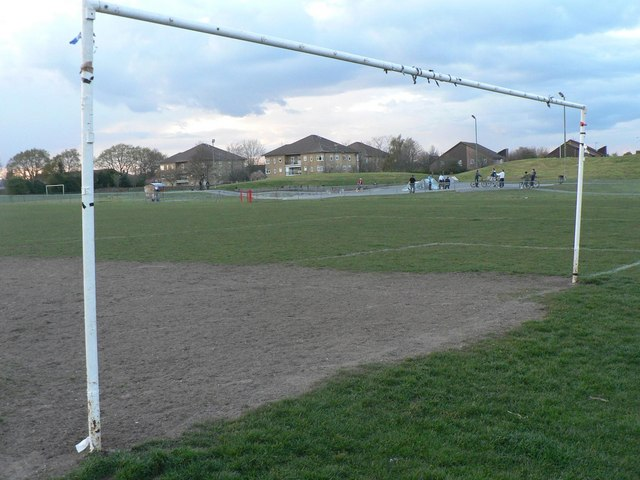
Recreation ground in Slades Farm.

Slades Farm is an area of Ensbury Park, Bournemouth, Dorset, England.

== History ==
A renewed spate of housebuilding took place in the 1970s when Bournemouth Borough Council purchased Slade's Farm, south of Columbia Road, following an increased demand for low-cost housing in the borough. This was one of the last areas of agricultural land within the Bournemouth boundary. The farm dated back to about 1850 and was originally known as Talbot Farm, taking its name from Talbot Village, the model settlement further east; Slade was a later tenant. There had been some modernisation of the farm over the years - in 1945 the trustees of the Talbot estate, who owned the freehold, applied for planning permission for a 'milk cooling shed' there - but by the 1960s the entire site had fallen out of use.

When Bournemouth Council eventually purchased the land, proposals were drawn up for around 400 new dwellings ranging from bedsits for the elderly to three-bedroomed houses, the nucleus of which would be the newly-cut Slade's Farm Road. An additional development around this time was Slade's Farm Secondary School, catering for children with special educational needs: this opened in September 1975.

As for Slade's Farmhouse, this was given Grade II listed status when the above-mentioned developments began, but having failed to find a use for the building - and in view of its condition, after many years of non-occupation - the council applied to the Department of the Environment to have it demolished in November 1975. Demolition followed two years later, along with further development of the Columbia Road frontage. Some idea of the property may be had from the neighbouring Lollipop Farm House, also listed, which survives in Columbia Road as a result of a comprehensive repair programme in the 1980s, where the original materials of the property were put to fresh use.

== Amenities ==
In 1978, the skate park became one of the first to be purpose built in the United Kingdom.

In 2010, a 250m Olympic size community cycle track was constructed in the community.

== Politics ==
Slades Farm is part of the Bournemouth West constituency.
