= Henry Brinton =

British political activist and astronomer

Henry Brinton (27 July 1901 – 1 June 1977) was a British political activist and astronomer.

Born in Wolverhampton, Brinton joined the Labour Party and the League of Nations Union. He travelled to Republican Spain as part of an Anglican delegation during the Spanish Civil War, and then with Wilfred Roberts organised a reception camp for Basque child refugees.

Brinton stood unsuccessfully for the Labour Party in Great Grimsby at the 1935 United Kingdom general election, St Ives at the 1945 United Kingdom general election, Truro at the 1950 United Kingdom general election, Scarborough and Whitby at the 1951 United Kingdom general election, and also in the 1954 Bournemouth West by-election. Unable to get selected for a winnable seat, he then decided to focus on his interests in writing and astronomy.

Brinton moved to Selsey in 1957, joining the British Astronomical Association, and writing books on astronomy which became known for their photography. These included Astronomy for Beginners, and Measuring the Universe. He wrote a series of "Discovering..." science books for schools. He also wrote thrillers, both under his own name and as "Alex Fraser", his work including the 1962 novel Purple-6.

In 1975, Briton suffered a stroke, and had to give up astronomy, though he continued work as a member of the West Sussex County Council. He presented his telescope to Hatfield Polytechnic. He died two years later. "The Brinton Telescope" was mounted in Bayfordbury Observatory, then moved to Slindon College, finally being restored at Chichester Planetarium by Dr John Mason.
