= Bournemouth West =

Parliamentary constituency in the United Kingdom, 1950 onwards

Coordinates: 50.717°N 1.913°W

- Borough constituency for the House of Commons
- Boundary of Bournemouth West in South West England
- County: Dorset
- Population: 98,968 (2011 census)
- Electorate: 72,094 (2023)

Current constituency
- Created: 1950
- Member of Parliament: Jessica Toale (Labour)
- Seats: One
- Created from: Bournemouth

Bournemouth West is a parliamentary constituency (Note: A borough constituency (for the purposes of election expenses and type of returning officer)) in Dorset represented in the House of Commons of the UK Parliament since 2024 by Jessica Toale, a member of the Labour Party.

== Constituency profile ==
The constituency covers the town centre and western portion of Bournemouth, including the areas of Kinson, Ensbury Park, Alder Hills, Winton and Talbot Woods. Bournemouth is a large seaside resort town on the south coast of England. The town is located in Dorset but was traditionally in Hampshire. Bournemouth is a popular tourist destination; in 2011, 15% of the town's population were employed in the tourism sector and the seafront received 4.5 million visitors.

Residents of the constituency are younger and slightly less wealthy than neighbouring Bournemouth East and national averages. Levels of education, employment and ethnic diversity are similar to the country as a whole. At the most recent local council election in 2023, voters in the constituency elected primarily Conservative and Liberal Democrat councillors, with Liberal Democrats winning in the more affluent areas around Talbot Woods. Most voters in the constituency favoured leaving the European Union in the 2016 referendum, with an estimated 59% voting for Brexit.

== History ==
The constituency contains Labour's best ward in Bournemouth in the district of Kinson but, until 2024, the seat had elected Conservatives at every election since its creation in 1950 and was therefore considered to be a Conservative safe seat. However, it was won for the first time by Labour at the 2024 general election.

== Boundaries ==
Bournemouth West 1974–1983 in Hampshire

Map of boundaries from 2024

With the exception of the period 1983–1997 (when it was in Bournemouth East), Bournemouth Town Centre has been in this constituency since its creation in 1950.

1950–1974: The County Borough of Bournemouth wards of Central, East Cliff, Kinson, Moordown North, Moordown South, Redhill Park, Westbourne, West Cliff, and Winton.

1974–1983: The County Borough of Bournemouth wards of Central, East Cliff, Kinson North, Kinson South, Redhill Park, Westbourne, West Cliff, and Winton.

1983–1997: The Borough of Bournemouth wards of Ensbury Park, Kinson, Redhill Park, Talbot Woods, Wallisdown, Westbourne, West Cliff, and Winton, and the Borough of Poole wards of Alderney, Bourne Valley, and Canford Magna.

1997–2010: The Borough of Bournemouth wards of Central, East Cliff, Ensbury Park, Kinson, Redhill Park, Talbot Woods, Wallisdown, Westbourne, West Cliff, and Winton.

2010–2024: The Borough of Bournemouth wards of Central, Kinson North, Kinson South, Redhill and Northbourne, Talbot and Branksome Woods, Wallisdown and Winton West, Westbourne and West Cliff, and Winton East, and the Borough of Poole wards of Alderney and Branksome East.

For the 2010 general election, the constituency gained the Branksome area from Poole whilst losing East Cliff to the neighbouring Bournemouth East constituency.

2024–present: The District of Bournemouth, Christchurch and Poole wards of Alderney & Bourne Valley; Bournemouth Central; Kinson; Redhill & Northbourne; Talbot & Branksome Woods; Wallisdown & Winton West; Westbourne & West Cliff; and Winton East.

Minor changes following re-organisation of local authorities and wards in Dorset.

== Members of Parliament ==
Election	Member	Party
1950	Robert Gascoyne-Cecil	Conservative
1954 by-election	John Eden	Conservative
1983	John Butterfill	Conservative
2010	Conor Burns	Conservative
2024	Jessica Toale	Labour

== Elections ==
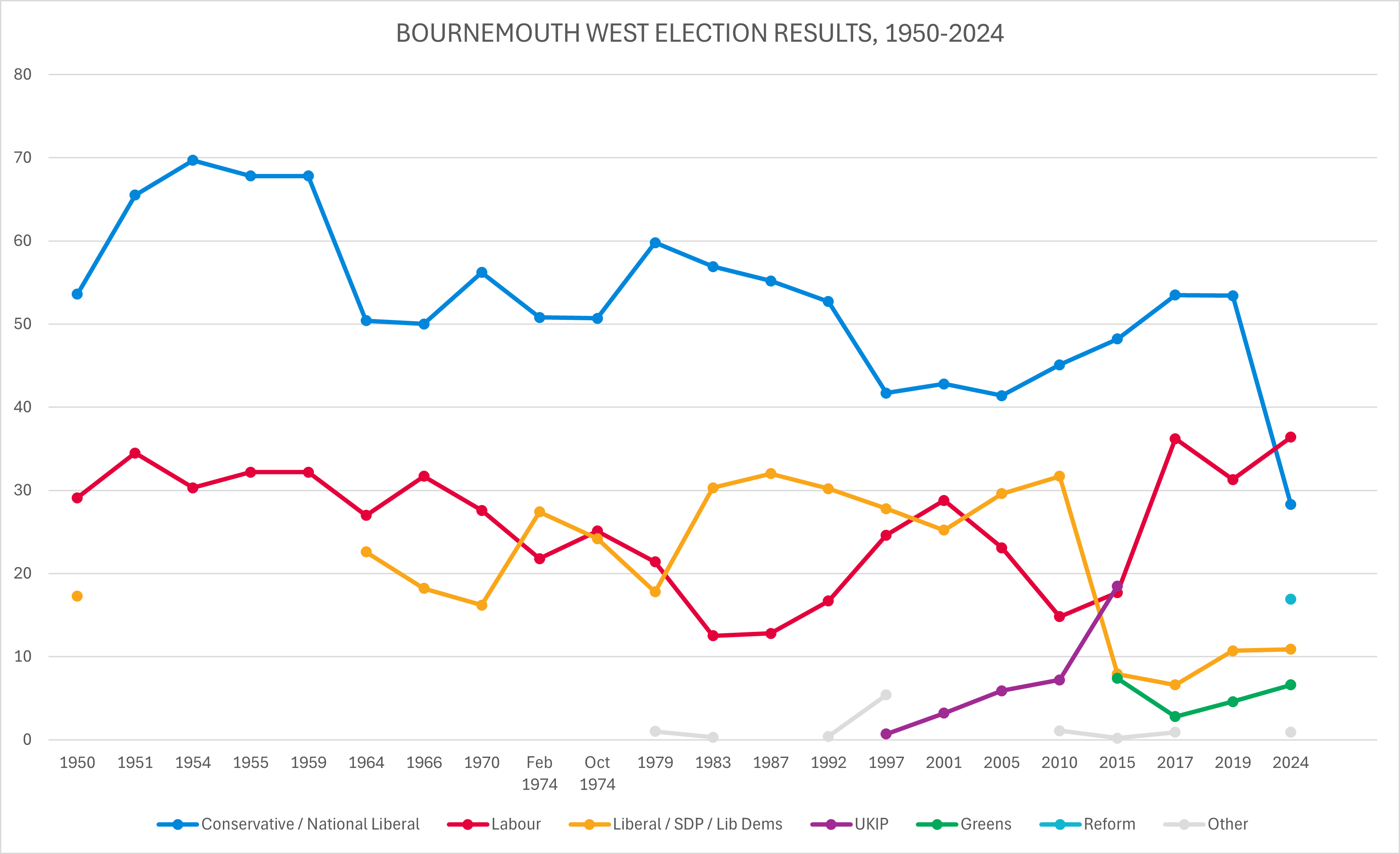
Election results 1950-2024

=== Elections in the 2020s ===
General election 2024: Bournemouth West
Party	Candidate	Votes	%	±%
Labour	Jessica Toale	14,365	36.4	+4.6
Conservative	Conor Burns	11,141	28.3	−25.3
Reform	Ben Aston	6,647	16.9	N/A
Liberal Democrats	Jeff Hanna	4,311	10.9	+0.8
Green	Darren Jones	2,614	6.6	+2.1
CPA	Julie Vivienne	201	0.5	N/A
SDP	David Warden	139	0.4	N/A
Majority		3,224	8.1	N/A
Turnout		39,418	56.1	−7.4
Registered electors		70,259		
Labour gain from Conservative		Swing	+14.9	

=== Elections in the 2010s ===
2019 notional result
Party	Vote	%
Conservative	24,512	53.6
Labour	14,571	31.8
Liberal Democrats	4,603	10.1
Green	2,066	4.5
Turnout	45,752	63.5
Electorate	72,094	

General election 2019: Bournemouth West
Party	Candidate	Votes	%	±%
Conservative	Conor Burns	24,550	53.4	–0.1
Labour	David Stokes	14,400	31.3	–4.9
Liberal Democrats	Jon Nicholas	4,931	10.7	+4.1
Green	Simon Bull	2,096	4.6	+1.8
Majority		10,150	22.1	+4.8
Turnout		45,977	62.0	+1.2
Conservative hold		Swing	+2.4	

General election 2017: Bournemouth West
Party	Candidate	Votes	%	±%
Conservative	Conor Burns	23,812	53.5	+5.3
Labour	David Stokes	16,101	36.2	+18.5
Liberal Democrats	Phil Dunn	2,929	6.6	–1.3
Green	Simon Bull	1,247	2.8	–4.6
Pirate	Jason Halsey	418	0.9	N/A
Majority		7,711	17.3	–12.4
Turnout		44,507	60.8	+2.8
Conservative hold		Swing	–6.6	

General election 2015: Bournemouth West
Party	Candidate	Votes	%	±%
Conservative	Conor Burns	20,155	48.2	+3.1
UKIP	Martin Houlden	7,745	18.5	+11.3
Labour	David Stokes	7,386	17.7	+2.9
Liberal Democrats	Mike Plummer	3,281	7.9	–23.8
Green	Elizabeth McManus	3,107	7.4	N/A
Patria	Dick Franklin	99	0.2	N/A
Majority		12,410	29.7	+16.3
Turnout		41,767	58.0	–0.1
Conservative hold		Swing		

General election 2010: Bournemouth West
Party	Candidate	Votes	%	±%
Conservative	Conor Burns	18,808	45.1	+5.6
Liberal Democrats	Alasdair Murray	13,225	31.7	−0.2
Labour	Sharon Carr-Brown	6,171	14.8	−8.1
UKIP	Philip Glover	2,999	7.2	+1.6
Independent	Harvey Taylor	456	1.1	N/A
Majority		5,583	13.4	+1.5
Turnout		41,659	58.1	+4.2
Conservative hold		Swing	+2.9	

=== Elections in the 2000s ===
General election 2005: Bournemouth West
Party	Candidate	Votes	%	±%
Conservative	John Butterfill	14,057	41.4	−1.4
Liberal Democrats	Richard Renaut	10,026	29.6	+4.4
Labour	Dafydd Williams	7,824	23.1	−5.7
UKIP	Michael Maclaire-Hillier	2,017	5.9	+2.7
Majority		4,031	11.8	−2.2
Turnout		33,924	53.3	+0.1
Conservative hold		Swing	-2.9	

General election 2001: Bournemouth West
Party	Candidate	Votes	%	±%
Conservative	John Butterfill	14,417	42.8	+1.1
Labour	David Stokes	9,699	28.8	+4.2
Liberal Democrats	Fiona Hornby	8,468	25.2	−2.6
UKIP	Cynthia Blake	1,064	3.2	+2.5
Majority		4,718	14.0	+0.1
Turnout		33,648	53.2	−13.0
Conservative hold		Swing		

=== Elections in the 1990s ===
General election 1997: Bournemouth West
Party	Candidate	Votes	%	±%
Conservative	John Butterfill	17,115	41.7	
Liberal Democrats	Janet Dover	11,405	27.8	
Labour	Dennis Gritt	10,093	24.6	
Referendum	Ronald Mills	1,910	4.7	N/A
UKIP	Linda Tooley	281	0.7	N/A
BNP	John Morse	165	0.4	N/A
Natural Law	Alexander Springham	103	0.3	
Majority		5,710	13.9	
Turnout		41,072	66.21	
Conservative hold		Swing	-5.6	

General election 1992: Bournemouth West
Party	Candidate	Votes	%	±%
Conservative	John Butterfill	29,820	52.7	−2.5
Liberal Democrats	Janet Dover	17,117	30.2	−1.8
Labour	Ben Grower	9,423	16.7	+3.9
Natural Law	Alexander Springham	232	0.4	N/A
Majority		12,703	22.5	−0.7
Turnout		56,592	75.7	+2.4
Conservative hold		Swing	−0.4	

=== Elections in the 1980s ===
General election 1987: Bournemouth West
Party	Candidate	Votes	%	±%
Conservative	John Butterfill	30,117	55.2	−1.7
SDP	Peter Craven	17,466	32.0	+1.7
Labour	Ronald Jones	7,018	12.8	+0.3
Majority		12,651	23.2	−3.4
Turnout		54,601	73.4	−4.2
Conservative hold		Swing	-1.7	

General election 1983: Bournemouth West
Party	Candidate	Votes	%	±%
Conservative	John Butterfill	28,466	56.9	
Liberal	Michael James	15,135	30.3	
Labour	Kelvin Horrocks	6,243	12.5	
BNP	John Morse	180	0.3	N/A
Majority		13,331	26.6	
Turnout		50,024	69.2	
Conservative hold		Swing		

=== Elections in the 1970s ===
General election 1979: Bournemouth West
Party	Candidate	Votes	%	±%
Conservative	John Eden	25,873	59.84	
Labour	Peter J. Brushett	9,247	21.39	
Liberal	Terence D. G. Richards	7,677	17.76	
National Front	G Hubbard	438	1.01	N/A
Majority		16,626	38.45	
Turnout		43,235	70.46	
Conservative hold		Swing		

General election October 1974: Bournemouth West
Party	Candidate	Votes	%	±%
Conservative	John Eden	21,294	50.67	
Labour	Lionel F Bennett	10,566	25.14	
Liberal	Terence D. G. Richards	10,166	24.19	
Majority		10,728	25.53	
Turnout		42,026	68.66	
Conservative hold		Swing		

General election February 1974: Bournemouth West
Party	Candidate	Votes	%	±%
Conservative	John Eden	23,473	50.82	
Liberal	Terence D. G. Richards	12,655	27.40	
Labour	Lionel F Bennett	10,062	21.78	
Majority		10,818	23.42	
Turnout		46,190	76.06	
Conservative hold		Swing		

General election 1970: Bournemouth West
Party	Candidate	Votes	%	±%
Conservative	John Eden	28,714	56.17	
Labour	Lionel F Bennett	14,099	27.58	
Liberal	John Fuller Mills	8,303	16.24	
Majority		13,615	28.59	
Turnout		51,116	69.28	
Conservative hold		Swing		

=== Elections in the 1960s ===
General election 1966: Bournemouth West
Party	Candidate	Votes	%	±%
Conservative	John Eden	25,740	50.02	
Labour	Lionel F Bennett	16,334	31.74	
Liberal	John F Mills	9,389	18.24	
Majority		9,406	18.28	
Turnout		51,463	73.37	
Conservative hold		Swing		

General election 1964: Bournemouth West
Party	Candidate	Votes	%	±%
Conservative	John Eden	26,114	50.44	
Labour	George W Spicer	13,975	26.99	
Liberal	John F Mills	11,681	22.56	N/A
Majority		12,139	23.45	
Turnout		51,770	73.71	
Conservative hold		Swing		

=== Elections in the 1950s ===
General election 1959: Bournemouth West
Party	Candidate	Votes	%	±%
Conservative	John Eden	33,575	67.78	
Labour	George W Spicer	15,957	32.22	
Majority		17,618	35.56	
Turnout		49,532	72.62	
Conservative hold		Swing		

General election 1955: Bournemouth West
Party	Candidate	Votes	%	±%
Conservative	John Eden	31,931	67.83	
Labour	Charles Ford	15,147	32.17	
Majority		16,784	35.66	
Turnout		47,078	71.71	
Conservative hold		Swing		

Bournemouth West by-election, 1954
Party	Candidate	Votes	%	±%
Conservative	John Eden	20,695	69.68	+4.19
Labour	Henry Brinton	9,006	30.32	−4.19
Majority		11,689	39.36	+8.38
Turnout		29,701		
Conservative hold		Swing		

General election 1951: Bournemouth West
Party	Candidate	Votes	%	±%
Conservative	Robert Gascoyne-Cecil	33,269	65.49	
Labour	Judith Hart	17,532	34.51	
Majority		15,737	30.98	
Turnout		50,801	77.71	
Conservative hold		Swing		

General election 1950: Bournemouth West
Party	Candidate	Votes	%	±%
Conservative	Robert Gascoyne-Cecil	28,548	53.62	
Labour	WA Boddy	15,476	29.07	
Liberal	John Creasey	9,216	17.31	
Majority		13,072	23.55	
Turnout		53,240	83.95	
Conservative win (new seat)				

== See also ==
- List of parliamentary constituencies in Dorset
