= St Mark's Church, Bournemouth =

Church in Dorset, England

St Mark's Church
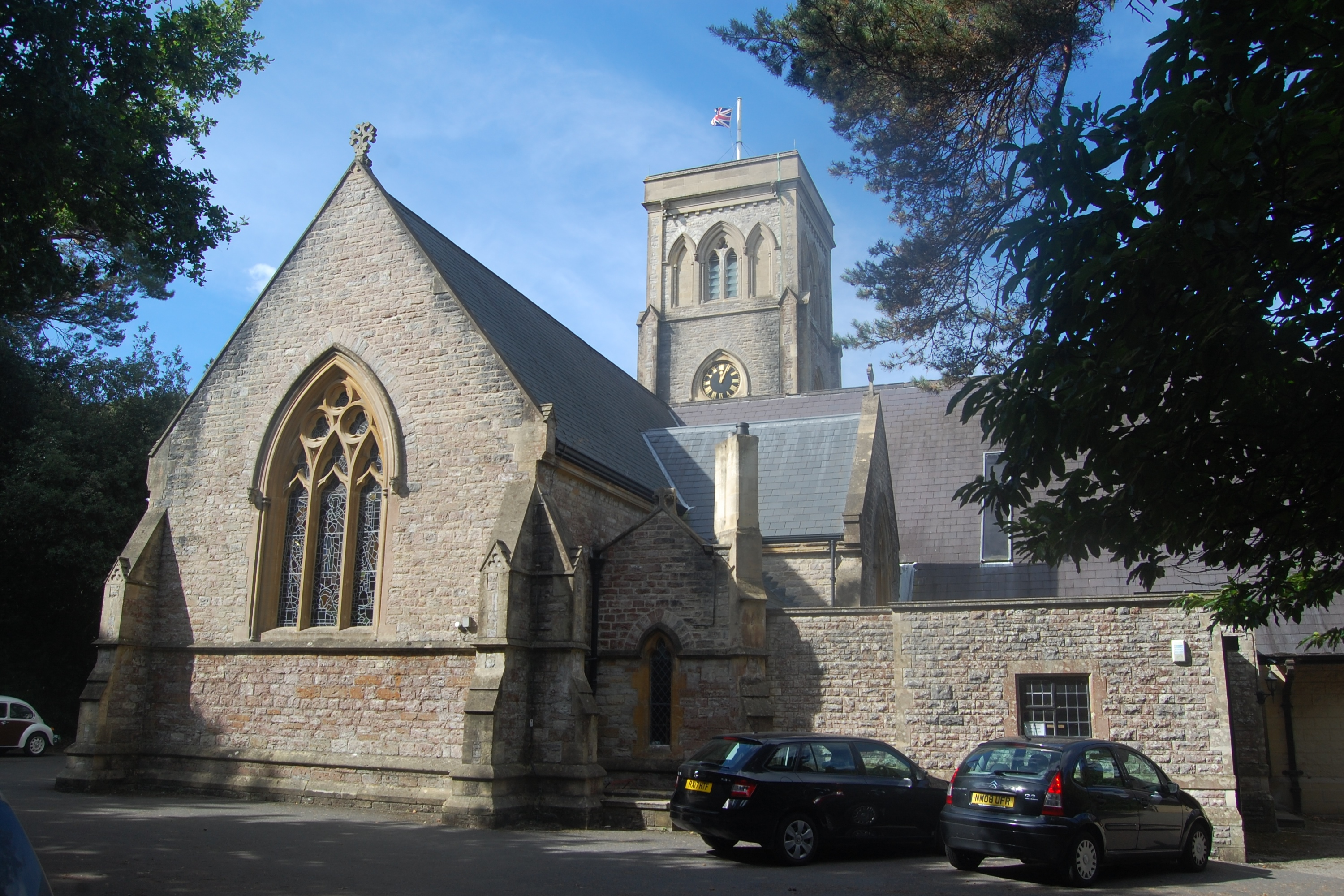
- St Mark's Church in 2022

Religion
- Affiliation: Anglicanism
- Ecclesiastical or organizational status: active
- Ownership: Church of England
- Year consecrated: 1870

Location
- Location: Wallisdown Road, Talbot Village, Bournemouth, Dorset, England
- Interactive map of St Mark's Church
- Coordinates: 50.7457°N 1.9025°W

Architecture
- Architects: George Evans & W.J. Fletcher
- Type: Church
- Style: Gothic Revival architecture
- Completed: 1868-1870
- Materials: Purbeck stone, blue slate

St Mark's Church is a Victorian Church of England parish church and listed building in Bournemouth, England.

== History ==
The church was built and consecrated in 1870 as part of Talbot Village. The church became a Grade II listed building in 1972.

The church was expanded in 1991. In March 2007, a car was set on fire next to the church. The fire spread to the roof of the old church which was destroyed.

== Gallery ==
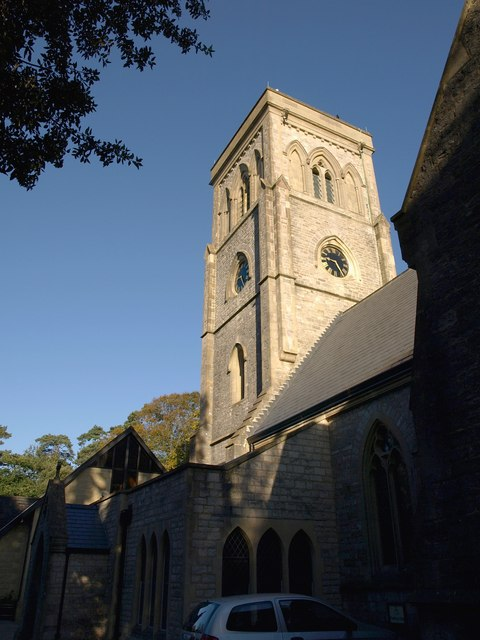
The West tower of church, Talbot Village.

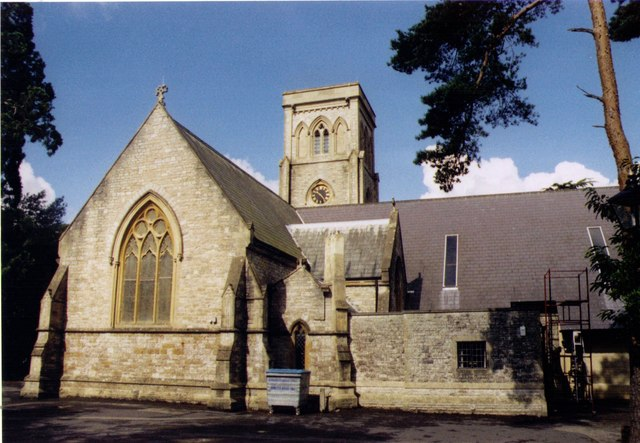
The church as seen from the east.

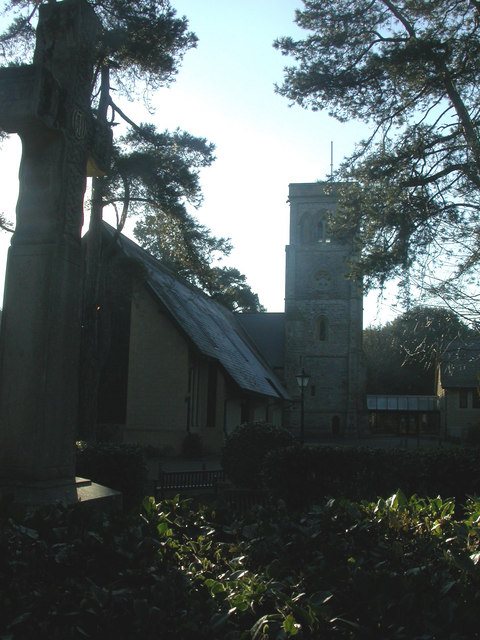
The church as seen from the north.

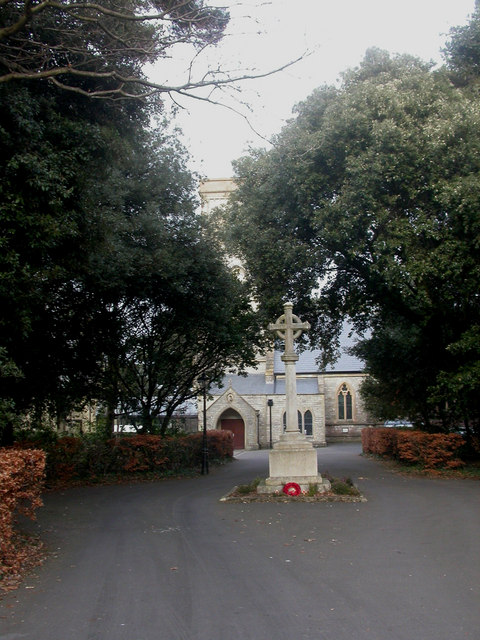
The parish war memorial in front of the church.

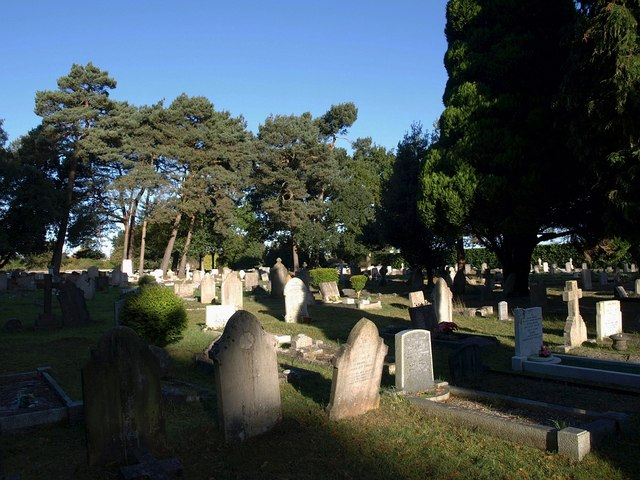
The Victorian section of the graveyard.

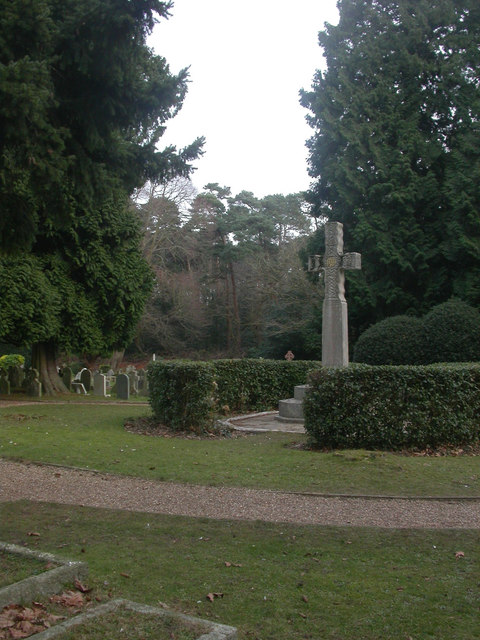
Churchyard cross.

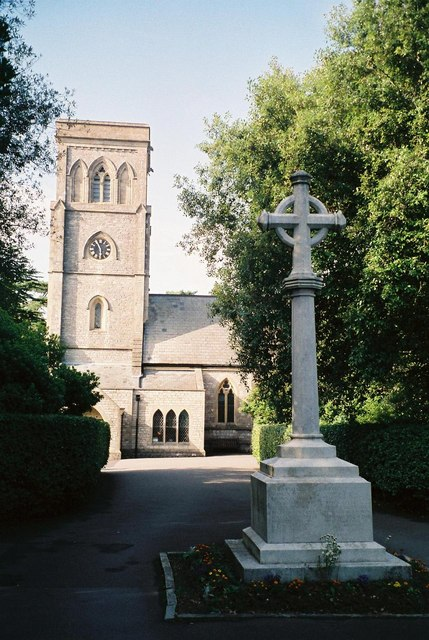
The parish war memorial in front of the tower of St Mark's church in the background, pictured in 1998

== See also ==
- List of churches in Bournemouth
