= Talbot Village =

Village in Dorset, United Kingdom

Coordinates: 50.747°N 1.897°W

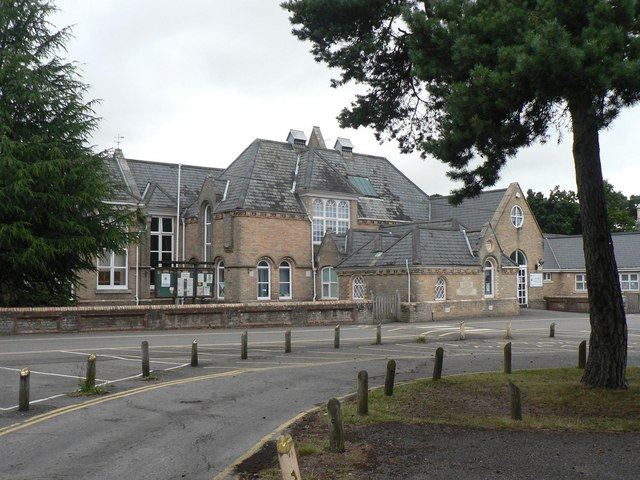
St Mark's Church of England Primary School

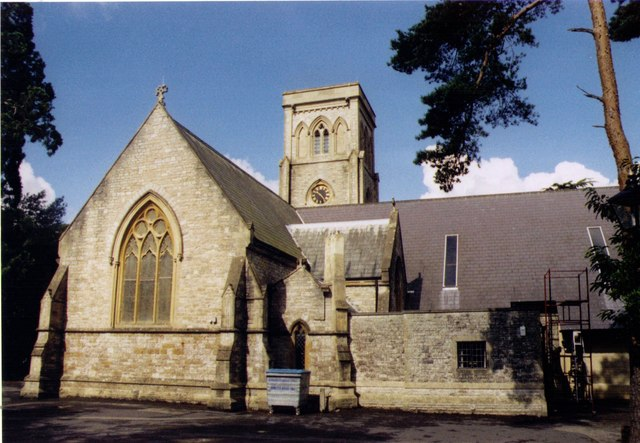
St Mark's Church, Bournemouth

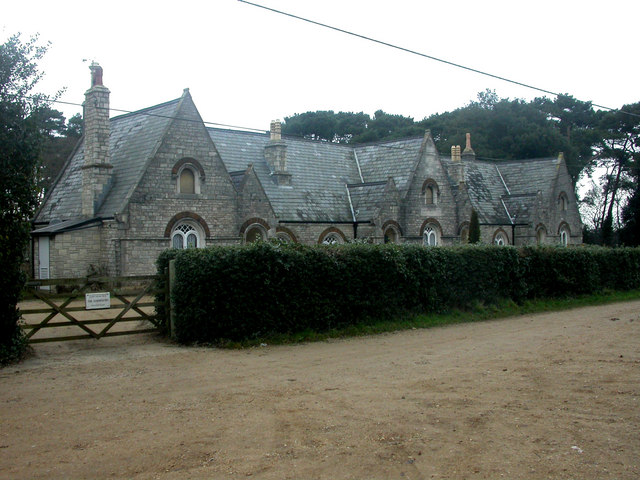
Almshouses

Talbot Village is a neighbourhood on the boundary of Bournemouth and Poole in Dorset, England. It was built as a model village between 1850 and 1862, funded by the sisters Georgina and Mary Talbot. Today it is a conservation area.

== History ==
Talbot Village was created to provide housing for the unemployed parishioners of Kinson. It stands apart from other model villages, such as the Cadbury family's Bournville, which were built to house workers, who would then be able to perform their jobs with greater efficiency; the Talbot sisters received no financial return from their residents for having set up the village.

Georgina and Mary divided their year between Surrey and Hinton Wood House on the East Cliff of Bournemouth with their family, and it was while living in Bournemouth that the sisters discovered the many poor who were suffering in the region. Georgina Talbot was motivated by the death of her elder brother and her father. She used the money to help the poor of Bournemouth and Kinson because she cared about the area. Georgina did not marry, so she would be able to keep in possession of her own money and not have it taken away by her husband. Georgina and her family came to Bournemouth when she was a young girl, and she was shocked to see people begging on the streets in filth, with not enough money to provide for their families.

Between them, the Talbots sought to employ the poor to clear the land to build cottages. These were completed between 1850 and 1862. The workers were allowed to stay in the cottages and slowly, Talbot Village began to develop. The original cottages were built on an acre plot and each had a well, animal pens and fruit trees. The residents were charged a rent of between 4 and 5 shillings per week. Georgina Talbot then had 7 almshouses built for the elderly and widowed.

St Mark's Church of England Primary School was built for the village in 1862 and held 68 children. It has since been extended over the years and in 1992 an extension increased the school's capacity to 420 children.

In addition to the cottages, the village had six farms, each covering about 20 acres (8.1 ha), to create employment and trade for the village. Three of the farm buildings survive: Highmoor Farm is still operational, White Farm served as stables into the early years of the 21st century, and Lollipop Farm has been converted into a dwelling house. Slades Farm survives only as the name of a residential district built over its land.

== Conservation area ==
Between 1972 and 1976 most of the buildings and several monuments in the village were listed as being of historic interest by the Department of the Environment. In 1975, Bournemouth Council designated the village as a conservation area, covering the school, church, almshouses, cottages and the surrounding plantation, known as 'Albion Woods', or 'The Backs'. the village is also administered by the Talbot Village Trust — which was set up by the Georgina Talbot.

Any developments within the confines of the conservation area are required to 'preserve or enhance' its character and appearance – so designs have to be in keeping with the original designs. When the village was first laid out, 150 acres were set aside to remain as common land, mostly to the south of Wallisdown Road (now forming part of the Borough of Poole); this land was developed with modern housing towards the close of the 20th century. Bournemouth University has also been developed in this part of the village, partly on the site of one of the old farms.

== Governance ==
Talbot Village is part of the Wallisdown and Winton West and the Talbot and Branksome Woods wards for elections to Bournemouth, Christchurch and Poole Council.

Talbot Village is part of the Bournemouth West parliamentary constituency.
