= Battle of the Lipari Islands =

Battle between Carthage and the Roman Republic during the First Punic War

- Part of the First Punic War
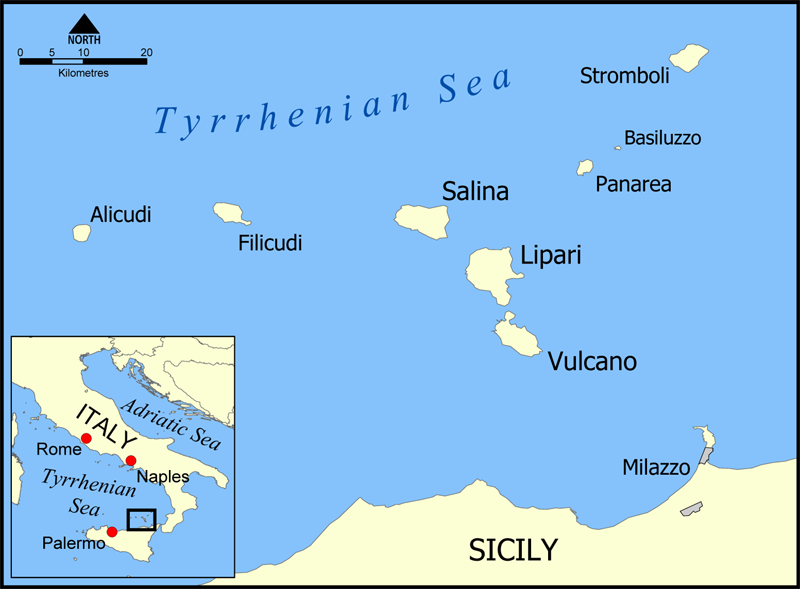
- the Lipari islands, also known as the Aeolian Islands
Date	260 BC
Location	Lipara Harbour, Sicily 38°28′21″N 14°57′39″E
Result	Carthaginian victory

Belligerents
Carthage	Roman Republic

Commanders and leaders
Boödes; Hannibal Gisco	Gnaeus Cornelius Scipio Asina (POW)

Strength
20 ships	17 ships

Casualties and losses
None	17 ships captured Scipio captured

The Battle of the Lipari Islands or Battle of Lipara was a naval encounter fought in 260 BC during the First Punic War. A squadron of 20 Carthaginian ships commanded by Boödes surprised 17 Roman ships under the senior consul for the year Gnaeus Cornelius Scipio in Lipara Harbour. The inexperienced Romans made a poor showing, with all 17 of their ships captured, along with their commander.

The Romans had recently built a fleet in order to contest the Carthaginians' maritime control of the western Mediterranean and Scipio had impetuously ventured to the Liparas with the advance squadron. The battle was little more than a skirmish, but is notable as the first naval encounter of the Punic Wars and the first time Roman warships had engaged in battle. Scipio was ransomed after the battle and known thereafter as Asina (Latin for "female donkey"). The Romans went on to win the two, larger, naval encounters that followed and establish a rough sea-going parity.

== Primary sources ==
The main source for almost every aspect of the First Punic War (Note: The term Punic comes from the Latin word Punicus (or Poenicus), meaning "Carthaginian", and is a reference to the Carthaginians' Phoenician ancestry.) is the historian Polybius (c. 200 – c. 118 BC), a Greek sent to Rome in 167 BC as a hostage. His works include a now-lost manual on military tactics, but he is best known for his work The Histories, written sometime after 146 BC, or about a century after the battle. Polybius's work is considered broadly objective and largely neutral as between Carthaginian and Roman points of view.

Carthaginian written records were destroyed along with their capital, Carthage, in 146 BC and so Polybius's account of the First Punic War is based on several, now-lost, Greek and Latin sources. Polybius was an analytical historian and wherever possible personally interviewed participants in the events he wrote about. Only the first book of the 40 comprising The Histories deals with the First Punic War. The accuracy of Polybius's account has been much debated over the past 150 years, but the modern consensus is to accept it largely at face value, and the details of the battle in modern sources are almost entirely based on interpretations of Polybius's account. The modern historian Andrew Curry considers that "Polybius turns out to [be] fairly reliable"; while Dexter Hoyos describes him as "a remarkably well-informed, industrious, and insightful historian". Other, later, histories of the war exist, but in fragmentary or summary form, and they usually cover military operations on land in more detail than those at sea. Modern historians usually also take into account the later histories of Diodorus Siculus and Dio Cassius, although the classicist Adrian Goldsworthy states that "Polybius' account is usually to be preferred when it differs with any of our other accounts". (Note: Sources other than Polybius are discussed by Bernard Mineo in "Principal Literary Sources for the Punic Wars (apart from Polybius)".)

Other sources include inscriptions, archaeological evidence, and empirical evidence from reconstructions such as the trireme Olympias. Since 2010 a number of artefacts have been recovered from the site of the Battle of the Aegates, the final battle of the war, fought nineteen years later. Their analysis and the recovery of further items are ongoing.

== Background ==
=== Operations in Sicily ===
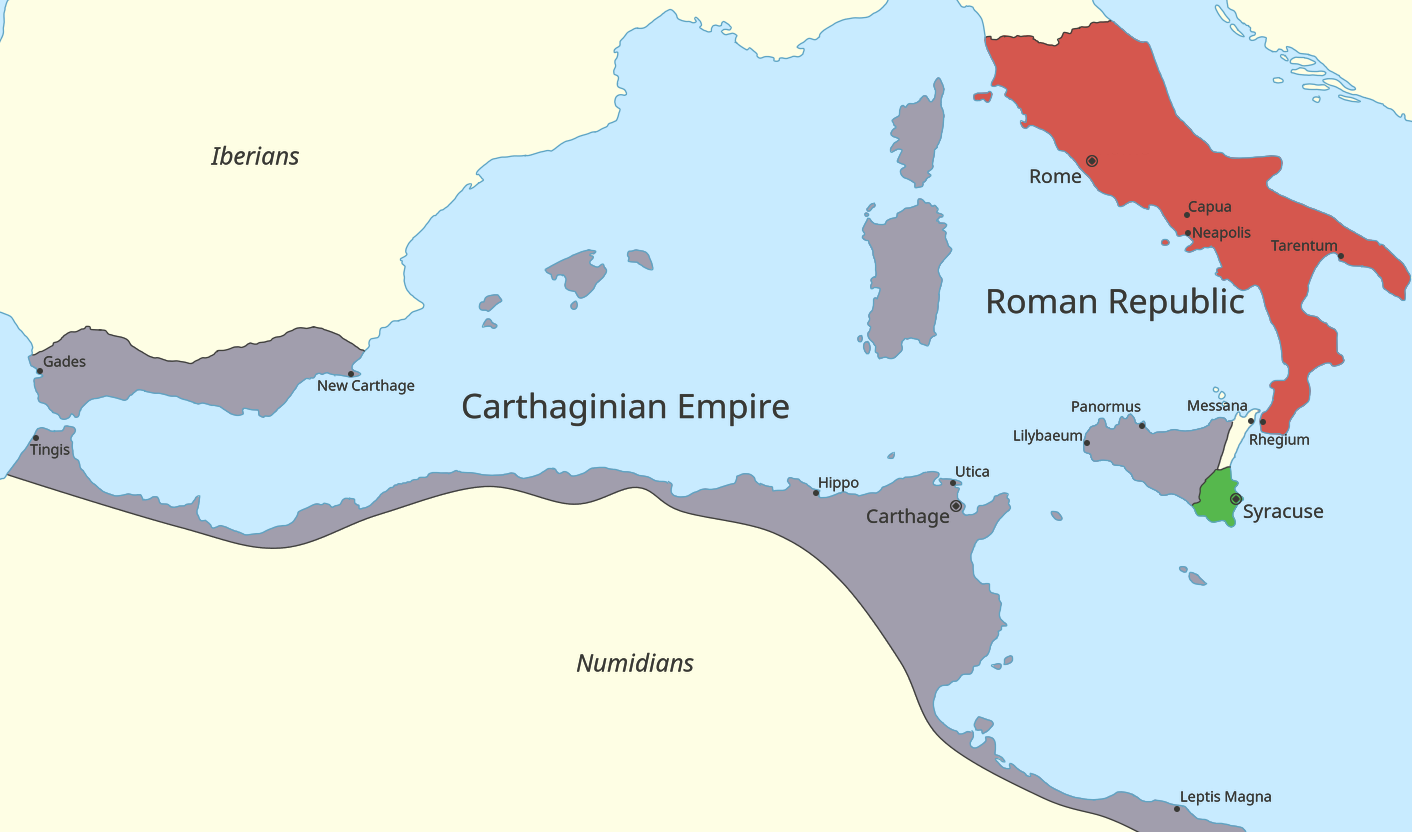
Territory controlled by Rome and Carthage at the start of the First Punic War

The First Punic War between Carthage and Rome broke out in 264 BC. Carthage was a well-established maritime power in the western Mediterranean; Rome had recently unified mainland Italy south of the River Arno under its control. The immediate cause of the war was control of the Sicilian town of Messana (modern Messina). More broadly both sides wished to control Syracuse, the most powerful city-state on Sicily. By 260 BC the war had lasted four years, and the Romans had pushed forward into Sicily, with a number of successes, including the capture of Agrigentum, an important Carthaginian base. However, the Carthaginian navy repeatedly raided the Romans' rear areas and even the coast of Italy. Their control of the sea also made it impossible for the Romans to successfully blockade those Carthaginian cities which were on the coast. The Carthaginians were engaging in their traditional policy of waiting for their opponents to wear themselves out, in the expectation of then regaining some or all of their possessions and negotiating a mutually satisfactory peace treaty.

=== Ships ===
Depiction of the position of the rowers of the three different oars in a Greek trireme

During this war the standard warship was the quinquereme, meaning "five-oared". The quinquereme was a galley, c. 45 metres (150 ft) long, c. 5 metres (16 ft) wide at water level, with its deck standing c. 3 metres (10 ft) above the sea, and displacing around 100 long tons (110 short tons; 100 tonnes). The galley expert John Coates suggested they could maintain 7 knots (8.1 mph; 13 km/h) for extended periods. The modern replica galley Olympias has achieved speeds of 8.5 knots (9.8 mph; 15.7 km/h) and cruised at 4 knots (4.6 mph; 7.4 km/h) for hours on end. Vessels were built as cataphract, or "protected", ships, with a closed hull and a full deck able to carry embarked legionaries as marines and catapults. They had a separate "oar box" attached to the main hull which contained the rowers. These features allowed the hull to be strengthened, increased carrying capacity and improved conditions for the rowers.

In 260 BC the Romans set out to construct a fleet and used a shipwrecked Carthaginian quinquereme as a blueprint for their own. As novice shipwrights, the Romans built copies that were heavier than the Carthaginian vessels, which made them slower and less manoeuvrable. The quinquereme was the workhorse of the Roman and Carthaginian fleets throughout the Punic Wars, so ubiquitous that Polybius uses it as a shorthand for "warship" in general. A quinquereme carried a crew of 300, of which 280 were oarsmen and 20 deck crew and officers; it would normally also carry a complement of 40 marines, and if battle was thought to be imminent, this would be increased to as many as 120.

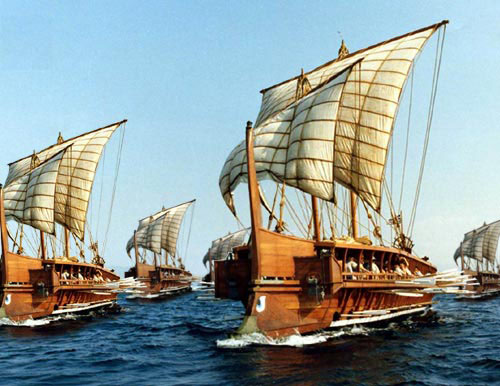
Recreation of a fleet of triremes

Getting the oarsmen to row as a unit, as well as execute more complex battle manoeuvres, required long and arduous training. At least half of the oarsmen would need to have had some experience if the ship was to be handled effectively. As a result, the Romans were initially at a disadvantage against the more experienced Carthaginians. All warships were equipped with a ram, a triple set of 60-centimetre-wide (2 ft) bronze blades weighing up to 270 kilograms (600 lb) positioned at the waterline. They were made individually by the lost-wax method to fit immovably to a galley's prow and secured with bronze spikes. In the century prior to the Punic Wars, boarding had become increasingly common and ramming had declined, as the larger and heavier vessels adopted in this period lacked the speed and manoeuvrability necessary to ram, while their sturdier construction reduced the ram's effect even in the case of a successful attack.

== Battle ==
It was the long-standing Roman procedure to elect two men each year, known as consuls, to each lead their military forces. The patrician Gnaeus Cornelius Scipio, the year's senior consul, was given command of the fleet. He put to sea with the first 17 ships produced. As the first-ever Roman warships they spent some time training in home waters before sailing to Messana. There they prepared for the main fleet's arrival and supported the logistics of the Roman army at the sea crossing to Sicily.

While Scipio was at the Strait of Messina he received information that the garrison of the city of Lipara was willing to defect to the Roman side. Lipara was the main port of the Lipari Islands and was a constant threat to Roman communications across the Strait. Though his crews were still inexperienced and the newly designed and built ships were still undergoing their sea trials, the consul could not resist the temptation of conquering an important city without a fight and sailed to Lipara. It has been suggested by some ancient sources that the offer to surrender Lipara was a ruse inspired by Carthage to encourage the Romans to commit their ships where they could be ambushed, but the sources do not give much detail and are usually pro-Roman.

The Romans entered the harbour at Lipara. The Carthaginian fleet was commanded by Hannibal Gisco, the general who had commanded the garrison at Agrigentum, and was based at Panormus (modern-day Palermo) some 100 kilometres (62 mi) from Lipari. When he heard of the Romans' advance to Lipara he despatched 20 ships under Boödes, a Carthaginian aristocrat, to the town. The Carthaginians arrived at night and trapped the Romans in the harbour. Boödes led his ships in an attack on the Romans inside the harbour the next morning. Scipio's men offered little resistance. The inexperienced crews were no match for the well-drilled Carthaginians and were rapidly outfought. Some Romans panicked and fled inland and the consul himself was taken prisoner, along with many of the other Roman senior officers. Some later accounts have Scipio treacherously captured while parleying, but this is probably a Roman fabrication. All of the Roman ships were captured, most with little damage. The battle was little more than a skirmish, but is notable as the first naval encounter of the Punic Wars and the first time Roman warships had engaged in battle.

== Aftermath ==
The corvus, the Roman ship boarding device

Scipio was later released, probably ransomed. His easy defeat earned him the pejorative cognomen Asina, which means donkey in Latin. This cognomen was all the more insulting because "asina" was the feminine form of the word donkey, as opposed to the masculine form "asinus". In spite of this Scipio's career prospered and he was consul for a second time in 254 BC.

Shortly after the Lipara victory, Hannibal Gisco was scouting with 50 Carthaginian ships when he encountered the full Roman fleet. He escaped, but lost most of his ships. It was after this skirmish that the Romans installed the corvus on their ships. The corvus was a bridge 1.2 m (4 ft) wide and 11 m (36 ft) long, with a heavy spike on the underside, which was designed to pierce and anchor into an enemy ship's deck. This allowed marines to more easily board enemy ships and capture them.

Later the same year Scipio's fellow consul, Gaius Duilius, placed the Roman army units under subordinates and took command of the fleet. He promptly sailed, seeking battle. The two fleets met off the coast of Mylae in the Battle of Mylae. Hannibal Gisco had 130 ships, and the historian John Lazenby calculates that Duilius had approximately the same number. Using the corvus the Romans captured 50 Carthaginian vessels (Note: The figures for Carthaginian losses are taken from Polybius. Other ancient sources give 30 or 31 ships captured and 13 or 14 sunk.) and dealt the Carthaginians a sharp defeat.

The war was to last for another 19 years before ending in a Carthaginian defeat and a negotiated peace. Thereafter Rome was the leading military power in the western Mediterranean, and increasingly the Mediterranean region as a whole. The Romans had built more than 1,000 galleys during the war, and this experience of building, manning, training, supplying, and maintaining such numbers of ships laid the foundation for Rome's maritime dominance for 600 years.

== Notes, citations and sources ==
=== Sources ===
- Bagnall, Nigel (1999). The Punic Wars: Rome, Carthage and the Struggle for the Mediterranean. London: Pimlico. ISBN 978-0-7126-6608-4.
- Casson, Lionel (1995). Ships and Seamanship in the Ancient World. Baltimore: Johns Hopkins University Press. ISBN 978-0-8018-5130-8.
- Coates, John F. (1995). "The Naval Architecture and Oar Systems of Ancient Galleys". In Morrison, John S.; Gardiner, Robert (eds.). The Age of the Galley: Mediterranean Oared Vessels Since Pre-Classical Times. London: Conway Maritime Press. pp. 127–141. ISBN 0-85177-554-3.
- Curry, Andrew (2012). "The Weapon That Changed History". Archaeology. 65 (1): 32–37. JSTOR 41780760.
- Goldsworthy, Adrian (2006). The Fall of Carthage: The Punic Wars 265–146 BC. London: Phoenix. ISBN 978-0-304-36642-2.
- Harris, William (1979). War and Imperialism in Republican Rome, 327-70 BC. Oxford: Clarendon Press. ISBN 978-0-19-814866-1.
- Hau, Lisa (2016). Moral History from Herodotus to Diodorus Siculus. Edinburgh: Edinburgh University Press. ISBN 978-1-4744-1107-3.
- Hoyos, Dexter (2015) [2011]. A Companion to the Punic Wars. Chichester, West Sussex: John Wiley. ISBN 978-1-1190-2550-4.
- Lazenby, John (1996). The First Punic War: A Military History. Stanford, California: Stanford University Press. ISBN 978-0-8047-2673-3.
- Meijer, Fik (1986). A History of Seafaring in the Classical World. London; Sydney: Croom and Helm. ISBN 978-0-7099-3565-0.
- Miles, Richard (2011). Carthage Must be Destroyed. London: Penguin. ISBN 978-0-14-101809-6.
- Mineo, Bernard (2015) [2011]. "Principal Literary Sources for the Punic Wars (apart from Polybius)". In Hoyos, Dexter (ed.). A Companion to the Punic Wars. Chichester, West Sussex: John Wiley. pp. 111–128. ISBN 978-1-1190-2550-4.
- Murray, William (2011). The Age of Titans: The Rise and Fall of the Great Hellenistic Navies. Oxford: Oxford University Press. ISBN 978-0-19-993240-5.
- Rankov, Boris (2015) [2011]. "A War of Phases: Strategies and Stalemates". In Hoyos, Dexter (ed.). A Companion to the Punic Wars. Chichester, West Sussex: John Wiley. pp. 149–166. ISBN 978-1-4051-7600-2.
- Royal, Jeffrey G.; Tusa, Sebastiano, eds. (2019). The Site of the Battle of the Aegates Islands at the End of the First Punic War. Fieldwork, Analyses and Perspectives, 2005–2015. Bibliotheca Archaeologica. Vol. 60. Rome: L'Erma di Bretschneider. ISBN 978-88-913-1835-0.
- Shutt, Rowland (1938). "Polybius: A Sketch". Greece & Rome. 8 (22): 50–57. doi:10.1017/S001738350000588X. JSTOR 642112. S2CID 162905667.
- Sidwell, Keith C.; Jones, Peter V. (1997). The World of Rome: An Introduction to Roman Culture. Cambridge University Press. ISBN 978-0-521-38600-5.
- de Souza, Philip (2008). "Naval Forces". In Sabin, Philip; van Wees, Hans & Whitby, Michael (eds.). The Cambridge History of Greek and Roman Warfare, Volume 1: Greece, the Hellenistic World and the Rise of Rome. Cambridge: Cambridge University Press. pp. 357–367. ISBN 978-0-521-85779-6.
- Tipps, G.K. (1985). "The Battle of Ecnomus". Historia: Zeitschrift für Alte Geschichte. 34 (4): 432–465. JSTOR 4435938.
- Tusa, Sebastiano; Royal, Jeffrey (2012). "The Landscape of the Naval Battle at the Egadi Islands (241 B.C.)" (PDF). Journal of Roman Archaeology. 25. Cambridge University Press: 7–48. doi:10.1017/S1047759400001124. ISSN 1047-7594. S2CID 159518193.
- Walbank, F.W. (1990). Polybius. Vol. 1. Berkeley: University of California Press. ISBN 978-0-520-06981-7.
- Wallinga, Herman (1956). The Boarding-bridge of the Romans: Its Construction and its Function in the Naval Tactics of the First Punic War. Groningen: J.B. Wolters. OCLC 458845955.
- Warmington, Brian (1993) [1960]. Carthage. New York: Barnes & Noble, Inc. ISBN 978-1-56619-210-1.
