= Charles Willink =

English classical scholar, teacher and baronet

Sir Charles William Willink, 2nd Baronet (10 September 1929 – 10 March 2009) was an English classical scholar, teacher and baronet. He succeeded his father Sir Henry Willink to the Willink Baronetcy on his death in 1973, and was himself succeeded on his death by his son Sir Edward Daniel Willink.

== Life ==
Sir Henry's eldest son, Charles won a King's Scholarship to Eton College (where he was a friend and contemporary of Douglas Hurd, and won the Newcastle Scholarship a year before him) before reading an MA and PhD in Classics at Trinity College, Cambridge. He married the artist Elizabeth Andrewes in 1954 and they had two children, Edward and Penelope.

He then entered teaching, first at Marlborough College and then (from 1954 to 1984) at Eton, where he rose to housemaster. He was a specialist in ancient Greek metre and tragedy. His publications include an Oxford University Press edition of Orestes by Euripides with commentary, and numerous journal articles and reviews. Willink was one of the foremost Euripides scholars of his era. From 1982 he also cooperated with his Cambridge tutor John Morrison, the banker Frank Welsh and the naval architect John Coates to produce a full-size replica of a Greek trireme, founding the Trireme Trust with them and culminating in the launch of the Olympias in 1987. After his retirement he became an expert amateur botanist, specialising in flowers on Hampstead Heath and chairing Highgate cemetery.

== Arms ==
Coat of arms of Charles Willink
| Crest Issuant from a wreath of oak leaves Or a dexter cubit arm bendwise grasping in the hand a chaplet of laurel Proper. Escutcheon Azure three acorns on one stem slipped Or. Motto Fides Et Amor |

== Sources ==
- "Obituary". The Times. 19 March 2009. Archived from the original on 23 May 2010.

Baronetage of the United Kingdom
| Preceded by Sir Henry Willink | Baronet (of Dingle Bank); 1973–2009 | Succeeded by Sir Edward Willink |
