= Geoffrey Coates =

Geoffrey Coates may refer to:

- Geoffrey E. Coates (1917–2013), British chemist
- Geoffrey W. Coates (born 1966), American chemist
