= Bodo (hypostrategos) =

Bodo (Punic: 𐤁𐤃𐤀, BDʾ, "His Servant" or "In His Hand") also known as Boödes (Ancient Greek: Βοώδης, Boṓdēs), was a Carthaginian senator and naval officer (hypostrategos) who served during the First Punic War. He commanded a successful expedition to Lipara where he captured the Roman consul Gn. Cornelius Scipio Asina.

== See also ==
- Baal Hamon & Melqart, major Punic deities
