= Charles Shoppee =

British-born organic chemist

Professor Charles William Shoppee FAA FRS

Swansea University Chair of Chemistry Department
- In office 1946–1956
- Preceded by: Joseph E. Coates
- Succeeded by: Cedric Hassall

Personal details
- Born: 24 February 1904 Crouch End
- Died: 20 October 1994 (aged 90)
- Citizenship: British
- Education: Imperial College
- Occupation: Chemist

Charles William Shoppee FAA FRS (1904–1994) was a British-born Australian organic chemist who performed major research into steroids. He was Professor of Chemistry at the University College of Swansea (1946–1956) and Professor of Organic Chemistry at the University of Sydney (1956–1969).

The short citation on his election as Fellow of the Australian Academy of Science (in 1958) reads: [Shoppee] "is distinguished for his contributions to organic chemistry, with special reference to the investigation of problems of reaction mechanism, the establishment of the structures of the adreno-cortical hormones, and the elucidation of stereochemical relationships in the steroid field."

Born on 24 February 1904 at Crouch End, (London, UK), to Joseph William and Emma Elizabeth Shoppee (née Hawkswell of York), he was educated at the Stationers' Company's School and Imperial College (Royal College of Science). Early positions were at the University of Leeds (1924-1938), Basel (1938-1945) and the University of London (1945-1948). He married Eileen West on 18 July 1929 and completed a D.Sc. from the University of London in 1931.

From 1948 to 1956 he was Professor of Chemistry at the University College, Swansea, of the University of Wales, he gave his inaugural lecture on 27 January 1949 titled The Carbon Atom. From 1956 until his compulsory retirement he was Professor of Organic Chemistry at the University of Sydney. He was elected Fellow of the Royal Society (1956) and Fellow of the Australian Academy of Science (1958).

On his retirement in 1969, aged 65, he accepted the position of Foundation Welch Professorship of Chemistry at Texas Technological University (1970–1974). He returned to Australia in 1975, where he served as an honorary professorial fellow at Macquarie University (1976–1979) and was honorary visiting professor at La Trobe University from 1980 where he was still active in the laboratory in 1991. He died on 20 October 1994 (aged 90).
