= Grove Building =

- Adeilad Grove
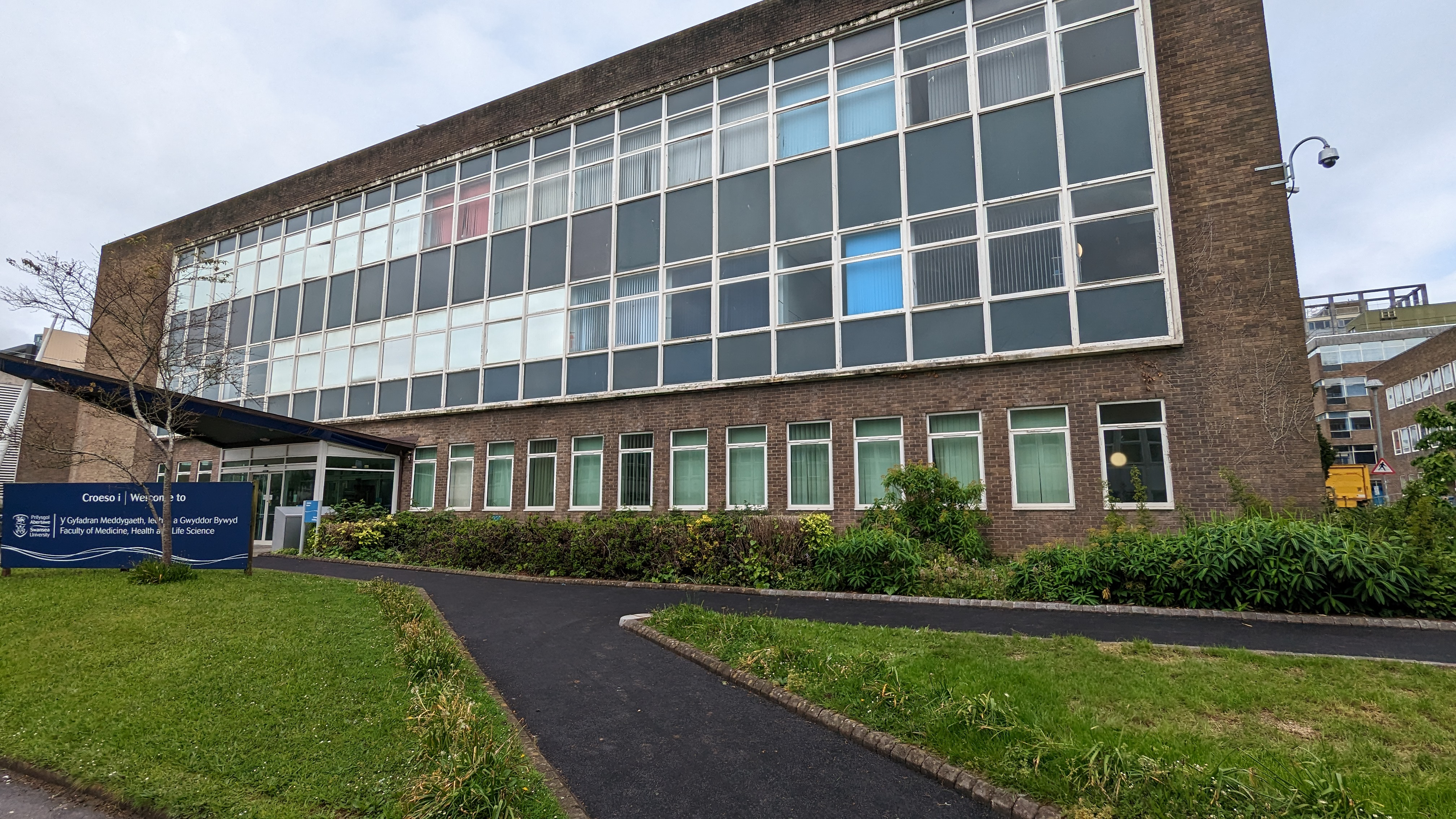
- Interactive map of the Grove Building area
- Former names: Chemistry Building

General information
- Location: Singleton Park, Swansea
- Coordinates: 51.6093°N 3.9815°W
- Opened: 1961
- Owner: Swansea University

Technical details
- Floor count: 3

The Grove Building is a Swansea University building, in Singleton Park, Swansea, Wales.

== History ==
Originally it was known as the Chemistry Building having been built to provide a permanent home for the Department of Chemistry, most likely designed by the architects from the Sir Percy Thomas Partnership who were responsible for the design of the adjacent buildings. The building was in use by 1 December 1961 when the founder Professor of Chemistry, Prof J. E. Coates was presented with a portrait 'as a mark of the respect and esteem in which his contribution to chemistry in Swansea' by colleagues and students which he donated to Swansea University for hanging in the corridor of the new building. The building was renamed in the 1990s in honour of Sir William Grove (1811–1896).

The building layout is based along a central spine corridor with three wings on each side which contains a range of academic offices, laboratories and lecture theatres. A further wing with four floors known as the Grove Extension is at the rear of the building but is only accessible via the second-level walkway. The Grove lecture theatre is named for Sir William Grove (1811–1896) which was dedicated on 21 August 1990 by Lord Callaghan and the Purnell lecture theatre for Prof Howard Purnell (1925–1996) which was dedicated on 10 May 1996 by Sir John Cadogan.

The building now houses the Medical School, Pharmacy, and Chemistry.

== Location ==
The building lies to the South West of the Fulton Lawn in Singleton Park, Swansea.
