= Willink baronets =

Baronetcy in the Baronetage of the United Kingdom

The Willink Baronetcy, of Dingle Bank in the City of Liverpool, is a title in the Baronetage of the United Kingdom. It was created on 20 July 1957 for the Conservative politician and public servant Henry Willink. He served as Minister of Health from 1943 to 1945. As of 2010 the title is held by his grandson, the third Baronet, who succeeded in 2009.

== Willink baronets, of Dingle Bank (1957) ==
- Sir Henry Urmston Willink, 1st Baronet (1894–1973)
- Sir Charles William Willink, 2nd Baronet (1929–2009)
- Sir Edward Daniel Willink, 3rd Baronet (born 1957)

The heir presumptive is the present holder's cousin Henry Augustine Willink (born 1971). There are no further heirs to the title.

Coat of arms of Willink baronets
Crest Issuant from a wreath of oak leaves Or a dexter cubit arm bendwise grasping in the hand a chaplet of laurel Proper. Escutcheon Azure three acorns on one stem slipped Or. Motto Fides Et Amor
