= Joseph E. Coates =

Professor Joseph Edward Coates OBE
- Born: 1883
- Died: 1973 (aged 89–90)
- Education: Bangor University
- Employer: Swansea University
- Spouse: Ada Coates
- Children: Geoffrey Edward Coates, John Francis Coates

1st Swansea University Head of the Department of Chemistry
- In office 1920–1948
- Preceded by: Office established
- Succeeded by: Charles Shoppee
- Scientific career
- Fields: Chemistry
- Workplaces: Swansea University

Joseph E. Coates, OBE was a British physical chemist and academic. He was the first Professor of chemistry and head of the department of Swansea University.

== Early life and career ==
J.E. Coates had studied as a student at Bangor University under the supervision of K. J. P. Orton. He then worked at University College London alongside Sir William Ramsay before moving to Karlsruhe Institute of Technology to work with Fritz Haber. During the First World War, he served with the Royal Naval Air Service as a Senior Technical Officer at the R.N. Experimental Station, Stratford before moving in 1919 to Birmingham University. Following the establishment of Swansea University in 1920 was called to the professorship of chemistry and was the first head of the chemistry department. Coates was the first president of the University College of Swansea Chemical Society (1921-1926) and he served twice as chair of the South Wales Section of the then Royal Institute of Chemistry in 1924-26 and 1931-33. In 1944, Coates argued for a new and modern building to house the Chemistry Department, to provide expansion of research capacity with increased staff and research funds. He retired in 1948 and was succeeded by Professor C.W. Shoppee (1904-1994). At a ceremony on the 1 December 1962, Coates was presented with a portrait by the artist, Mr Kenneth W. Hancock, Principal of Swansea College of Art, which was then accepted by Professor C. H. Hassall, the present occupant of the chair, from Professor Coates for hanging in the corridor of the new Chemistry Department building.

== Personal life ==
J.E. Coates was married to Ada Coates and had two children together the chemist Geoffrey Edward Coates and naval architect John Francis Coates. Coates died in 1974.
