= John Sinclair Morrison =

English classicist

John Sinclair Morrison CBE FBA
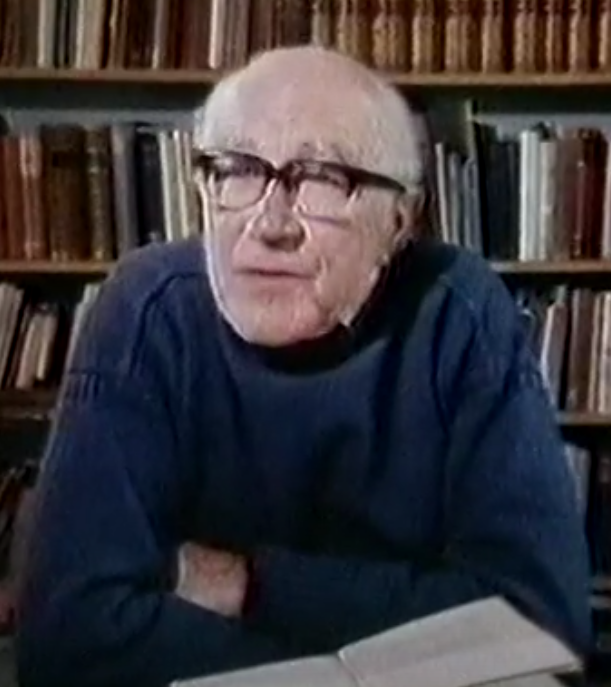
- Born: 15 June 1913; Lindfield, West Sussex, England
- Died: 25 October 2000 (aged 87)
- Occupation: English classicist

John Sinclair Morrison CBE (15 June 1913 – 25 October 2000) was an English classicist whose work led to the reconstruction of an Athenian Trireme, an ancient oared warship.

From Lindfield, Sussex, Morrison was educated at Charterhouse and Trinity College, Cambridge. He was professor of Greek and head of the classics department at the University of Durham from 1945 to 1950. He was a Tutor at Trinity from 1950 to 1960, then vice-master of Churchill College, from 1960 to 1965.when he became the first President of University College, later renamed Wolfson College.

He was considered an expert on the Greek trireme, the oared warship of the Athenian classical golden age, and is best known as one of the founders in 1982, with Charles Willink, another classics teacher, John Coates, a naval architect, and Frank Welsh, a banker, of the Trireme Trust, to test his theories about the Athenian trireme by building a full-size reconstruction. In 1984, the Greek Government promised funding, and in 1987 the Olympias was commissioned.

With R. T. Williams, Morrison wrote Greek Oared Ships: 900–322 BC; Long Ships and Round Ships (1980); with John Coates, The Athenian Trireme: the History and Reconstruction of an Ancient Greek Warship (1986); with J. F. Coates, Greek and Roman Oared Warships (1996); and other works.

His elder daughter, Annis Garfield, the classicist and author, was an alumna of Girton College, and was voted the most beautiful girl in Cambridge in 1968.

In 1991 he was awarded the Caird Medal of the National Maritime Museum, jointly with John Coates.

In 1989, he was awarded an Honorary Degree (Doctor of Letters) by the University of Bath.

He died on 25 October 2000 at the age of 87.
