= Fik Meijer =

Dutch historian and author (born 1942)

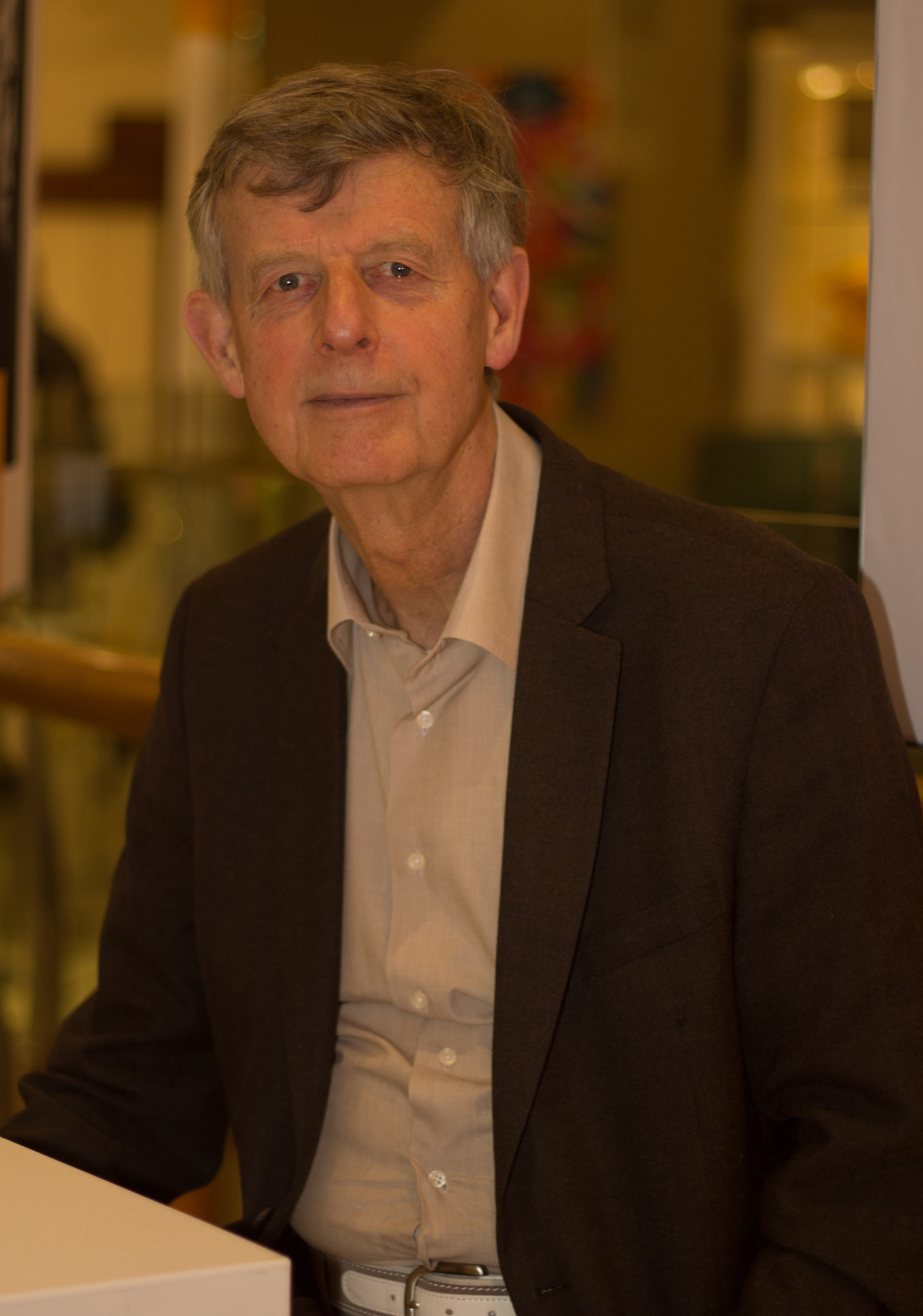
Photo of Fik Meijer

Fik Meijer (born 12 August 1942) is a Dutch historian and author.

== Life ==
He studied classics and ancient history at Leiden University and graduated in 1973.

He is an emeritus professor of ancient history at the University of Amsterdam.

== Career ==
His books have been translated into multiple languages.

His book about Gladiators was very well researched and has consistently received good reviews.

== Bibliography ==
Some of his notable books are:

- Fik Meijer (2004). Emperors Don't Die in Bed. Psychology Press. ISBN 978-0-415-31201-1.
- Fik Meijer (6 March 2007). The Gladiators: History's Most Deadly Sport. St. Martin's Press. ISBN 978-0-312-36402-1.
- Fik Meijer (1 September 2010). Chariot Racing in the Roman Empire. Johns Hopkins University Press. ISBN 978-0-8018-9697-2.
- Fik Meijer (17 June 2014). A History of Seafaring in the Classical World (Routledge Revivals). Taylor & Francis. ISBN 978-1-317-70110-1.
- Onno Van Nijf; Fik Meijer (14 October 2014). Trade, Transport and Society in the Ancient World (Routledge Revivals): A Sourcebook. Routledge. ISBN 978-1-317-57599-3.
