= Trireme =

Ancient vessel with three banks of oars

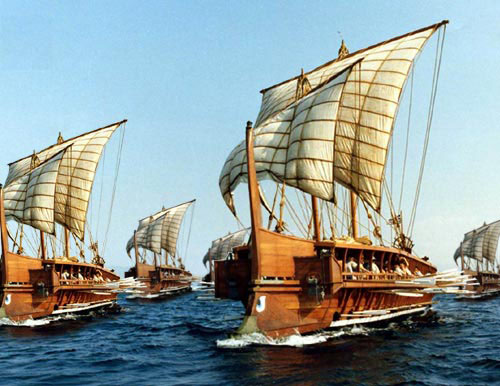
Fleet of triremes made up of photographs of the modern full-sized replica Olympias

A trireme (/ˈtraɪriːm/ TRY-reem; from Latin trirēmis 'with three banks of oars'; cf. Ancient Greek: τριήρης, romanized: triḗrēs, lit. 'three-rower') was an ancient vessel and a type of galley that was used by the ancient maritime civilizations of the Mediterranean Sea, especially the Phoenicians, ancient Greeks and Romans.

The trireme derives its name from its three rows of oars, manned with one man per oar. The early trireme was a development of the penteconter, an ancient warship with a single row of 25 oars on each side (i.e., a single-banked boat), and of the bireme (Ancient Greek: διήρης, diērēs), a warship with two banks of oars, of Phoenician origin. The word dieres does not appear until the Roman period. According to Morrison and Williams, "It must be assumed the term pentekontor covered the two-level type". As a ship, it was fast and agile and was the dominant warship in the Mediterranean from the 7th to the 4th centuries BC, after which it was largely superseded by the larger quadriremes and quinqueremes. Triremes played a vital role in the Persian Wars, the creation of the Athenian maritime empire and its downfall during the Peloponnesian War.

Medieval and early modern galleys with three files of oarsmen per side are sometimes referred to as triremes.

== History ==
=== Origins ===
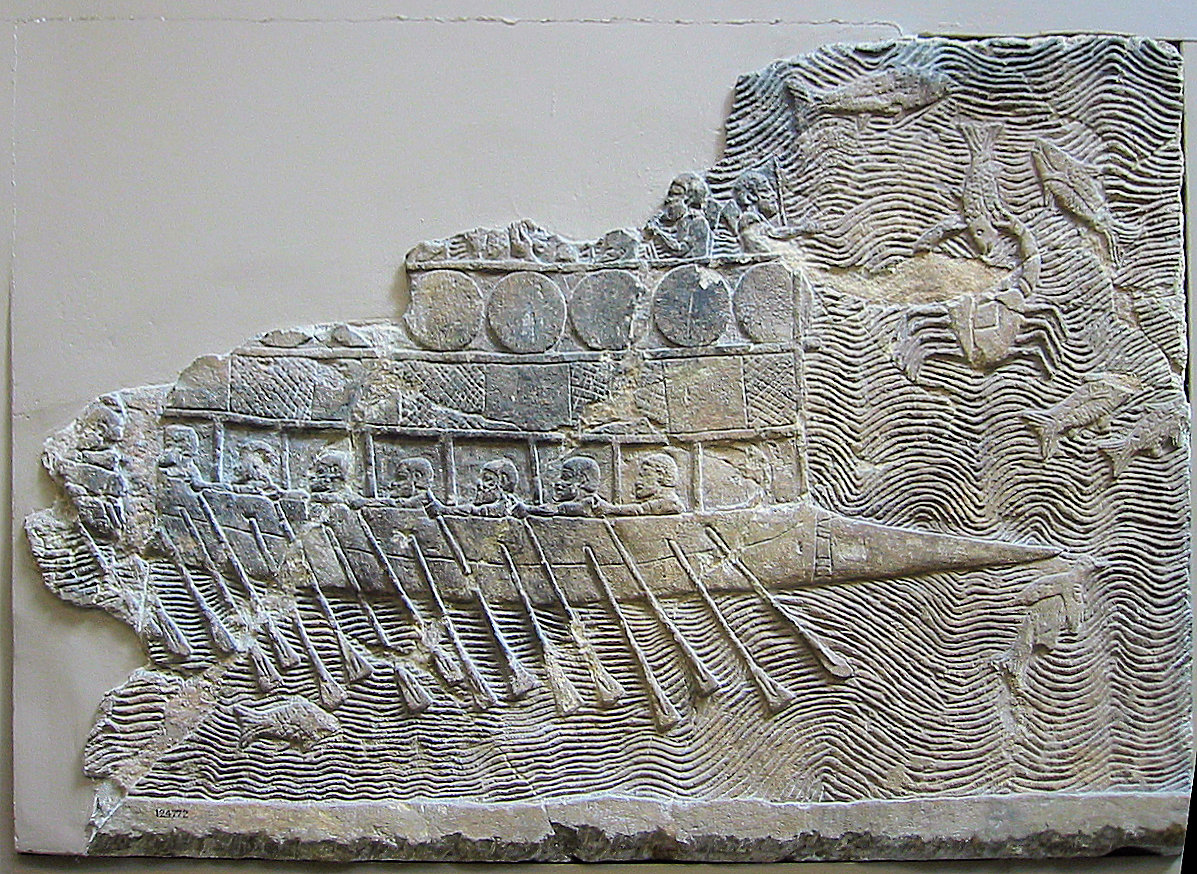
Phoenician warship with two rows of oars, relief from Nineveh, c. 700 BC

Depictions of two-banked ships (biremes), with or without the parexeiresia (the outriggers, see below), are common in 8th century BC and later vases and pottery fragments, and it is at the end of that century that the first references to three-banked ships are found. Fragments from an 8th-century relief at the Assyrian capital of Nineveh depicting the fleets of Tyre and Sidon show ships with rams, and fitted with oars pivoted at two levels. They have been interpreted as two-decked warships, and also as triremes.

Modern scholarship is divided on the provenance of the trireme, Greece or Phoenicia, and the exact time it developed into the foremost ancient fighting ship. According to Thucydides, the trireme was introduced to Greece by the Corinthians in the late 8th century BC, and the Corinthian Ameinocles built four such ships for the Samians. This was interpreted by later writers, Pliny and Diodorus, to mean that triremes were invented in Corinth. Clement of Alexandria in the 2nd century, drawing on earlier works, explicitly attributes the invention of the trireme (trikrotos naus, "three-banked ship") to the Sidonians the possibility remains that the earliest three-banked warships originated in Phoenicia.

=== Early use and development ===
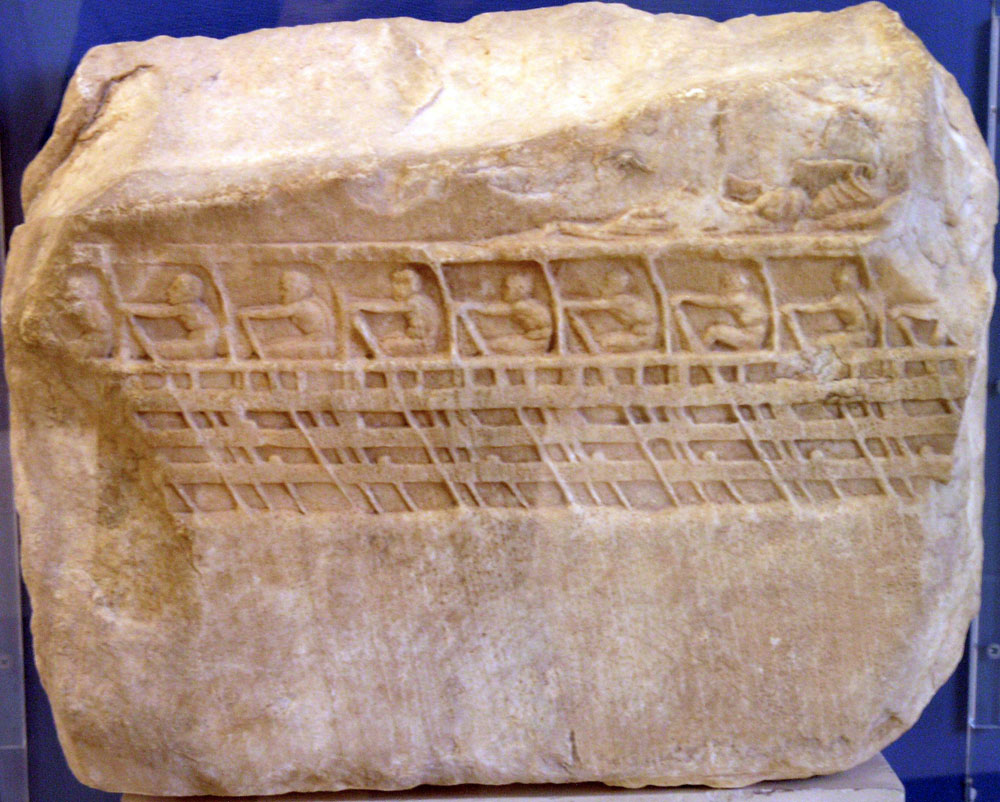
The Lenormant Relief, from the Athenian Acropolis, depicting the rowers of an aphract Athenian trireme, c. 410 BC. Found in 1852, it is one of the main pictorial testaments to the layout of the trireme.

Herodotus mentions that the Egyptian pharaoh Necho II (610–595 BC) built triremes on the Nile, for service in the Mediterranean, and in the Red Sea, but this reference is disputed by modern historians, and attributed to a confusion, since "triērēs" was by the 5th century used in the generic sense of "warship", regardless its type. The first definite reference to the use of triremes in naval combat dates to c. 525 BC, when, according to Herodotus, the tyrant Polycrates of Samos was able to contribute 40 triremes to a Persian invasion of Egypt (Battle of Pelusium). The Persians were the first nation to use triremes in significant numbers. By 490 BC, triremes were the backbone of the Persian fleet. Thucydides clearly states that in the time of the Persian Wars, the majority of the Greek navies consisted of (probably two-tiered) penteconters and ploia makrá ("long ships").

In any case, by the early 5th century, the trireme was becoming the dominant warship type of the eastern Mediterranean, with minor differences between the "Greek" and "Phoenician" types, as literary references and depictions of the ships on coins make clear. The first large-scale naval battle where triremes participated was the Battle of Lade during the Ionian Revolt, where the combined fleets of the Greek Ionian cities were defeated by the Persian fleet, composed of squadrons from their Phoenician, Carian, and Egyptian subjects.

=== The Persian Wars ===
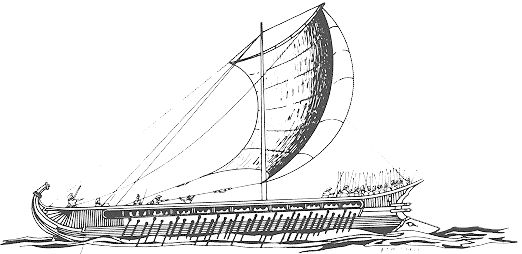
A Greek trireme

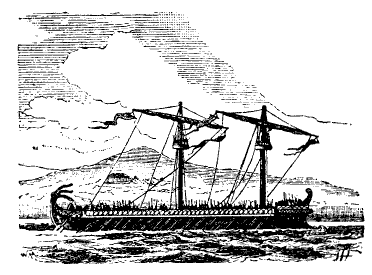
Trireme, illustration from book Nordisk familjebok

Athens was at that time embroiled in a conflict with the neighbouring island of Aegina, which possessed a formidable navy. In order to counter this, and possibly with an eye already at the mounting Persian preparations, in 483/2 BC the Athenian statesman Themistocles used his political skills and influence to persuade the Athenian assembly to start the construction of 200 triremes, using the income of the newly discovered silver mines at Laurion. The first clash with the Persian navy was at the Battle of Artemisium, where both sides suffered great casualties. However, the decisive naval clash occurred at Salamis, where Xerxes' invasion fleet was decisively defeated.

After Salamis and another Greek victory over the Persian fleet at Mycale, the Ionian cities were freed, and the Delian League was formed under the aegis of Athens. Gradually, the predominance of Athens turned the League effectively into an Athenian Empire. The source and foundation of Athens' power was her strong fleet, composed of over 200 triremes. It not only secured control of the Aegean Sea and the loyalty of her allies, but also safeguarded the trade routes and the grain shipments from the Black Sea, which fed the city's burgeoning population. In addition, as it provided permanent employment for the city's poorer citizens, the fleet played an important role in maintaining and promoting the radical Athenian form of democracy. Athenian maritime power is the first example of thalassocracy in world history. Aside from Athens, other major naval powers of the era included Syracuse, Corfu and Corinth.

In the subsequent Peloponnesian War, naval battles fought by triremes were crucial in the power balance between Athens and Sparta. Despite numerous land engagements, Athens was finally defeated through the destruction of her fleet during the Sicilian Expedition, and finally, at the Battle of Aegospotami, at the hands of Sparta and her allies.

== Design ==
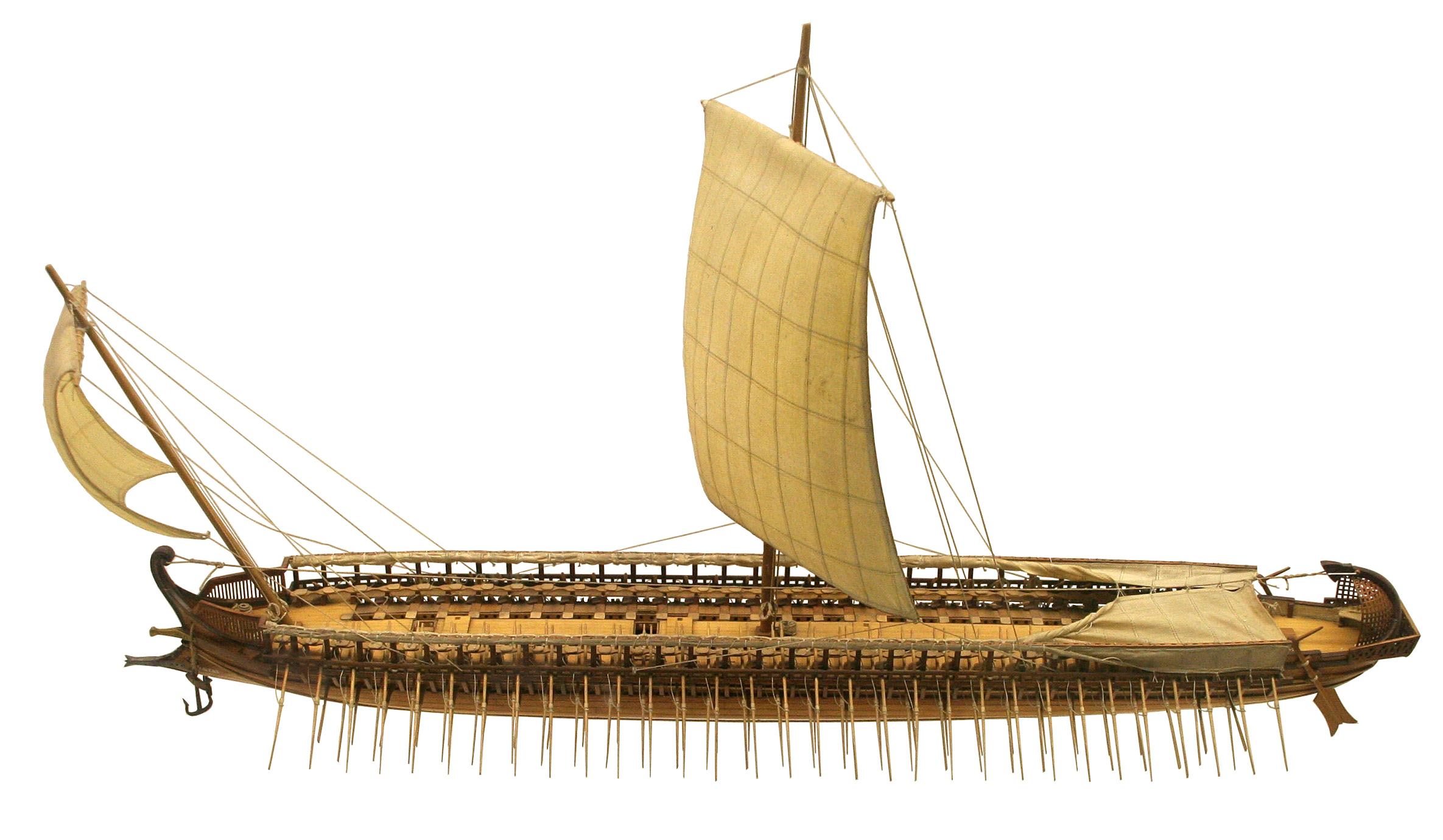
Model of a Greek trireme

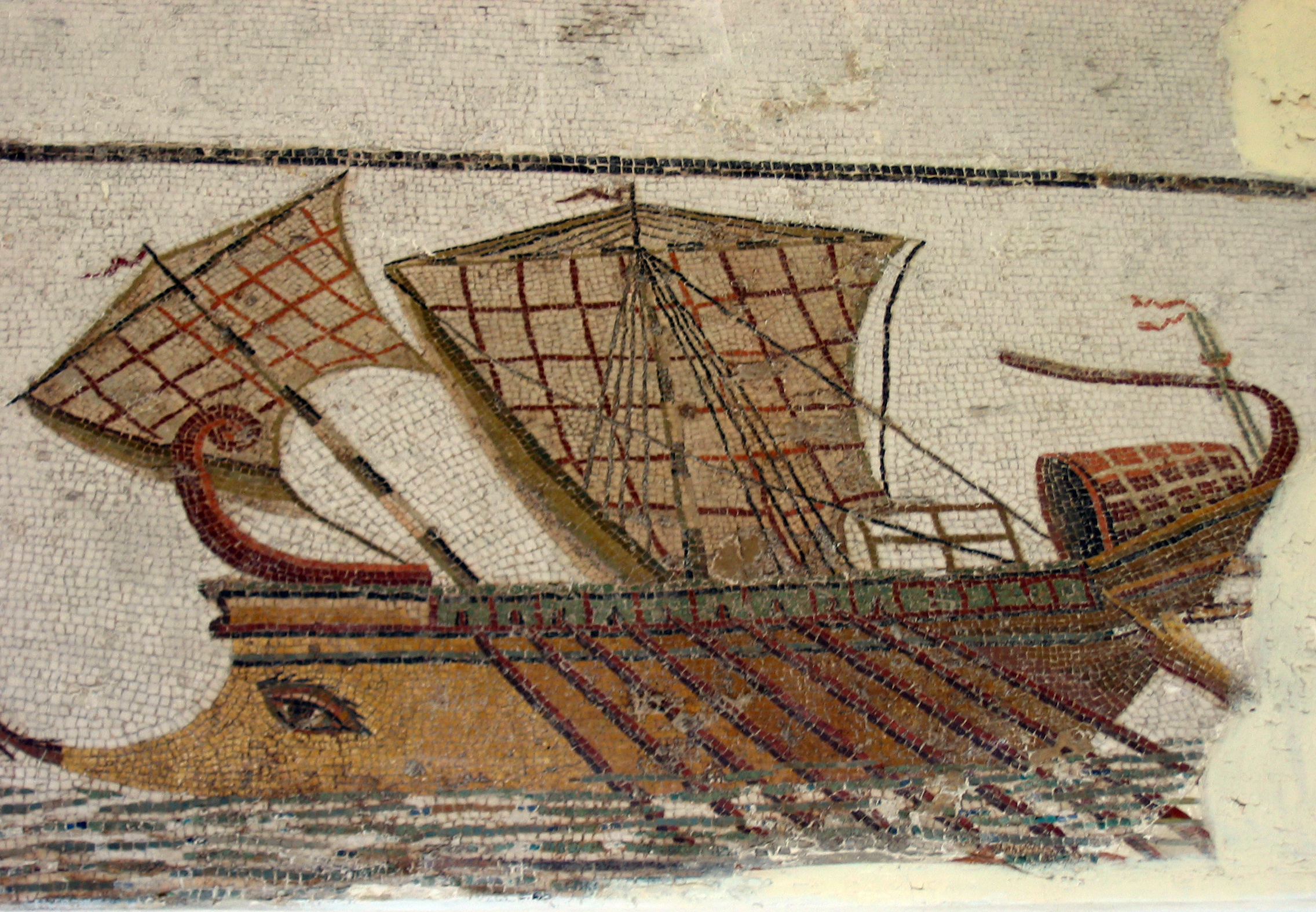
A Roman mosaic from Tunisia showing a trireme vessel during the Roman Empire

Based on all archeological evidence, the design of the trireme most likely pushed the technological limits of the ancient world. After gathering the proper timbers and materials it was time to consider the fundamentals of the trireme design. These fundamentals included accommodations, propulsion, weight and waterline, centre of gravity and stability, strength, and feasibility. All of these variables are dependent on one another; however a certain area may be more important than another depending on the purpose of the ship.

The arrangement and number of oarsmen is the first deciding factor in the size of the ship. For a ship to travel at high speeds would require a high oar-gearing, which is the ratio between the outboard length of an oar and the inboard length; it is this arrangement of the oars which is unique and highly effective for the trireme. The ports would house the oarsmen with a minimal waste of space. There would be three files of oarsmen on each side tightly but workably packed by placing each man outboard of, and in height overlapping, the one below, provided that thalamian tholes were set inboard and their ports enlarged to allow oar movement. Thalamian, zygian, and thranite are the English terms for thalamios (θαλάμιος), zygios (ζύγιος), and thranites (θρανίτης), the Greek words for the oarsmen in, respectively the lowest, middle, and uppermost files of the triereis. The tholes were pins that acted as fulcrums to the oars that allowed them to move. The center of gravity of the ship is low because of the overlapping formation of the files that allow the ports to remain closer to the ships walls. A lower center of gravity would provide adequate stability.

The trireme was constructed to maximize all traits of the ship to the point where if any changes were made the design would be compromised. Speed was maximized to the point where any less weight would have resulted in considerable losses to the ship's integrity. The center of gravity was placed at the lowest possible position where the Thalamian tholes were just above the waterline which retained the ship's resistance to waves and the possible rollover. If the center of gravity were placed any higher, the additional beams needed to restore stability would have resulted in the exclusion of the Thalamian tholes due to the reduced hull space. The purpose of the area just below the center of gravity and the waterline known as the hypozomata (ὑποζώματα) was to allow bending of the hull when faced with up to 90 kN of force. The calculations of forces that could have been absorbed by the ship are arguable because there is not enough evidence to confirm the exact process of jointing used in ancient times. In a modern reconstruction of the ship, a polysulphide sealant was used to compare to the caulking that evidence suggests was used; however this is also contentious because there is simply not enough evidence to authentically reproduce the triereis seams.

Triremes required a great deal of upkeep in order to stay afloat, as references to the replacement of ropes, sails, rudders, oars and masts in the middle of campaigns suggest. They also would become waterlogged if left in the sea for too long. In order to prevent this from happening, ships would have to be pulled from the water during the night. The use of lightwoods meant that the ship could be carried ashore by as few as 140 men. Beaching the ships at night, however, would leave the troops vulnerable to surprise attacks. While well-maintained triremes would last up to 25 years, during the Peloponnesian War, Athens had to build nearly 20 triremes a year to maintain their fleet of 300.

The Athenian trireme had two great cables of about 47 mm in diameter and twice the ship's length called hypozomata (undergirding), and carried two spares. They were possibly rigged fore and aft from end to end along the middle line of the hull just under the main beams and tensioned to 13.5 tonnes force. The hypozomata were considered important and secret: their export from Athens was a capital offense. This cable would act as a stretched tendon straight down the middle of the hull, and would have prevented hogging. Additionally, hull plank butts would remain in compression in all but the most severe sea conditions, reducing working of joints and consequent leakage. The hypozomata would also have significantly braced the structure of the trireme against the stresses of ramming, giving it an important advantage in combat. According to material scientist J.E. Gordon: "The hupozoma was therefore an essential part of the hulls of these ships; they were unable to fight, or even to go to sea at all, without it. Just as it used to be the practice to disarm modern warships by removing the breech-blocks from the guns, so, in classical times, disarmament commissioners used to disarm triremes by removing the hupozomata."

=== Dimensions ===
Excavations of the ship sheds (neōsoikoi, νεώσοικοι) at the harbour of Zea in Piraeus, which was the main war harbour of ancient Athens, were first carried out by Dragatsis and Wilhelm Dörpfeld in the 1880s. These have provided us with a general outline of the Athenian trireme. The sheds were ca. 40 m long and just 6 m wide. These dimensions are corroborated by the evidence of Vitruvius, whereby the individual space allotted to each rower was 2 cubits. With the Doric cubit of 0.49 m, this results in an overall ship length of just under 37 m. The height of the sheds' interior was established as 4.026 metres, leading to estimates that the height of the hull above the water surface was ca. 2.15 metres. Its draught was relatively shallow, about 1 metre, which, in addition to the relatively flat keel and low weight, allowed it to be beached easily.

=== Construction ===
The mortise and tenon joint method of hull construction employed in ancient vessels.

Construction of the trireme differed from modern practice. The construction of a trireme was expensive and required around 6,000 man-days of labour to complete. The ancient Mediterranean practice was to build the outer hull first, and the ribs afterwards. To secure and add strength to the hull, cables (hypozōmata) were employed, fitted in the keel and stretched by means of windlasses. Hence the triremes were often called "girded" when in commission.

The materials from which the trireme was constructed were an important aspect of its design. The three principal timbers included fir, pine, and cedar. Primarily the choice in timber depended on where the construction took place. For example, in Syria and Phoenicia, triereis were made of cedar, because pine was not readily available. Pine is stronger and more resistant to decay, but it is heavy, unlike fir, which was used because it was lightweight. The frame and internal structure would consist of pine and fir for a compromise between durability and weight.

Another very strong type of timber is oak; this was primarily used for the hulls of triereis, to withstand the force of hauling ashore. Other ships would usually have their hulls made of pine, because they would usually come ashore via a port or with the use of an anchor. It was necessary to ride the triereis onto the shores because there simply was no time to anchor a ship during war and gaining control of enemy shores was crucial in the advancement of an invading army. (Petersen) The joints of the ship required finding wood that was capable of absorbing water but was not completely dried out to the point where no water absorption could occur. There would be gaps between the planks of the hull when the ship was new, but, once submerged, the planks would absorb the water and expand, thus forming a watertight hull.

Problems would occur, for example, when shipbuilders would use green wood for the hull; when green timber is allowed to dry, it loses moisture, which causes cracks in the wood that could cause catastrophic damage to the ship. The sailyards and masts were preferably made from fir, because fir trees were naturally tall, and provided these parts in usually a single piece. Making durable rope consisted of using both papyrus and white flax; the idea to use such materials is suggested by evidence to have originated in Egypt. In addition, ropes began being made from a variety of esparto grass in the later third century BC.

The use of light woods meant that the ship could be carried ashore by as few as 140 men, but also that the hull soaked up water, which adversely affected its speed and maneuverability. But it was still faster than other warships.

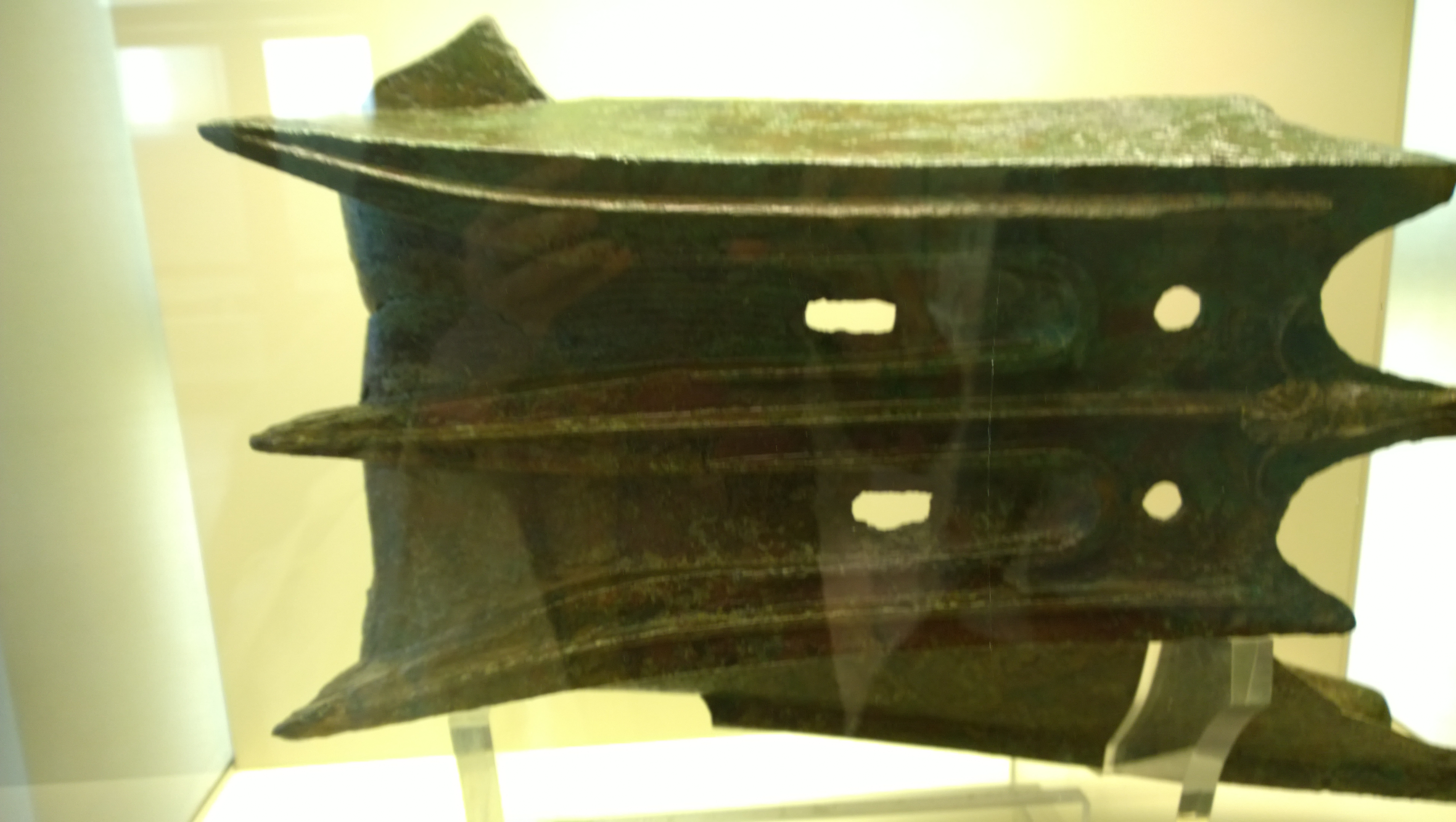
Bronze trireme ram

Once the triremes were seaworthy, it is argued that they were highly decorated with, "eyes, nameplates, painted figureheads, and various ornaments". These decorations were used both to show the wealth of the patrician and to make the ship frightening to the enemy. The home port of each trireme was signaled by the wooden statue of a deity located above the bronze ram on the front of the ship. In the case of Athens, since most of the fleet's triremes were paid for by wealthy citizens, there was a natural sense of competition among the patricians to create the "most impressive" trireme, both to intimidate the enemy and to attract the best oarsmen. Of all military expenditure, triremes were the most labor- and (in terms of men and money) investment-intensive.

=== Propulsion and capabilities ===
The ship's primary propulsion came from the 170 oars (kōpai), arranged in three rows, with one man per oar. Evidence for this is provided by Thucydides, who records that the Corinthian oarsmen carried "each his oar, cushion (hypersion) and oarloop". The ship also had two masts, a main (histos megas) and a small foremast (histos akateios), with square sails, while steering was provided by two steering oars at the stern (one at the port side, one to starboard).

Classical sources indicate that the trireme was capable of sustained speeds of around 6 knots (11 km/h; 6.9 mph) at relatively leisurely oaring. There is also a reference by Xenophon of a single day's voyage from Byzantium to Heraclea Pontica, which translates as an average speed of 7.37 knots (13.65 km/h; 8.48 mph). These figures seem to be corroborated by the tests conducted with the reconstructed Olympias: a maximum speed of 8 knots (15 km/h; 9.2 mph) and a steady speed of 4 knots (7.4 km/h; 4.6 mph) could be maintained, with half the crew resting at a time. Given the imperfect nature of the reconstructed ship, as well as the fact that it was manned by totally untrained modern men and women, it is reasonable to suggest that ancient triremes, expertly built and navigated by trained men, would attain higher speeds.

The distance a trireme could cover in a given day depended much on the weather. On a good day, the oarsmen, rowing for 6–8 hours, could propel the ship between 80–100 kilometres (50–62 mi). There were rare instances, however, when experienced crews and new ships were able to cover nearly twice that distance (Thucydides mentions a trireme travelling 300 kilometres in one day). The commanders of the triremes also had to stay aware of the condition of their men. They had to keep their crews comfortably paced, so as not to exhaust them before battle.

== Crew ==
The total complement (plērōma) of the ship was about 200. These were divided into the 170 rowers (eretai), who provided the ship's motive power, the deck crew headed by the trierarch and a marine detachment. The trierarch would be situated in the rear of the ship, and relay orders to the rest of the crew via the rowmaster. For the crew of Athenian triremes, the ships were an extension of their democratic beliefs. Rich and poor rowed alongside each other. Victor Davis Hanson argues that this "served the larger civic interest of acculturating thousands as they worked together in cramped conditions and under dire circumstances."

During the Peloponnesian War, there were a few variations to the typical crew layout of a trireme. One was a drastically reduced number of oarsmen, so as to use the ship as a troop transport. The thranites would row from the top benches while the rest of the space, below, would be filled with hoplites. In another variation, the Athenians used 10 or so trireme for transporting horses. Such triremes had 60 oarsmen, and rest of the ship was for horses.

The trireme was designed for day-long journeys, with no capacity to stay at sea overnight, or to carry the provisions needed to sustain its crew overnight. Each crewman required 2 gallons (7.6 L) of fresh drinking water to stay hydrated each day, but it is unknown quite how this was stored and distributed. This meant that all those aboard were dependent upon the land and peoples of wherever they landed each night for supplies. Sometimes this would entail traveling up to eighty kilometres in order to procure provisions. In the Peloponnesian War, the beached Athenian fleet was caught unawares on more than one occasion, while out looking for food (Battle of Syracuse and Battle of Aegospotami). Cities visited, which suddenly found themselves needing to provide for large numbers of sailors, usually did not mind the extra business, though those in charge of the fleet had to be careful not to deplete them of resources.

=== Trierarch ===
In Athens, the ship's patron was known as the trierarch (triērarchos). He was a wealthy Athenian citizen (usually from the class of the pentakosiomedimnoi), responsible for manning, fitting out and maintaining the ship for his liturgical year at least; the ship itself belonged to Athens. The triērarchia was one of the liturgies of ancient Athens; although it afforded great prestige, it constituted a great financial burden, so that in the 4th century, it was often shared by two citizens, and after 397 BC it was assigned to special boards.

=== Deck crew ===
The deck and command crew (hypēresia) was headed by the helmsman, the kybernētēs, who was always an experienced seaman and was often the commander of the vessel. These experienced sailors were to be found on the upper levels of the triremes. Other officers were the bow lookout (prōreus or prōratēs), the boatswain (keleustēs), the quartermaster (pentēkontarchos), the shipwright (naupēgos), the piper (aulētēs) who gave the rowers' rhythm and two superintendents (toicharchoi), in charge of the rowers on each side of the ship. What constituted these sailors' experience was a combination of superior rowing skill (physical stamina and/or consistency in hitting with a full stroke) and previous battle experience. The sailors were likely in their thirties and forties. In addition, there were ten sailors handling the masts and the sails.

=== Rowers ===
Depiction of the position and angle of the rowers in a trireme. The form of the parexeiresia, projecting from the deck, is clearly visible.

In the ancient navies, crews were composed not of galley slaves but of free men. In the Athenian case in particular, service in ships was the integral part of the military service provided by the lower classes, the thētai, although metics and hired foreigners were also accepted. Although it has been argued that slaves formed part of the rowing crew in the Sicilian Expedition, a typical Athenian trireme crew during the Peloponnesian War consisted of 80 citizens, 60 metics and 60 foreign hands. Indeed, in the few emergency cases where slaves were used to crew ships, these were deliberately set free, usually before being employed. For instance, the tyrant Dionysius I of Syracuse once set all slaves of Syracuse free to man his galleys, employing thus freedmen, but otherwise relied on citizens and foreigners as oarsmen.

In the Athenian navy, the crews enjoyed long practice in peacetime, becoming skilled professionals and ensuring Athens' supremacy in naval warfare. The rowers were divided according to their positions in the ship into thranitai, zygitai, and thalamitai. According to the excavated Naval Inventories, lists of ships' equipment compiled by the Athenian naval boards, there were:

- 62 thranitai in the top row (thranos means "deck"). They rowed through the parexeiresia, an outrigger which enabled the inclusion of the third row of oars without significant increase to the height and loss of stability of the ship. Greater demands were placed upon their strength and synchronization than on those of the other two rows.
- 54 zygitai in the middle row, named after the beams (zygoi) on which they sat.
- 54 thalamitai or thalamioi in the lowest row, (thalamos means "hold"). Their position was certainly the most uncomfortable, being underneath their colleagues and also exposed to the water entering through the oarholes, despite the use of the askōma, a leather sleeve through which the oar emerged.

Most of the rowers (108 of the 170 – the zygitai and thalamitai), due to the design of the ship, were unable to see the water and therefore, rowed blindly, therefore coordinating the rowing required great skill and practice. It is not known exactly how this was done, but there are literary and visual references to the use of gestures and pipe playing to convey orders to rowers. In the sea trials of the reconstruction Olympias, it was evident that this was a difficult problem to solve, given the amount of noise that a full rowing crew generated. In Aristophanes' play The Frogs two different rowing chants can be found: "ryppapai" and "o opop", both corresponding quite well to the sound and motion of the oar going through its full cycle.

=== Marines ===
A varying number of marines (epibatai), usually 10–20, were carried aboard for boarding actions. At the Battle of Salamis, each Athenian ship was recorded to have 14 hoplites and 4 archers (usually Scythian mercenaries) on board, but Herodotus narrates that the Chiots had 40 hoplites on board at Lade and that the Persian ships carried a similar number. This reflects the different practices between the Athenians and other, less professional navies. Whereas the Athenians relied on speed and maneuverability, where their highly trained crews had the advantage, other states favored boarding, in a situation that closely mirrored the one that developed during the First Punic War. Grappling hooks would be used both as a weapon and for towing damaged ships (ally or enemy) back to shore. When the triremes were alongside each other, marines would either spear the enemy or jump across and cut the enemy down with their swords. As the presence of too many heavily armed hoplites on deck tended to destabilize the ship, the epibatai were normally seated, only rising to carry out any boarding action. The hoplites belonged to the middle social classes, so that they came immediately next to the trierarch in status aboard the ship.

== Tactics ==
In the ancient world, naval combat relied on two methods: boarding and ramming. Artillery in the form of ballistas and catapults was widespread, especially in later centuries, but its inherent technical limitations meant that it could not play a decisive role in combat. The method for boarding was to brush alongside the enemy ship, with oars drawn in, in order to break the enemy's oars and render the ship immobile (which disables the enemy ship from simply getting away), then to board the ship and engage in hand-to-hand combat.

Rams (embola) were fitted to the prows of warships, and were used to rupture the hull of the enemy ship. The preferred method of attack was to come in from astern, with the aim not of creating a single hole, but of rupturing as big a length of the enemy vessel as possible. The speed necessary for a successful impact depended on the angle of attack; the greater the angle, the lesser the speed required. At 60 degrees, 4 knots (7.4 km/h; 4.6 mph) was enough to penetrate the hull, while it increased to 8 knots (15 km/h; 9.2 mph) at 30 degrees. If the target for some reason was in motion in the direction of the attacker, even less speed was required, and especially if the hit came amidships. The Athenians especially became masters in the art of ramming, using light, un-decked (aphraktai) triremes.

In either case, the masts and railings of the ship were taken down prior to engagement to reduce the opportunities for opponents' grappling hooks.

=== On-board forces ===
Unlike the naval warfare of other eras, boarding an enemy ship was not the primary offensive action of triremes. Triremes' small size allowed for a limited number of marines to be carried aboard. During the 5th and 4th centuries, the trireme's strength was in its maneuverability and speed, not its armor or boarding force. That said, fleets less confident in their ability to ram were prone to load more marines onto their ships.

On the deck of a typical trireme in the Peloponnesian War there were 4 or 5 archers and 10 or so marines. These few troops were peripherally effective in an offensive sense, but critical in providing defense for the oarsmen. Should the crew of another trireme board, the marines were all that stood between the enemy troops and the slaughter of the men below. It has also been recorded that if a battle were to take place in the calmer water of a harbor, oarsmen would join the offensive and throw stones (from a stockpile aboard) to aid the marines in harassing/attacking other ships.

=== Naval strategy in the Peloponnesian War ===
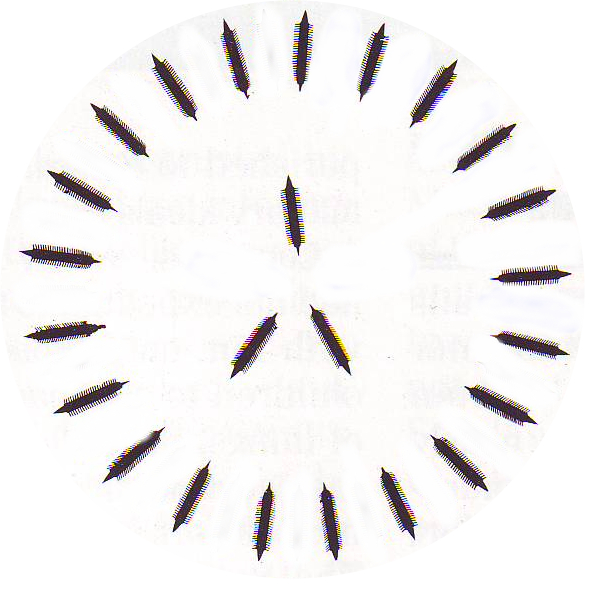
A schematic view of what the circular kyklos formation would have looked like from above.

Squadrons of triremes employed a variety of tactics. The periplous (Gk., "sailing around") involved outflanking or encircling the enemy so as to attack them in the vulnerable rear; the diekplous (Gk., "Sailing out through") involved a concentrated charge so as to break a hole in the enemy line, allowing galleys to break through and then wheel to attack the enemy line from behind; and the kyklos (Gk., "circle") and the mēnoeidēs kyklos (Gk. "half-circle"; literally, "moon-shaped (i.e. crescent-shaped) circle"), were defensive tactics to be employed against these manoeuvres. In all of these manoeuvres, the ability to accelerate faster, row faster, and turn more sharply than one's enemy was very important.

Athens' strength in the Peloponnesian War came from its navy, whereas Sparta's came from its land-based Hoplite army. As the war progressed however the Spartans came to realize that if they were to undermine Pericles' strategy of outlasting the Peloponnesians by remaining within the walls of Athens indefinitely (a strategy made possible by Athens' Long Walls and fortified port of Piraeus), they were going to have to do something about Athens superior naval force. Once Sparta gained Persia as an ally, they had the funds necessary to construct the new naval fleets necessary to combat the Athenians. Sparta was able to build fleet after fleet, eventually destroying the Athenian fleet at the Battle of Aegospotami. The Spartan General Brasidas summed up the difference in approach to naval warfare between the Spartans and the Athenians: "Athenians relied on speed and maneuverability on the open seas to ram at will clumsier ships; in contrast, a Peloponnesian armada might win only when it fought near land in calm and confined waters, had the greater number of ships in a local theater, and if its better-trained marines on deck and hoplites on shore could turn a sea battle into a contest of infantry." In addition, compared to the high-finesse of the Athenian navy (superior oarsmen who could outflank and ram enemy triremes from the side), the Spartans (as well as their allies and other enemies of Athens) would focus mainly on ramming Athenian triremes head on. It would be these tactics, in combination with those outlined by Brasidas, that led to the defeat of the Athenian fleet at the Second Battle of Syracuse during the Sicilian Expedition.

=== Casualties ===
Once a naval battle was under way, for the men involved, there were numerous ways for them to die. Drowning was perhaps the most common way. Once a trireme had been rammed, the ensuing panic that engulfed the men trapped below deck no doubt extended the amount of time it took the men to escape. Inclement weather would greatly decrease the crew's odds of survival, leading to a situation like that off Cape Athos in 411 (12 of 10,000 men were saved). An estimated 40,000 Persians died in the Battle of Salamis. In the Peloponnesian War, after the Battle of Arginusae, six Athenian generals were executed for failing to rescue several hundred of their men clinging to wreckage in the water.

If the men did not drown, they might be taken prisoner by the enemy. In the Peloponnesian War, "Sometimes captured crews were brought ashore and either cut down or maimed – often grotesquely, by cutting off the right hand or thumb to guarantee that they could never row again." The image found on an early-5th-century black-figure, depicting prisoners bound and thrown into the sea being pushed and prodded under water with poles and spears, shows that enemy treatment of captured sailors in the Peloponnesian War was often brutal. Being speared amid the wreckage of destroyed ships was likely a common cause of death for sailors in the Peloponnesian War.

Naval battles were far more of a spectacle than the hoplite battles on land. Sometimes the battles raging at sea were watched by thousands of spectators on shore. Along with this greater spectacle, came greater consequences for the outcome of any given battle. Whereas the average percentage of fatalities from a land battle were between 10 and 15%, in a sea battle, the forces engaged ran the risk of losing their entire fleet. The number of ships and men in battles was sometimes very high. At the Battle of Arginusae for example, 263 ships were involved, making for a total of 55,000 men, and at the Battle of Aegospotami more than 300 ships and 60,000 seamen were involved. In Battle of Aegospotami, the city-state of Athens lost what was left of its navy: the once 'invincible' thalassocracy lost 170 ships (costing some 400 talents), and the majority of the crews were either killed, captured or lost.

== Changes of engagement and construction ==
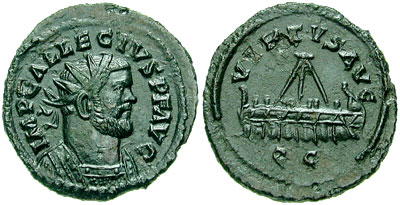
Coin minted by the Romano-Britannic usurper-emperor Allectus (r. 293–296 AD), depicting a trireme on the reverse

During the Hellenistic period, the light trireme was supplanted by larger warships in dominant navies, especially the pentere/quinquereme. The maximum practical number of oar banks a ship could have was three. So the number in the type name did not refer to the banks of oars any more (as for biremes and triremes), but to the number of rowers per vertical section, with several men on each oar. The reason for this development was the increasing use of armour on the bows of warships against ramming attacks, which again required heavier ships for a successful attack. This increased the number of rowers per ship, and also made it possible to use less well-trained personnel for moving these new ships. This change was accompanied by an increased reliance on tactics like boarding, missile skirmishes and using warships as platforms for artillery.

Triremes continued to be the mainstay of all smaller navies. While the Hellenistic kingdoms did develop the quinquereme and even larger ships, most navies of the Greek homeland and the smaller colonies could only afford triremes. They were used by the Diadochi Empires and sea powers like Syracuse, Carthage and later Rome. The difference to the classical 5th century Athenian ships was that they were armoured against ramming and carried significantly more marines. Lightened versions of the trireme and smaller vessels were often used as auxiliaries, and still performed quite effectively against the heavier ships, thanks to their greater manoeuvrability.

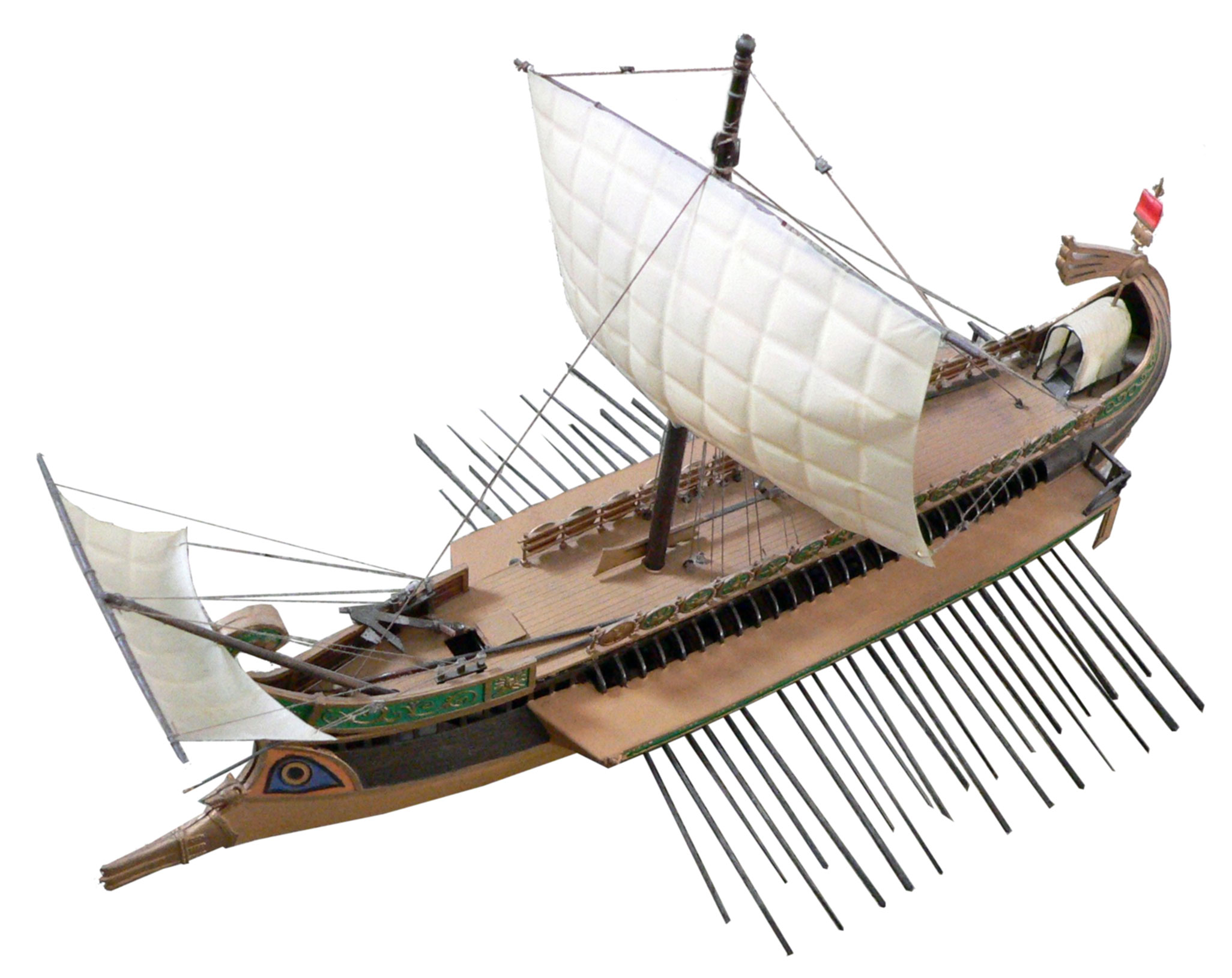
Roman trireme

With the rise of the Roman Empire the biggest fleet of quinqueremes temporarily ruled the Mediterranean, but during the civil wars after Caesar's death the fleet was on the wrong side and a new warfare with light liburnas was developed. By Imperial times, Rome controlled the entirety of the Mediterranean and thus the need to maintain a powerful navy was minimal, as the only enemy they would be facing is pirates. As a result, the fleet was relatively small and had mostly political influence, controlling the grain supply and fighting pirates, who usually employed light biremes and liburnians. But instead of the successful liburnians of the Greek Civil War, it was again centred around light triremes, but still with many marines. Out of this type of ship, the dromon developed.

The Classis Germanica, which guarded the imperial border on the Rhine river, used light river triremes, the Classis Britannica, the Channel Fleet, had the task of logistical movement of personnel and support, and keeping open communication routes across the English Channel.

== Reconstruction ==
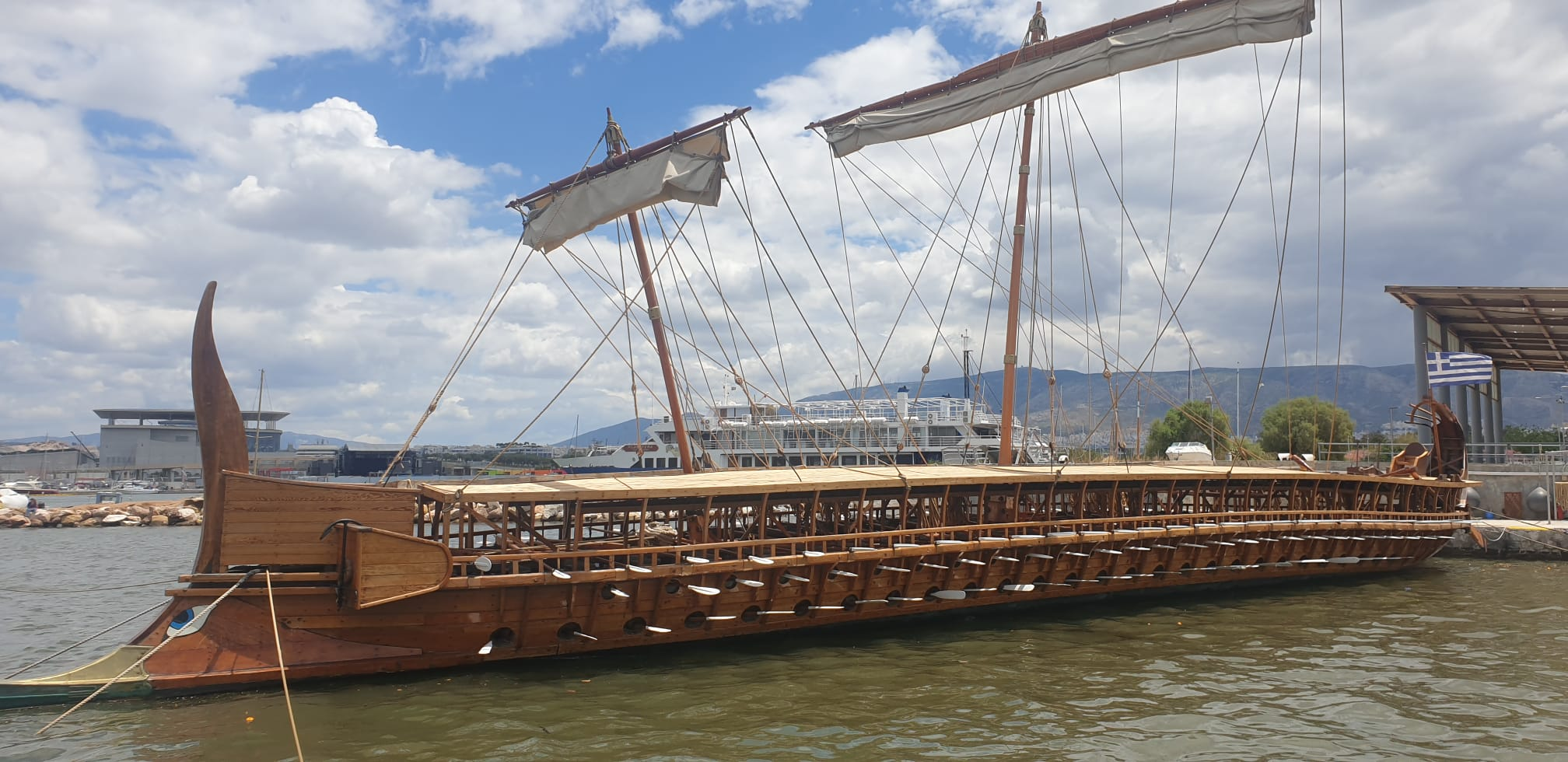
Olympias, a reconstruction of an ancient Athenian trireme

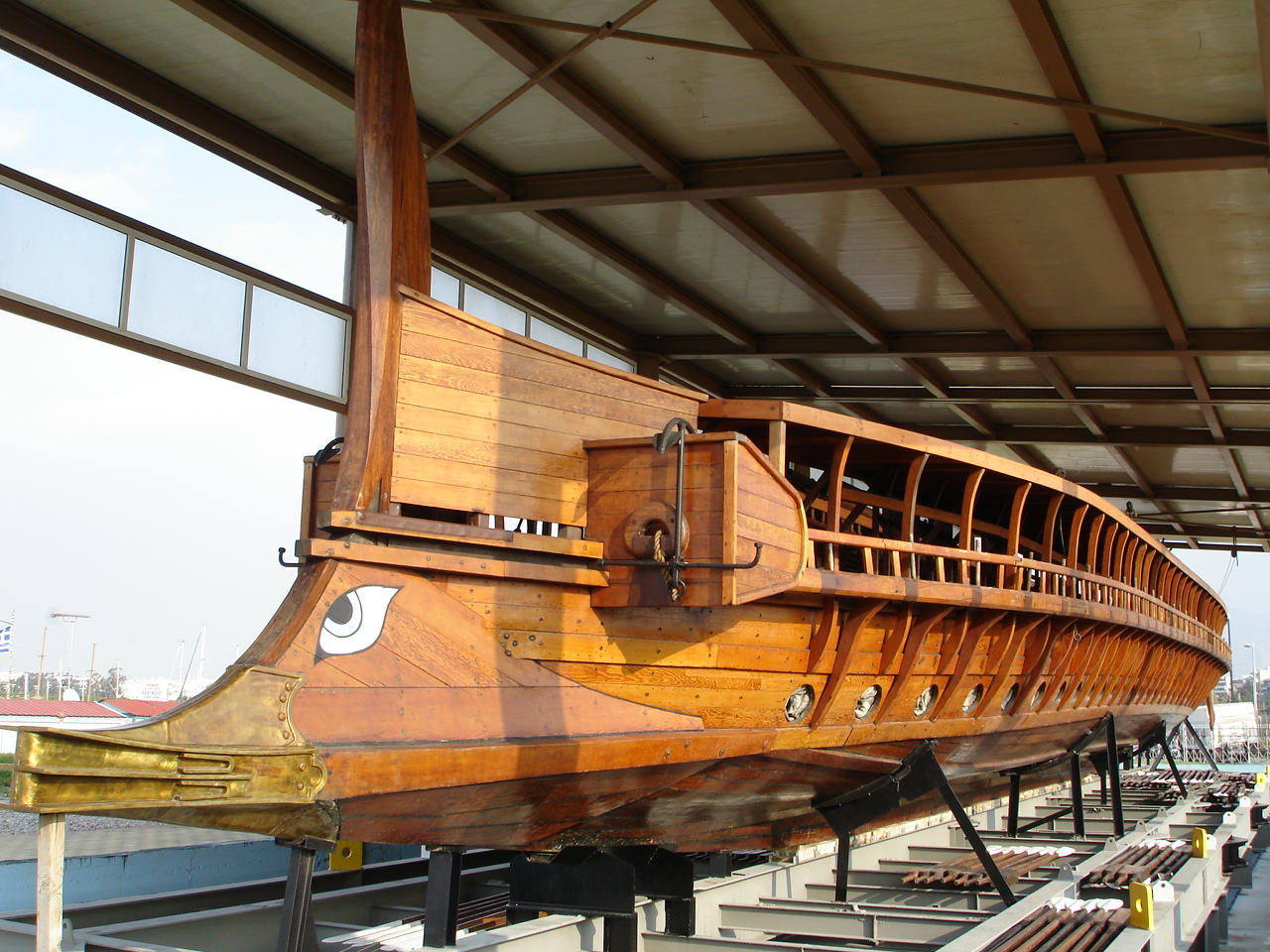
Olympias, a reconstruction of an ancient Athenian trireme

In 1985–1987 a shipbuilder in Piraeus, financed by Frank Welsh (an author, Suffolk banker, writer and trireme enthusiast), advised by historian J. S. Morrison and naval architect John F. Coates (who with Welsh founded the Trireme Trust that initiated and managed the project), and informed by evidence from underwater archaeology, built an Athenian-style trireme, Olympias.

Crewed by 170 volunteer oarsmen, Olympias in 1988 achieved 9 knots (17 km/h; 10 mph). These results, achieved with inexperienced crew, suggest that the ancient writers were not exaggerating about straight-line performance. In addition, Olympias was able to execute a 180 degree turn in one minute and in an arc no wider than two and one half (2.5) ship-lengths. Additional sea trials took place in 1987, 1990, 1992 and 1994. In 2004 Olympias was used ceremonially to transport the Olympic Flame from the port of Keratsini to the main port of Piraeus as the 2004 Olympic Torch Relay entered its final stages in the run-up to the 2004 Summer Olympics opening ceremony.

The builders of the reconstruction project concluded that it effectively proved what had previously been in doubt, i.e., that Athenian triremes were arranged with the crew positioned in a staggered arrangement on three levels with one person per oar. This architecture would have made optimum use of the available internal dimensions. However, since modern humans are on average approximately 6 cm (2 inches) taller than Ancient Greeks (and the same relative dimensions can be presumed for oarsmen and other athletes), the construction of a craft which followed the precise dimensions of the ancient vessel led to cramped rowing conditions and consequent restrictions on the modern crew's ability to propel the vessel with full efficiency, which perhaps explains why the ancient speed records stand unbroken.

== See also ==
- Warship
- Penteconter
- Bireme
