= Olympias (trireme) =

Full-sized reconstruction of an ancient trireme

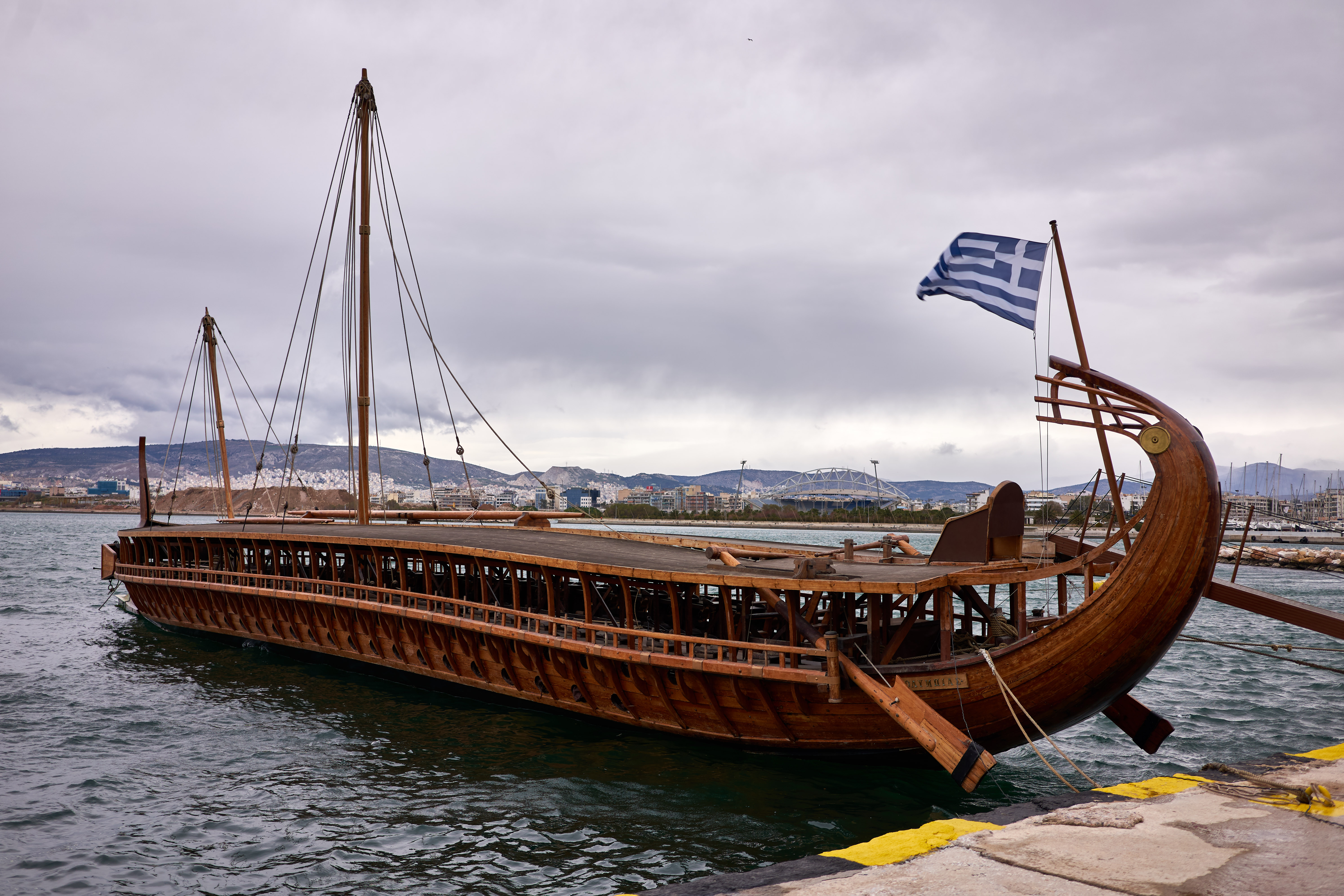

History

Greece
- Name: Olympias
- Owner: Hellenic Navy
- Ordered: 1985
- Laid down: July 27, 1985
- Launched: August 1987
- Commissioned: August 26, 1987
- Home port: Palaio Faliro 37°56.057′N 23°41.11′E
- Status: serves as exhibit in dry dock and used in events

General characteristics
- Type: Trireme
- Displacement: 47 tonnes
- Length: 36.9 m (121 ft 1 in)
- Beam: 5.5 m (18 ft 1 in)
- Draught: 1.25 m (4 ft 1 in)
- Installed power: 88.9hp @ 9 Knots - continuous cruise, as below 31.1hp @ 2.15 knots (Oars only). (Using Gerr Hull Ratio & Required Power)
- Propulsion: Two large square sails; 170 oarsmen
- Speed: Maximum (with oars) over 9 knots (17 km/h; 10 mph); Continuous (crew rowing in turns) 4.0 kilometres per hour (2.5 mph) 2.15 knots (estimated).
- Troops: 14 (10 Hoplites + 4 Archers)
- Complement: 200 including 5 officers (in antiquity)
- Armament: Bronze bow ram, ten spears, four archers

Olympias is a reconstruction of an ancient Athenian trireme and an important example of experimental archaeology. She is also a commissioned ship in the Hellenic Navy of Greece, the only commissioned vessel of its kind in any of the world's navies.

== History ==
Olympias was constructed from 1985 to 1987 by a shipbuilder in Piraeus. She was built to drawings by the naval architect John Coates which he developed through long discussions with the historian John Morrison following the longest correspondence on any subject in The Times in the early 1980s. The work was also advised by the classics teacher Charles Willink and drew on evidence gained from Greek literature, history of art and archaeology above and below water. Finance came from the Hellenic Navy and donors such as Frank Welsh (a banker, writer and trireme enthusiast). Morrison, Coates and Willink founded the Trireme Trust together with Welsh. The Trireme Trust was chaired by Professor Boris Rankov; it was wound up in 2018 and its documents archived at Wolfson College, Cambridge.

The bronze bow ram weighs 200 kg. It is a copy of an original ram now in the Archaeological Museum of Piraeus. The ship was built from Douglas fir with tenons of Virginia oak. The keel is of iroko hardwood.

The important hypozomata (bracing ropes) had to be replaced by a steel rope because no natural fibre or synthetic fibre ropes with about the same elastic modulus as hemp could be obtained for economic reasons. The steel cables' tension varied as the hull bent on the waves, rather than exerting constant tension like a natural fibre rope. This caused the alarming possibility of the rope breaking and endangering the crew, so protective measures had to be taken.

She underwent sea trials in 1987, 1990, 1992 and 1994, but one of the most informative was a 1987 exercise crewed by 170 volunteer rowers. Olympias achieved a speed of 9 knots (17 km/h) and was able to perform 180 degree turns within one minute, in an arc no wider than two and a half (2.5) ship-lengths. These results, achieved with an inexperienced, mixed crew, suggest that ancient historians like Thucydides were not exaggerating about the capabilities of triremes.

Olympias was transported to Britain in 1993, to take part in events celebrating the 2,500 years since the beginning of democracy. In 2004 she was used to transport the Olympic Flame ceremonially from the port of Keratsini to the main port of Piraeus, as the Olympic torch relay approached Athens for the 2004 Summer Olympics.

Olympias is now an exhibit in a dry dock at the Naval Tradition Park in Palaio Faliro, Athens.

In the years 2016 to 2018, a number of trips in the Saronic Gulf were organized, with amateur rowers and passengers.

== Technology ==
The trireme was a fast attack, light displacement vessel. In order to sustain the bending moments of her considerable length, tightened ropes (hypozomata) were mounted beneath the deck spanning from bow to stern. This was an ingenious way to increase rigidity of the hull. Today in modern construction it is called pre-tensioning. After every trip the triremes were pulled ashore in special slides and the hypozomata were re-tightened.

The trireme hulls were constructed from planks with closely spaced and pegged mortise and tenon joints. When these are fitted carefully the hull can carry shear stresses well and stay watertight.

It was estimated that her ramming speed should have been in excess of 16 knots (30 km/h), something the present reconstruction could not achieve, possibly because it was overweight.

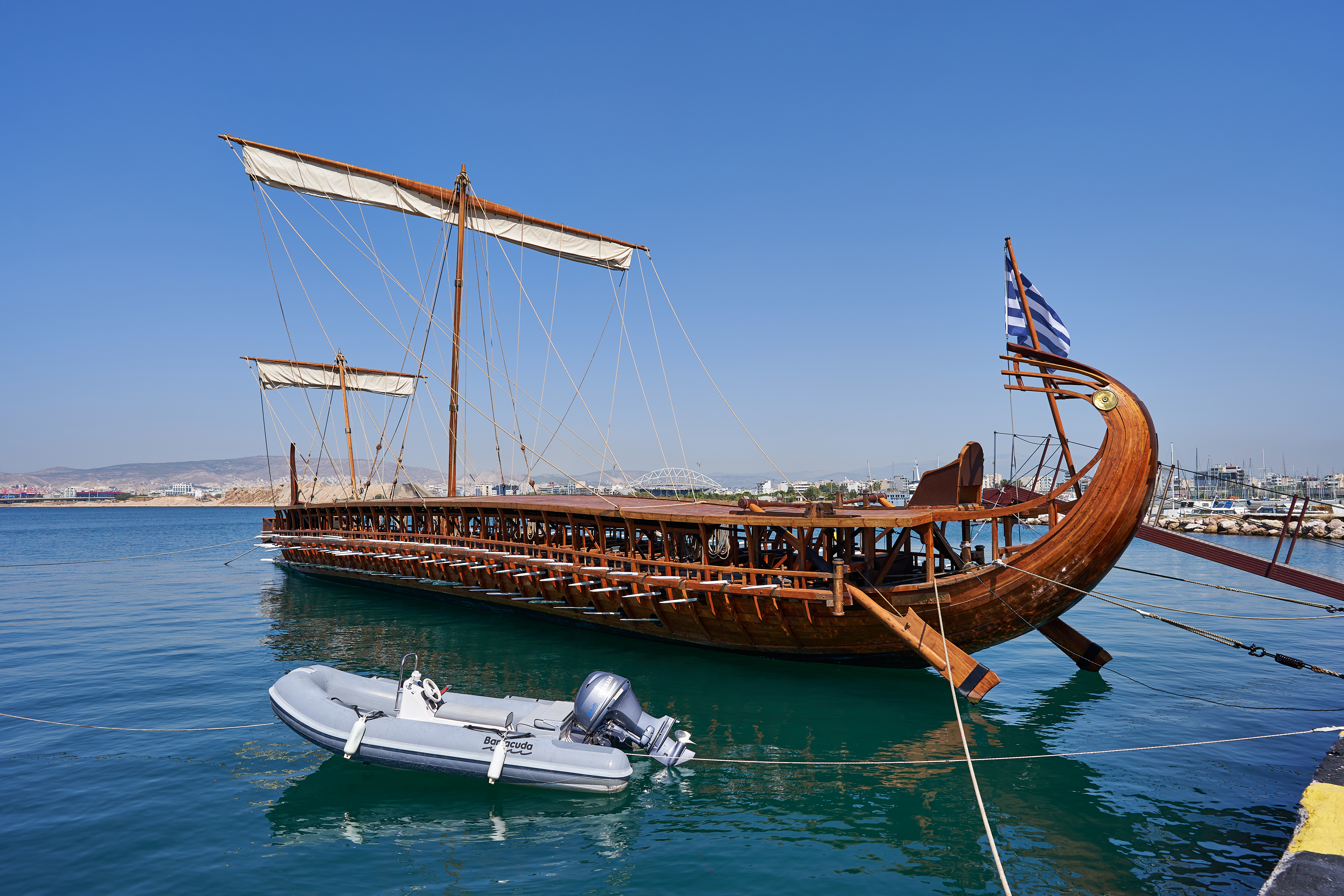
Trireme near a modern boat

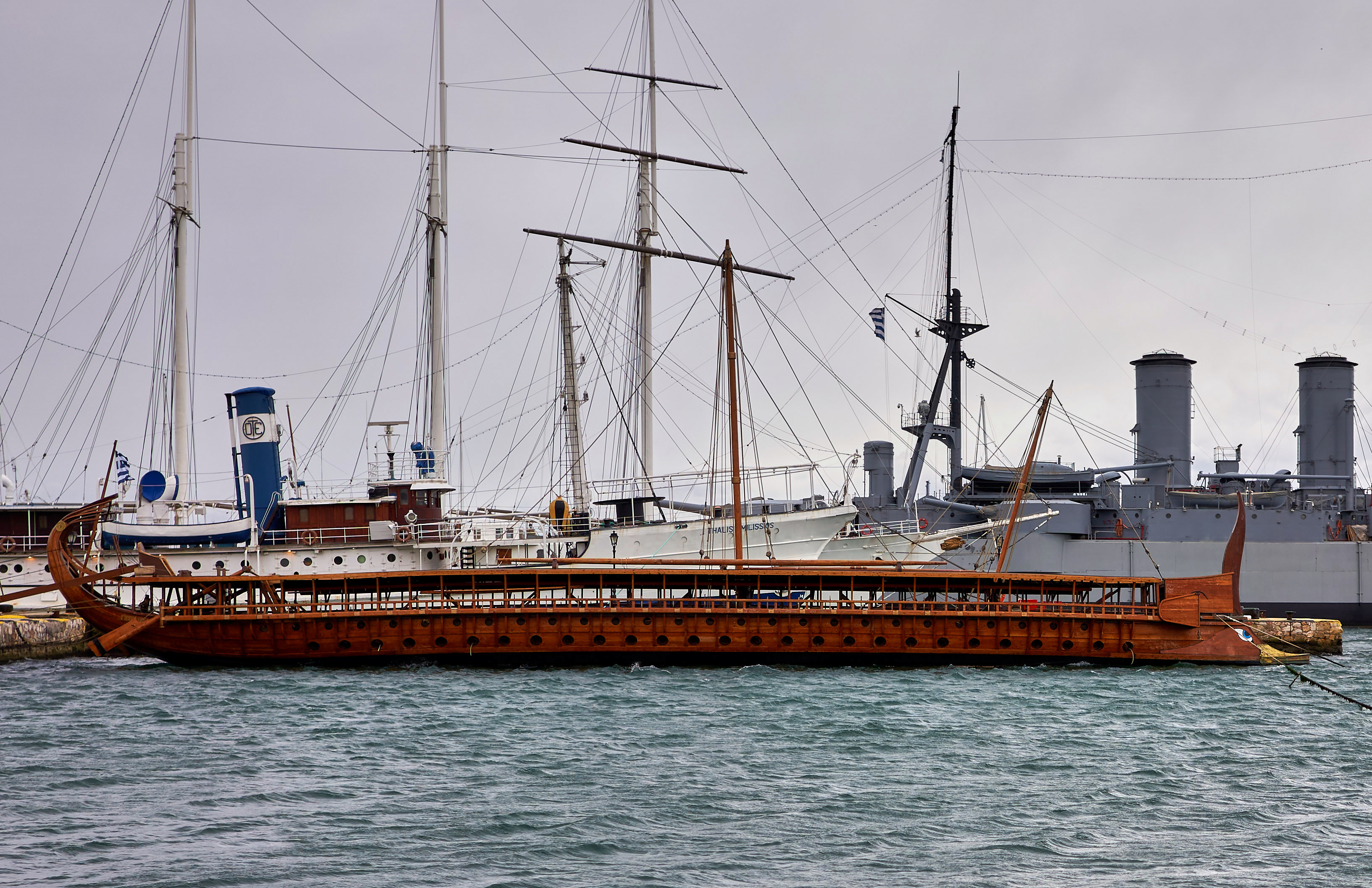

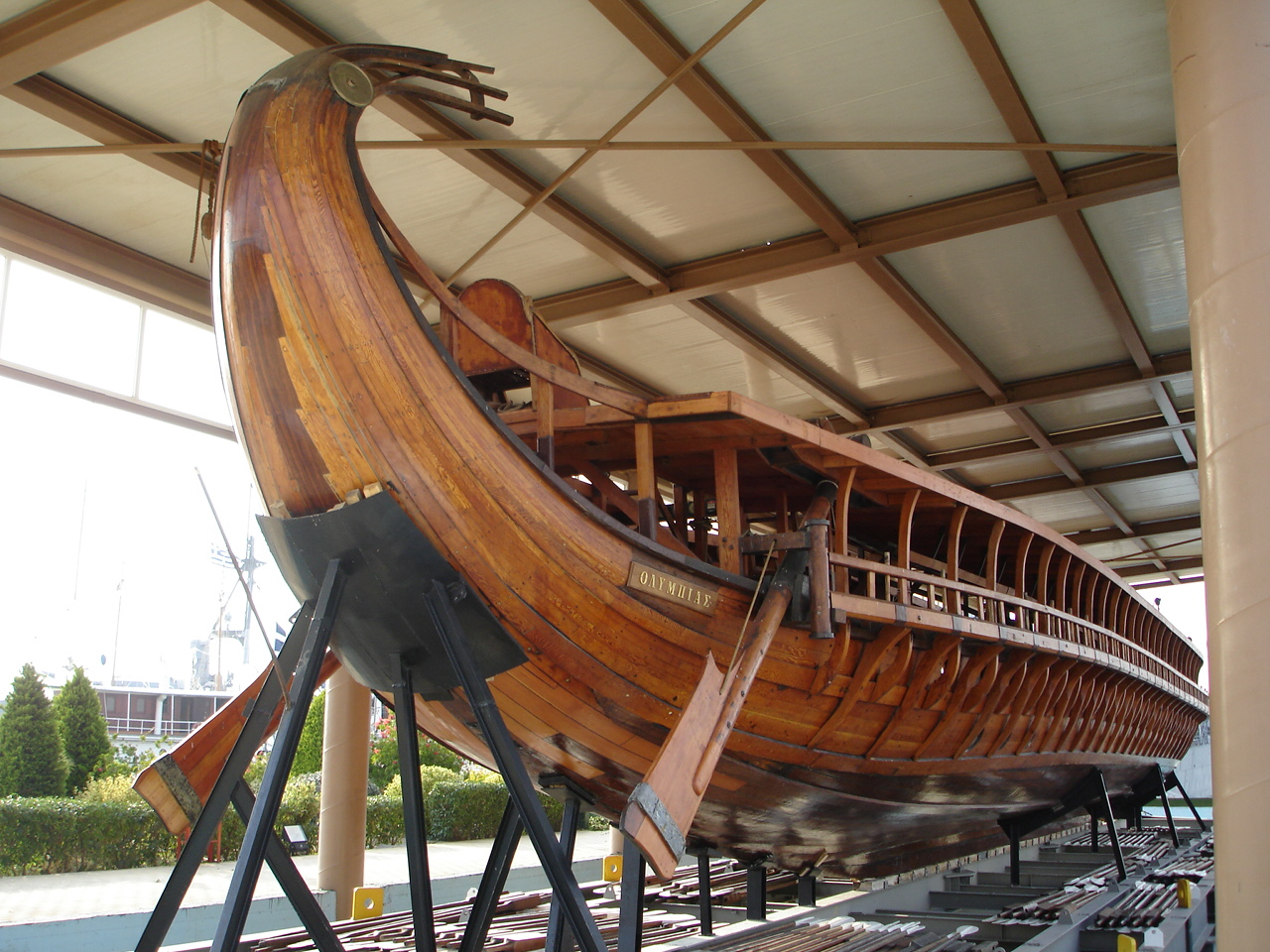

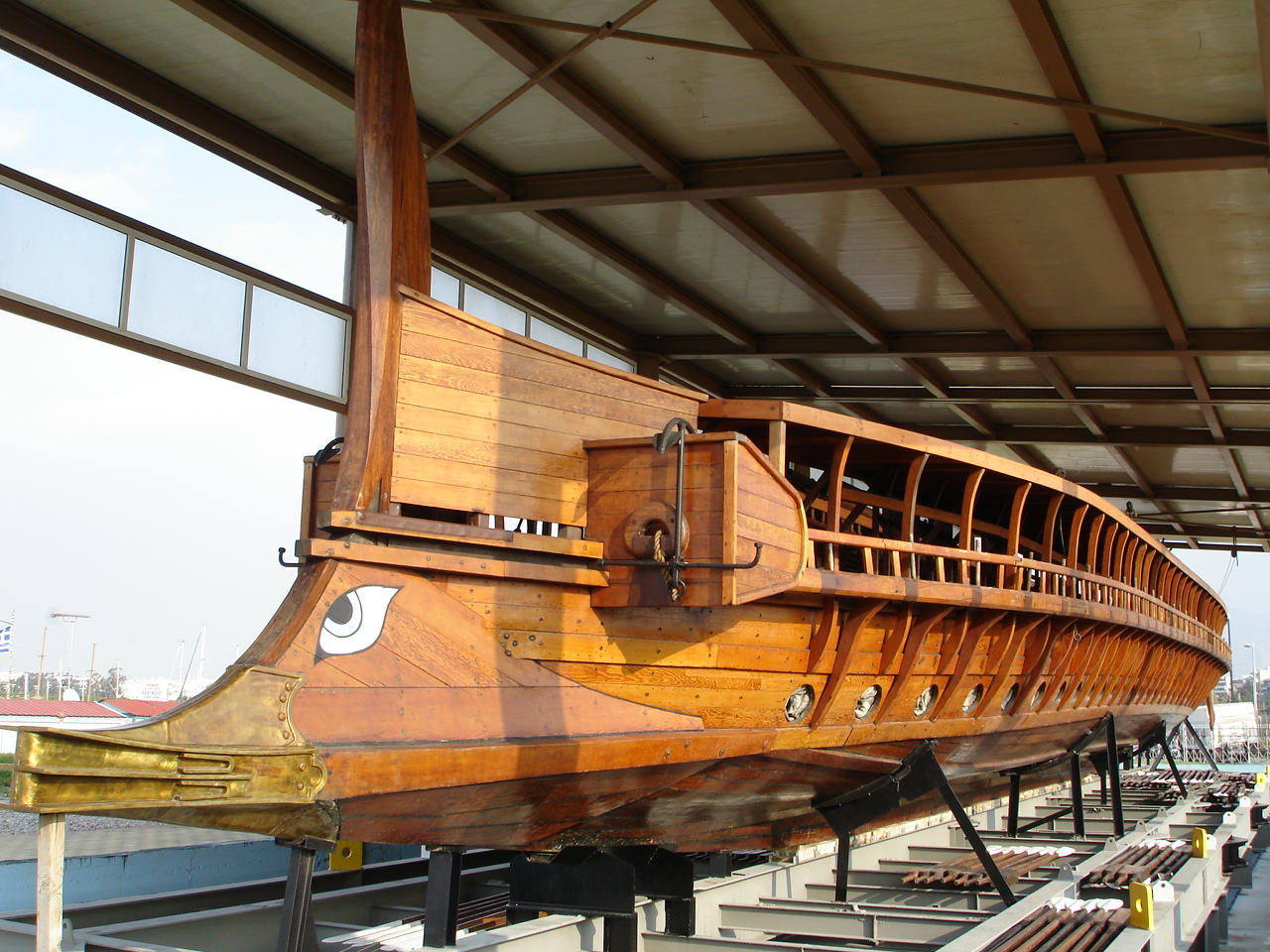
Olympias in its shed in the Naval Tradition Park, Palaio Faliro

== Crew ==
A trireme of the classical period would have had a crew of 200, including five officers. This would be made up of:

- trierarchos (τριήραρχος "commander of trireme") — the commanding officer, responsible for supporting the ship
- kybernetes (κυβερνήτης: κυβερνάω "steer") — executive officer, responsible for the cruising safety
- keleustes (κελευστής: κελεύω "command") — responsible for the training and morale of the crew
- pentekontarchos (πεντηκόνταρχος "commander of fifty") — administration officer
- prorates (πρῳράτης: πρῷρα "prow") — bow officer, responsible for keeping a sharp lookout
- 1 auletes (αὐλητής: αὐλός "flute") — a musician supplying the oar timing with his flute
- 170 eretai (ἐρέται, oarsmen) in three banks
  - 62 thranitai (θρανῖται, singular θρανίτης: θρᾶνος "bench") — the upper bank
  - 54 zygitai (ζυγῖται, singular ζυγίτης: ζυγός "yoke", "rowing-bench") — the middle bank
  - 54 thalamitai (θαλαμῖται, singular θαλαμίτης: θάλαμος "inner chamber") — lower bank
- 10 sailors for handling the sails
- 14 epibatai (ἐπιβάται, marines, literally "passengers") - 10 spearmen and 4 archers

== See also ==
- Havhingsten fra Glendalough, a modern reconstruction of a Viking longship.
- Ivlia, а modern reconstruction of ancient Greek bireme.
