= Geoffrey E. Coates =

English organometallic chemist

Geoffrey Edward Coates
- Born: 17 May 1917; London, England
- Died: 10 January 2013 (aged 95); Laramie, Wyoming, U.S.
- Education: Queen's College, Oxford B.Sc. (1939), M.A. University of Bristol D.Sc. (1954)
- Scientific career
- Fields: Inorganic Chemistry, Organometallic Chemistry
- Workplaces: University of Wyoming; Durham University; University of Bristol
- Notable students: Richard A. Andersen

Geoffrey Edward Coates (14 May 1917 – 10 January 2013) was a British organometallic chemist and academic. He was an accomplished organometallic chemist.

During his career, he was a professor at Durham University, the University of Bristol, and head of the chemistry department at the University of Wyoming. Coates is known for contributions to the organometallic chemistry of beryllium, as well as authorship of the seminal textbook Organometallic Compounds.

== Early life and education ==
Coates was born in London, England on 14 May 1917 to chemists Joseph and Ada Coates. He and his younger brother John F. Coates, attended school at Clifton College, Bristol, while his father taught chemistry as a Professor at Swansea University. During this time, Coates attended lectures by J. J. Thomson and James Chadwick’s seminar announcing the discovery of the neutron in 1932. In 1935, Coates was awarded a scholarship to study chemistry at the Queen's College of the University of Oxford. He received his B.Sc. with First Class Honours in Chemistry in 1939. Coates went on to earn his M.Sc. in chemistry also from Oxford, conducting research with physical chemist Leslie Ernest Sutton on the thermochemistry and dipole moment studies of aromatic organic compounds. He also co-authored a paper with his father, Joseph E. Coates, on the dielectric constant of hydrogen cyanide.

== War years ==
During World War II, Coates worked in the research department of the Magnesium Metal Corporation in Swansea. There he worked on high-energy substances (such as flares, explosives, and bomb disposal), and also developed an interest in electrochemistry. His early papers included construction of electrochemical apparatuses, a determination of the standard electrode potential of magnesium and studies on the acid and alkaline corrosion of magnesium and its alloys.

== Post-war career ==
In 1945, Coates accepted a lecturer position in inorganic chemistry at the University of Bristol, where he received his D. Sc. degree in 1954. At Bristol, Coates shifted his research focus towards inorganic and organometallic chemistry, publishing on dimethylberyllium and its reactivity with Lewis bases, and the reactivity of trimethylgallium. Beginning in 1953, Coates was Professor of Chemistry and later Departmental Chairman at the Durham University. During the next 15 years, Coates transformed a small, fragmented department with few facilities for research and teaching laboratories in assorted buildings, into a diverse and highly productive department housed in a modern building he designed, staffed and equipped. As of 2021, Durham University's chemistry department ranks in the top five in the U.K., according to the Complete University Guide.

In 1958, Coates was asked by Methuen Publishing to write a monograph on organometallic compounds. Organometallic Compounds was followed by a significantly larger 2nd edition in 1960, and due to rapid expansion of the field of organometallic chemistry, an even larger text with Malcolm L.H. Green and Kenneth Wade was subsequently written in 1967. This last edition, in two volumes, remains a foundational work in organometallic chemistry, has been translated into numerous languages, and was the standard text used by colleges throughout the world for 20 years.

== University of Wyoming ==
In 1968, Coates assumed the role as Head of the Chemistry Department at the University of Wyoming. At Wyoming, Coates worked exclusively on the organometallic chemistry of beryllium, and had only one Ph.D. student, Richard A. Andersen. Coates also was known for his dynamic style of lecturing on general chemistry, which included chemistry demonstrations.

In 1979, Coates retired early from the University of Wyoming due to health issues, but recovered and was active as an Emeritus Professor in the Chemistry Department. Coates regularly attended lectures in both chemistry and geology. The University of Wyoming established the Coates Teaching Assistant Award in 1980 in recognition of his dedication to undergraduate education, and the Geoffrey Coates Inorganic Lectureship in 1987 in recognition for the substantial impact of his career in chemistry. Coates became a member of the American Chemical Society in 1989.

== Personal life ==
Coates married W. Jean Hobbs while she was a medical student at Bristol in 1951, and their daughter Helen was born just after her mother qualified. Their son Peter was born in Durham. Coates is survived by four grandchildren and three great-grandchildren.

Coates enjoyed photography, metalworking, and taking camping trips in the Wyoming mountains. In his seventies, Coates began exploring the ocean by booking extended trips on commercial freighters, first across the Atlantic and later to Southeast Asia, New Zealand, Indonesia, Malaysia, and Fiji. He took a final voyage to South America; after that the freighters stopped allowing him passage after the age of 80. He died at home in Laramie, Wyoming, on January 10, 2013, at age 95.
