= John Coates (naval architect) =

British naval architect (1922–2010)

John Francis Coates, OBE, RCNC (30 March 1922 – 10 July 2010) was a British naval architect best known for his work on the study of construction of the Ancient Greek trireme. His research led to the construction of the first working replica of triremes, the fastest and most devastating warship of Classical Mediterranean empires, and gave a greater understanding of how they were built and used. He also carried out research into the use of shipping in Northern Europe during the Bronze Age, in particular the Ferriby Bronze Age boat and the Dover Boat.

== Early life ==
Coates was born and raised in Swansea, the son of chemists Ada and Joseph Edward Coates, Professor of Chemistry at the University College of Swansea. He was educated at Clifton College and took Engineering Science at The Queen's College, Oxford.

== Career ==
Coates joined the Royal Corps of Naval Constructors in 1943. He saw sea service on the Arctic convoys. After the war, he continued to work in the Admiralty. He had a period of service in the Royal Dockyard, Chatham. An early project was the design of new inflatable life jackets and life rafts for which he was appointed OBE in 1955.

From 1957, Coates was the naval architect for the County-class destroyers design. This design involved the new challenges of incorporating a large new Seaslug guided missile system, gas turbine and steam propulsion, advanced NBCD arrangements along with increased system complexity into a destroyer concept.

Coates attended the Royal College of Defence Studies in 1971. In 1974 he was appointed superintendent of Naval Construction Research Establishment (NCRE) in Dunfermline.

Coates was appointed as Chief Naval Architect in 1977, a post he remained in until his retirement in 1979.

== Life-saving development ==
At the end of the Second World War a committee under Admiral Talbot was set up to consider what had caused the death of so many RN personnel who escaped from sinking ships during the war and to make proposals for future life-saving methods. They found that most survivors of the actual sinking died of exposure, i.e. loss of body heat, in the water. In the cold of the Arctic most would die within a few minutes and even in temperate waters it was only a matter of hours. To make matters worse, the standard life jacket did nothing to prevent the head of an unconscious man from dropping into the water, so drowning himself. The Carley floats, used to help keep men afloat, were difficult to launch from a sinking ship, and provided no shelter. The basic problem was that there was no department with any responsibility for the either life-saving policy or equipment.

After the Talbot Committee's report the material aspects were taken on Director of Naval Construction department. Coates was given control of the detail. It was realised that inflatable life-rafts, similar to those used by the RAF, and proper life-jackets (which would cost no more than £5!) were needed.

The new life-jacket selected after a competition among the authorities represented on the committee was that designed by Coates. Being of tall and thin build said to be the most difficult to keep stable and face uppermost, it feel to Coates himself to test it in rough and cold weather, as well as jumping with it fully inflated from a height of 10 metres into water to prove that wearers would not break their necks when abandoning aircraft carriers. For his work, Coates received an OBE in 1955.

== County class destroyer ==
In 1955, Coates was tasked with the design of the new County-class destroyer. The design was extremely challenging, combining the very large new Seaslug missile system with a new gas turbine propulsion system into a destroyer. The original design had been for a 15,000 ton cruiser. At the directive of Lord Mountbatten it had to be slimmed down to a destroyer of typically 6,000 tons.

The design raised novel layout challenges. Coates wrote:

"To carry enough missiles to justify the cost of even the smaller ship, the missile magazine had to be extended over all the propelling machinery spaces, right through the middle of the ship, high in the hull.

The design became volume determined, around the rigid spatial framework of the Seaslug system and storage spaces. The latter had also caused the other ships spaces to be zoned in function horizontally instead of vertically, which is more usual and convenient in warships and merchant ships alike.

To keep the ship to a size responding to Lord Mountbatten's directive, demand by specialist interests within the Admiralty had to be strictly controlled, and often curtailed."

This large and intrusive Seaslug missile system raised system complexity issues that needed to be addressed in the design phase. Coates wrote:

"The designers decided to integrate the design in more detail than previously attempted, before working drawings were developed by the lead shipbuilder. Particular attention was given to ship's services to ensure not only their proper design but also that they would run without expensive congestion or complication, and without interfering with equipment, structures of free passage of personnel.

Early drawings showing all services were made, so that likely interferences could be identified and resolved. In particular, considerable effort was made by Hutchins and his team to develop a new, and simplified, electrical drawing presentation which also enabled every electrical cable in the ship to be uniquely numbered for the first time.

It then became clear that the whole arrangement of the ship, services and internal movement, as well as it structure, survivability and protection from nuclear attack could be improved at negligible cost if the main hull was increased by one deck over most of its length, much increasing the number of missiles which could be stowed. At the same time the superstructure could be reduced to those features which by function must be above the main hull, with the single exception of the officer's accommodation.

The Class became the first modern escort to follow aircraft carriers in minimising superstructure; possibly because the both had hangar like stowages with them. This change enabled the Operations Room to be accommodated well down in the hull, a position often since advocated in many navies but rarely achieved. The more capacious hull together with firm control of the design details enable to exterior of the ship to be kept exceptionally simple and uncluttered."

The Seaslug missile system also raised significant and new ship safety issues. Coates wrote:

"Such a radical departure in the stowage of explosives in HM Ships called for the introduction of a constantly pressurised and automatic water spray system, and other new safety measures and devices offset the lack of armour protection inherent in the destroyer concept."

The design innovated by incorporating gas turbine propulsion. Early gas turbines had very high fuel consumption, and the Engineer-in-Chief proposed using them in addition to a conventional steam turbine plant as a boost for top speed (COSAG).

== Trireme reconstruction ==
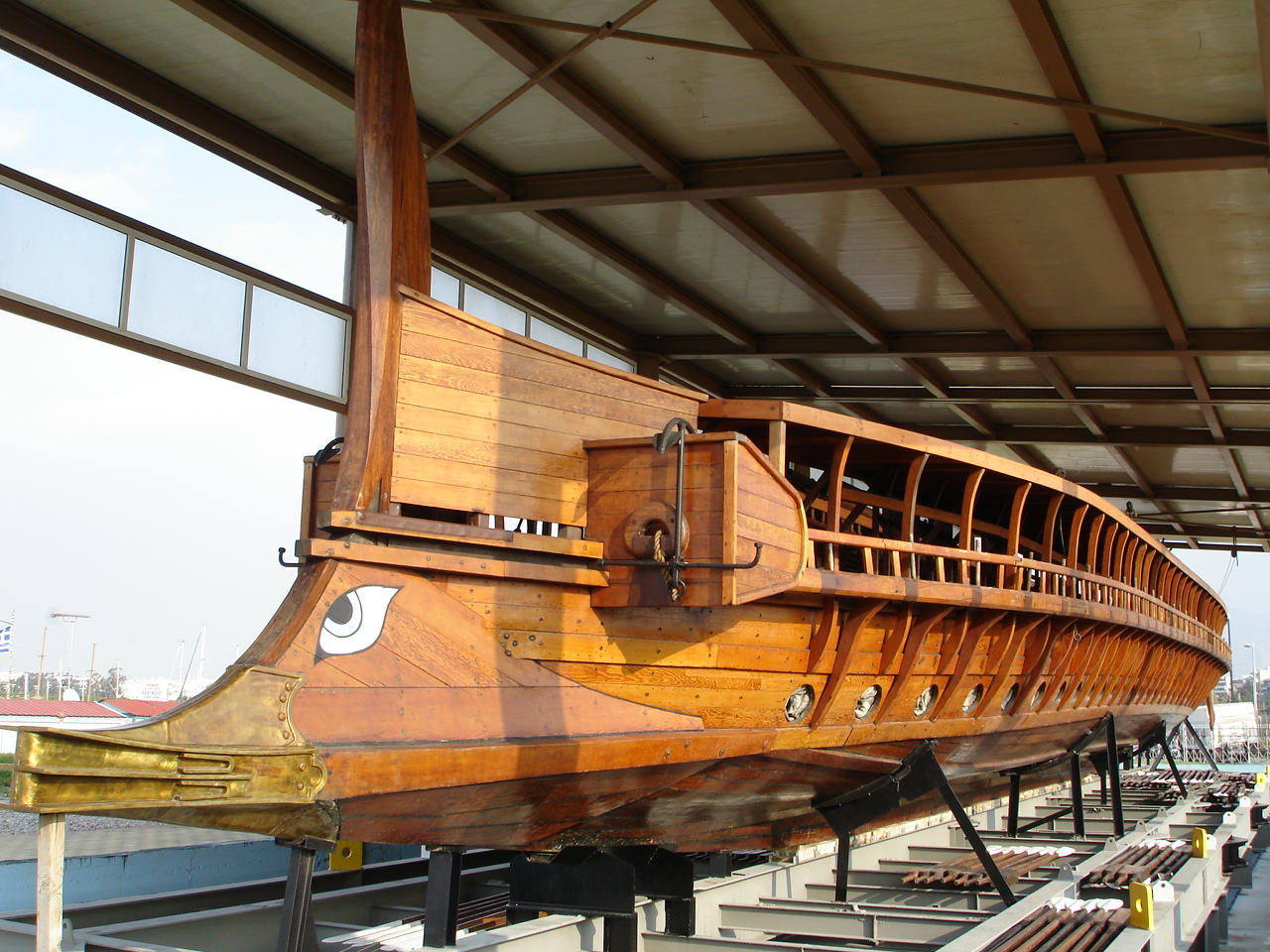
Olympias, a reconstruction of an ancient Athenian trireme

In 1982 he was approached by Professor John Morrison of Wolfson College, Cambridge to assist with research into the design of the trireme. Together they and others founded the Trireme Trust, and created a series of scale models and a full scale cross section based on historical records, archaeological evidence and the science of naval architecture. Coates developed a complete design, encompassing more than 40 sheets of plans and 100 pages of specifications, which enabled the construction of a full-scale replica, the Olympias, funded by the Greek government's Ministries of Defense and Tourism in 1987. Coates oversaw the accuracy of the construction, including the manner in which the hull shell was held together by 20,000 pinned mortise-and-tenon joints. In 1989, he was awarded an Honorary Degree (Doctor of Science) by the University of Bath. He also researched the archaeological remains of Bronze Age seagoing ships in Northern Europe, exploring their seaworthiness.

== Personal life ==
Coates married Jane Waymouth in 1954, she predeceased him in 2008. He died on 10 July 2010, leaving two sons and five granddaughters. Coates' elder brother, chemist Geoffrey E. Coates, died in Laramie, Wyoming, in 2013.
