= Frank Welsh (writer) =

British historian (1931–2023)

Frank Reeson Welsh (16 August 1931 – 23 April 2023) was a British historian, novelist and international banker.

== Life and career ==
Welsh was born on 16 August 1931. He graduated from Magdalene College, Cambridge, and retired after a successful banking career. He wrote extensively on imperial British history, notably Hong Kong, Australia and South Africa.

Welsh died on 23 April 2023, at the age of 91.

== Bibliography ==
- The History of the World: from the Dawn of Humanity to the modern age., London: Quercus, 2013.
- The Battle for Christendom: The Council of Constance, 1415, and the Struggle to Unite Against Islam, London: Constable, 2008.
- Great Southern Land: A New History of Australia, London : Allen Lane, 2004.
- The Four Nations: A History of the United Kingdom, London: HarperCollins, 2002.
- Dangerous Deceits: The Secrets of Apartheid's Corrupt Bankers, London : HarperCollins, 1999.
- South Africa: A Narrative History, New York: Kodansha America, 1999.
- A History of South Africa, London : HarperCollins, 1998.
- The Companion Guide to the Lake District, London: Companion Guides, 1997.
- A Borrowed Place: The History of Hong Kong, New York: Kodansha America, 1993.
- A History of Hong Kong, London: HarperCollins, 1993.
- Building a Trireme, London: Constable, 1988. - on the construction of the Olympias
- Uneasy City: An Insider's View of the City of London, London: Weidenfeld & Nicolson, 1986.
- Bend'Or, Duke of Westminster : A Personal Memoir, London: Robin Clark, 1985; with a foreword by Anne Grosvenor, Duchess of Westminster, authored with George Ridley.
- First blood: Tales of Horror from the Border Country, London : Constable, 1985.
- The Afflicted State: A Survey of Public Enterprise, London: Century Pub., 1983.
- The Profit of the State: Nationalised Industries and Public Enterprises, London: Temple Smith, 1982.
