= Croydon North by-election =

Croydon North by-election may refer to one of three parliamentary by-elections held in the British House of Commons constituency of Croydon North:

- 1940 Croydon North by-election
- 1948 Croydon North by-election
- 2012 Croydon North by-election

See also

- Croydon North (UK Parliament constituency)
