= Bill Pitt (politician) =

British politician

William Henry Pitt

Member of Parliament for Croydon North West
- In office 22 October 1981 – 13 May 1983
- Preceded by: Robert Taylor
- Succeeded by: Humfrey Malins

Personal details
- Born: 17 July 1937 Brixton Hill, London, England
- Died: 17 November 2017 (aged 80) Margate, England
- Party: Labour
- Other political affiliations: Liberal Party (until 1988); Liberal Democrats (1988–96)
- Spouse: Janet Pitt
- Children: 1
- Education: South Bank Polytechnic (Lighting Engineer); Polytechnic of North London (Classics & Philosophy)

William Henry Pitt (17 July 1937 – 17 November 2017) was a British politician. A Liberal Member of Parliament between 1981 and 1983, he was the first candidate elected to Parliament under the banner of the SDP–Liberal Alliance.

== Early life ==
Pitt was born on Brixton Hill, South London in 1937. His family later moved to Upper Norwood, where he attended Heath Clark School, followed by the London Nautical School and South Bank Polytechnic where he studied to be a Lighting Engineer. He spent some time in Wales working on a farm and learning to play the tuba, prior to his National Service in the Royal Army Service Corps. His initial political allegiance was to the Conservatives; he was Chairman of South Norwood Young Conservatives from 1959 to 1960. He joined the Liberal Party in the 1960s. He had a keen interest in theatre and music from his teens onwards, and was offered a place in Leslie Crowther's Repertory Company aged 16, which he was unable to take up. He had an abiding love for and interest in France, French film and French language engendered by his teacher Arthur Birtles; French was his second language. The rest of his education did not match up to Mr Birtles' standards, but his passion for learning and self-education continued throughout his life.

== Liberal politics ==
In the 1970s, Pitt worked as a local government officer for Lambeth London Borough Council. Whilst working as an Environmental Health Officer in the Mayall & Railton Roads Housing Action Area of Brixton he became Chair of Lambeth NALGO. He stood as Liberal candidate for Croydon North West in February 1974 obtaining 23% of the vote. He stood again in the October election, but this time, the vote for most Liberal Candidates declined, including his own. In the 1979 general election he, like 60% of Liberal candidates in London and 50% overall, lost his deposit. He also unsuccessfully fought the London South seat at the 1979 European Parliament elections.

However, he was popular within the party and served as Chairman of the London Liberal Party and as a member of the Liberal Party National Executive Committee and the Party Council from 1977 until 1981. He took on the editorship of Radical Bulletin following Peter Hain's move to Labour. Pitt unsuccessfully stood for the Greater London Council seat of Brent East in 1977 and Croydon North West in 1981.

== By-election ==
When the Conservative MP Robert Taylor died, who had represented Croydon North-West since 1970, Pitt was quickly chosen as the prospective Liberal candidate for the following by-election. As a bearded local government officer, Pitt looked more like a stereotypical Liberal Party member, unrepresentative of the newly formed Social Democratic Party, which was working in alliance with the Liberals. The choice of Pitt as by-election candidate was resisted by some senior members of the party, who were keen to give the SDP a chance to win its first Parliamentary election (potentially with a big name like Shirley Williams as the candidate), but Pitt and the local Liberal Association were insistent, and there was no way to force them to cede the candidature. He had "nursed" the seat since 1974 and was the approved Candidate at national, regional and local level. Considerable pressure was put on the CNW Committee, especially on Alan Mead—Chairman at the time—who was also at the time Chair of Croydon CHE (which prompted a Guardian article entitled "the queering of Croydon"), as well as the Regional Party. The Liberal Party Council of 17 July 1981 further endorsed Pitt and thus put an end to any speculation or manipulation.

Pitt was elected at the Croydon North West by-election on 22 October 1981 with a majority of 3,254 (standing as "Liberal with SDP support"). During the campaign, posters summed up the relationship between the two parties as "The Alliance" and the term stuck as the official name thereafter, although it had originally been intended as a stopgap slogan. Pitt's was the first in a sequence of SDP-Liberal by-election victories during the period when support for the Labour Party was at a low ebb. Pitt's win delighted Liberal leader David Steel who said after the result was known that the party had won a greater majority than they had expected. Pitt himself claimed that his victory showed that the Alliance had "caught the imagination of the voters" and that as consequence there were "no longer any safe seats for Tory or Labour in the country."

== Parliament ==
He served in the House of Commons as Liberal Home Affairs Spokesman and led for the Alliance throughout the first Police and Criminal Evidence Bill, which fell when Margaret Thatcher called a general election. Pitt lost his seat to the Conservative, Humfrey Malins, in the 1983 general election. He fought two further elections for the Liberals in South Thanet in 1987 and 1992.

== Later career ==
Taking a break from campaigning, Bill took a degree in Classics and Philosophy at Polytechnic of North London, graduating with a BA in 1987, achieving his long-held wish. Like many of his generation and class from South London, his education was generally poor, and he left school at 16 with one O Level in spite of his clear intelligence.

Bill and his wife Janet moved to Broadstairs in 1988, becoming quickly involved in the local community. In 1996, Pitt joined the Labour Party, disillusioned with the Liberal Democrats (which had been formed by the merger of the Alliance parties) and concerned with preventing Jonathan Aitken holding his seat in Thanet South. He campaigned for Labour in Thanet and for Malcolm Wicks in Croydon North in the 1997 general election.

He retired from full-time employment in August 2003, having been Head of Training for the Canary Wharf Group, where he set up a Construction Apprenticeship Programme, initiating and embedding a training programme for all staff; he well understood the value of lifelong learning to improve personal wellbeing and improve society.

In 2005, he became editor of the Norwood Review, the newsletter of the Norwood Society.

Following retirement, he became Chairman of the Occupational Pensioners Alliance. He was a member of the Methodist Church for over 55 years and was latterly Senior Steward for Canterbury & East Kent Methodist Circuit. He became a senior member of the Academy FM Thanet news team after joining the station in 2013, and was a helpful mentor to less experienced colleagues. Pitt loved radio and the opportunities it gave him to interview politicians, alongside local and international artists (including Grayson Perry, a favourite) as well as highlighting community activity.

His hobbies included photography, while music was a lifelong enthusiasm: his tastes embraced folk, classical, jazz and many more recent genres, including punk. He sang in choirs for over 50 years, including latterly the Amici Choir (part of Canterbury Cantata Trust). He was a keen and active member of Thanet University of the Third Age (Thanet U3A).

Pitt died late on 17 November 2017 in Queen Elizabeth the Queen Mother Hospital, Margate after a short illness, leaving his wife Janet and daughter Jane. He was 80.

Parliament of the United Kingdom
Preceded by Robert Taylor	Member of Parliament for Croydon North West; 1981–1983	Succeeded by Humfrey Malins
