= Blackford, Somerset =

Village in Somerset, England

Coordinates: 51.0348°N 2.4874°W

Blackford
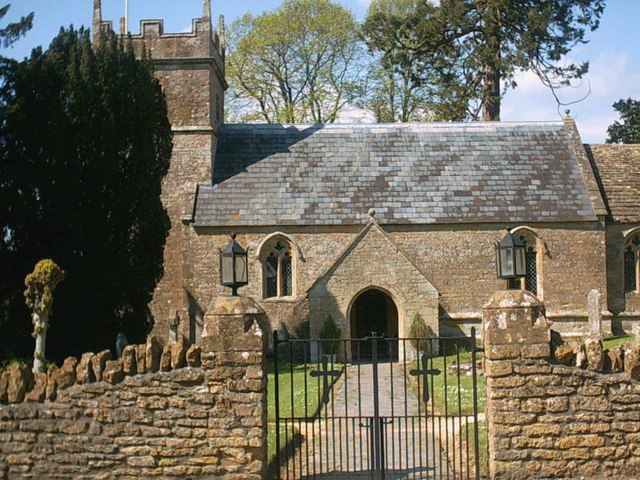
- Church of St Michael, Blackford

- Location within Somerset
- OS grid reference: ST659262
- Civil parish: Compton Pauncefoot
- Unitary authority: Somerset Council
- Ceremonial county: Somerset
- Region: South West
- Country: England
- Sovereign state: United Kingdom
- Post town: YEOVIL
- Postcode district: BA22
- Dialling code: 01963
- Police: Avon and Somerset
- Fire: Devon and Somerset
- Ambulance: South Western
- UK Parliament: Glastonbury and Somerton

Blackford is a village in the civil parish of Compton Pauncefoot, in the county of Somerset, England, beside the A303 road, 4 miles (6.4 km) south west of Wincanton. There are two other places called Blackford in Somerset: one is a village near Wedmore, the other a tiny hamlet in Selworthy parish between Porlock and Minehead.

In 1931, the civil parish had a population of 80. On the 1 April 1933, the civil parish was merged with Compton Pauncefoot. Compton Pauncefoot holds a Parish Meeting twice a year and has no Parish Council. The combined parish has approximately 130 residents and around 35 houses in each village. The civil parish is in the Blackmore Vale ward of the Somerset Council area.

Blackford is designated as a Conservation Area.

== History ==
In the Domesday Book of 1086 the manor is recorded as held by Turstin FitzRolf. The parish of Blackford was part of the Whitley Hundred.

The village has a Reading Room which was given to the church in 1912 by Miss Emily Senior, who sold the land it stands on to the Fidelity Trust Ltd for £25. It is now leased to the Blackford Reading Room Trust to be used as a village hall. Following a programme of works in the 1990s and as part of a millennium project with the aid of lottery and other grants the hall has been completely refurbished.

Baron Blackford, of Compton Pauncefoot in the County of Somerset, was a title in the Peerage of the United Kingdom. It was created in 1935 for the barrister William James Peake Mason. He had already been created a Baronet, of Compton Pauncefoot in the County of Somerset, in the Baronetage of the United Kingdom in 1918. The titles became extinct in 1988 on the death of his great-grandson, the fourth Baron.

== Geography ==
The stream through Blackford is a tributary of the River Cam (Somerset) and benefitted from works in 1982 to the riverbanks in Blackford to help keep the water moving. Flooding is therefore rarer than previously in Blackford as a result. It travels from Blackford to Compton Pauncefoot and then travels under the A303 to join the Yarlington headwaters. The River Cam flows onto the Royal Naval Station where it joins the River Yeo and the Yeo in turn flows west to the south of Yeovilton and through the town of Ilchester. The river course continues to the west and at Langport becomes the River Parrett.

The stream has its headwaters in the hills around Blackford & Compton Pauncefoot together with a number of springs. The main waters come from 3 primary sources: 1. Maperton, 2. Quarry Hill, 3. Sigwells Hill. The first 2 combine in Blackford around the Crossroads/Hollow and further springs contribute at a number of points all the way through both villages.

The A303 is nearby and during construction major drainage pipes were laid at intervals that bring significant quantities of water into the stream. This contributes to the rapid rise in the stream during rainfall.

Blackford is fortunate that it is relatively high in the watercourse and consequently only local rainfall and runoff comes through the villages.

== Landmarks ==
The village has a number of notable buildings including: East Hall Farm, West Hall Farm, The Old Rectory, Manor Farm, Belstone Cottage, Chapel Cottage, Old Beams. The telephone box is the iconic K6 Telephone Kiosk and was listed Grade II by English Heritage in July 2008 following a local campaign. There are approximately 2,500 listed telephone boxes in the country.

== Religious sites ==
The Church of St Michael has 11th- or 12th-century origins, and has been designated by English Heritage as a Grade II* listed building. The church is part of the Camelot Group of Parishes in the Diocese of Bath and Wells. The tower was added in the 14th century and there were other changes around that time including the addition of south porch. More recent changes include the 17th century pulpit. There is a screen designed by Frederick Bligh Bond that was added in 1916 and the current organ arrived in 1970. The east window was made by the Charles Eamer Kempe studio and installed in 1882. However the paint flaked and after lengthy discussions and deliberations a replacement was commissioned from John Hayward (who also made the new window in Sherborne Abbey) with the subject 'The Good Shepherd'.

There was a Methodist Chapel (built circa 1840) at the end of Chapel Lane and closed in 1947. It is now part of Old Beams curtilage — but the roof was removed in the 1960s to allow a better view from the dwelling.

Chapel Cottage is the oldest house in the village and is reputed to have been a chapel with cottage attached — however there is some doubt over this. The newer, western cottage dates from the 16th Century while the eastern cottage is medieval has a stone spiral staircase and other old features.
