= Ngwaba =

Ngwaba may be,

- Ngwaba language
- Chidi Ngwaba
