= Timothy King (disambiguation) =

Tim or Timothy King may refer to:

- Sir Timothy King (born 1949), British barrister and justice
- Tim King (born 1967), American educator, founder of Urban Prep Academies
- Tim King, American bassist, co-founder in 1997 of alternative metal band Soil
- Tim King, New Zealand district councillor and Mayor of Tasman since 2019
- Timothy James King M.A. Ph.D., creator of AmigaDOS

== See also ==
- Tim Kingsbury (born 1977), Canadian musician, member of indie rock band Arcade Fire
