= Glyn Mason, 2nd Baron Blackford =

British businessman, magistrate and politician

Glyn Keith Murray Mason, 2nd Baron Blackford, CBE DSO JP (29 May 1887 – 31 December 1972) was a British businessman, magistrate and Conservative politician.

== Background ==
Mason was born in 1887 to Edith Mason née Affleck and William Mason (1862–1947). His father, created a baronet in 1918 and 1st Baron Blackford in 1935, was a barrister and magistrate.

== First World War ==
Mason served as a colonel in the 14th Hussars, seeing action in World War I in France, Salonica and Palestine. He was awarded the Distinguished Service Order in 1916.

== Career ==
At the general election in November 1922, Sir Glyn was elected unopposed as Conservative Member of Parliament (MP) for Croydon North, then in Surrey. He kept his seat in the 1923, 1924, 1929, 1931, and 1935 general elections, facing Gilbert Foan for the Labour Party on three occasions. On 1 June 1940, Mason resigned his seat by accepting the stewardship of the Manor of Northstead. He was President of the North Croydon Bowls Club twice in 1926 and 1927

During World War II, Mason served in the City of London Home Guard. He became a Justice of the Peace in 1946 in Somerset and succeeded his father as second Baron Blackford in 1947. He was a Lieutenant of the City of London from 1951 to 1958. Lord Blackford was a successful businessman, becoming deputy chairman of the Midland Bank, and Chairman, then Hon. President of the Guardian Assurance Company.

In the House of Lords, Lord Blackford was Deputy Speaker. In the 1950s, he was considered for the post of Chancellor of the Primrose League, a conservative-leaning political and social organisation in honour of Benjamin Disraeli. He was appointed a Commander of the Order of the British Empire (CBE) in 1962.

== Family ==
Mason married Grace Keen who died in 1972, with whom he had three children. His second son, Keith, succeeded him as Baron Blackford.

Parliament of the United Kingdom
Preceded by George Borwick	Member of Parliament for Croydon North; 1922–1940	Succeeded by Henry Willink
Peerage of the United Kingdom
Preceded by William Mason	Baron Blackford; 1947–1972	Succeeded by Keith Mason
