= Croydon North West =

Parliamentary constituency in the United Kingdom, 1955–1997

Coordinates: 51.39°N 0.11°W

- Former borough constituency for the House of Commons
- Boundary of Croydon North West in for the 1983 general election
- County: 1955–1965: Surrey; 1965–1997: Greater London

1955–1997
- Seats: One
- Created from: Croydon North and Croydon West
- Replaced by: Croydon North

Croydon North West was a borough constituency represented in the House of Commons of the Parliament of the United Kingdom. It elected one Member of Parliament (MP) by the first past the post system of election.

== Politics and history of the constituency ==
The Croydon North West constituency was created for the 1955 general election, just five years after a previous re-organisation of the three seats in the County Borough of Croydon.

It took in areas of the former Croydon North and Croydon West constituencies and bordered Croydon North East and Croydon South, as well as, when originally created, the constituencies of Streatham, Norwood, Beckenham and Mitcham.

The constituency was abolished at the 1997 general election and was entirely subsumed within the new Croydon North, with the addition of the Thornton Heath, Upper Norwood and South Norwood wards.

For almost all of its history, Croydon North West had Conservative Members of Parliament. It was the scene of a famous by-election in 1981, following the death of its MP, won by Bill Pitt for the SDP-Liberal Alliance. However, it returned to the Conservatives two years later, remaining so until it was snatched by Malcolm Wicks for the Labour Party at the 1992 general election.

== Boundaries ==
Dates	Local authority	Maps	Wards
1955–1974	County Borough of Croydon		Bensham Manor, Norbury, Upper Norwood, West Thornton, and Whitehorse Manor.
1974–1983	London Borough of Croydon		Bensham Manor, Norbury, Upper Norwood, West Thornton, and Whitehorse Manor.
1983–1997	London Borough of Croydon		Bensham Manor, Beulah, Broad Green, Norbury, West Thornton, and Whitehorse Manor.

When first created, Croydon North West included the areas of Norbury, Upper Norwood and parts of west Croydon and Thornton Heath. It saw various boundary changes, largely stretching further south and losing its more easterly parts. At the time of its abolition in 1997, Croydon North West covered all of West Croydon, Selhurst, Norbury and parts of Thornton Heath around the Thornton Heath Pond, within the London Borough of Croydon.

== Members of Parliament ==
Election	Member	Party	Notes
1955	Fred Harris	Conservative	Member for main predecessor seat (1948–1955)
1970	Robert Taylor	Conservative	Died 1981
1981 by-election	Bill Pitt	Liberal	
1983	Humfrey Malins	Conservative	
1992	Malcolm Wicks	Labour	Contested Croydon North following redistribution
1997	constituency abolished: see Croydon North		

== Elections ==
=== Elections in the 1950s ===
General election 1955: Croydon North West
Party	Candidate	Votes	%
Conservative	Fred Harris	26,297	56.9
Labour	Ronald Huzzard	15,760	34.1
Liberal	Ivy Thurston	4,139	9.0
Majority		10,537	22.8
Turnout		46,196	77.5
Registered electors		59,575	
Conservative win (new seat)			

General election 1959: Croydon North West
Party	Candidate	Votes	%	±%
Conservative	Fred Harris	25,111	54.8	–2.1
Labour	David W. Chalkley	14,658	32.0	–2.1
Liberal	Ivy Thurston	6,061	13.2	+4.2
Majority		10,453	22.8	±0.0
Turnout		45,830	78.8	+1.2
Registered electors		58,177		
Conservative hold		Swing	–0.0	

=== Elections in the 1960s ===
General election 1964: Croydon North West
Party	Candidate	Votes	%	±%
Conservative	Fred Harris	19,577	46.9	–7.9
Labour	J.A.P. Palmer	13,967	33.5	+1.5
Liberal	Ronald E J Banks	8,201	19.7	+6.4
Majority		5,610	13.4	–9.4
Turnout		41,745	74.4	–4.4
Registered electors		56,122		
Conservative hold		Swing	–4.7	

General election 1966: Croydon North West
Party	Candidate	Votes	%	±%
Conservative	Fred Harris	18,578	45.4	–1.5
Labour	Michael J Stewart	15,882	38.8	+5.3
Liberal	Ronald E J Banks	6,466	15.8	–3.8
Majority		2,696	6.6	–6.9
Turnout		40,926	74.4	–0.0
Registered electors		55,042		
Conservative hold		Swing	–3.4	

=== Elections in the 1970s ===
General election 1970: Croydon North West
Party	Candidate	Votes	%	±%
Conservative	Robert Taylor	19,260	49.9	+4.5
Labour	Stanley Boden	14,687	38.0	–0.8
Liberal	Ronald E J Banks	4,666	12.1	–3.7
Majority		4,573	11.8	+5.3
Turnout		38,613	67.7	–6.7
Registered electors		57,066		
Conservative hold		Swing	+2.6	

1970 notional result
Party	Vote	%
Conservative	19,100	49.2
Labour	15,000	38.7
Liberal	4,700	12.1
Turnout	38,800	67.8
Electorate	57,228	

General election February 1974: Croydon North West
Party	Candidate	Votes	%	±%
Conservative	Robert Taylor	17,887	42.2	–7.1
Labour	Stanley Boden	14,816	34.9	–3.7
Liberal	Bill Pitt	9,707	22.9	+10.8
Majority		3,071	7.2	–3.3
Turnout		42,410	77.4	+9.6
Registered electors		54,759		
Conservative hold		Swing	–1.7	

General election October 1974: Croydon North West
Party	Candidate	Votes	%	±%
Conservative	Robert Taylor	16,035	42.0	–0.2
Labour	Stanley Boden	14,556	38.1	+3.2
Liberal	Bill Pitt	6,563	17.2	–5.7
National Front	Peter John Holland	1,049	2.7	New
Majority		1,479	3.87	–3.4
Registered electors		55,176		
Turnout		38,203	69.2	–8.2
Conservative hold		Swing	–1.7	

General election 1979: Croydon North West
Party	Candidate	Votes	%	±%
Conservative	Robert Taylor	19,928	49.4	+7.4
Labour	Stanley Boden	16,159	40.1	+2.0
Liberal	Bill Pitt	4,239	10.5	–6.7
Majority		3,769	9.4	+5.5
Turnout		40,326	72.5	+3.3
Registered electors		55,608		
Conservative hold		Swing	+2.7	

=== Elections in the 1980s ===
By-election 1981: Croydon North West
Party	Candidate	Votes	%	±%
Liberal	Bill Pitt	13,800	40.0	+29.4
Conservative	John Butterfill	10,546	30.5	–18.9
Labour	Stanley Boden	8,967	26.0	–14.1
National Front	Nick Griffin	429	1.2	New
Independent Pro-Life	Marilyn Gillies Carr	340	1.0	New
Ecology	John Foster	155	0.4	New
Constitutional Movement	Suzan McKenzie	111	0.3	New
Disabled War Pensioners Association	Lawrence Brooks	81	0.2	New
Democratic Monarchist, Public Safety, White Resident	Bill Boaks	51	0.1	New
Family Law Reform Party	George Major	31	0.1	New
London Federation of Self-Employed	Josef Joseph	20	0.1	New
Anti-Common Market - Free Trade	Stephen Done	11	0.0	New
Majority		3,254	9.4	N/A
Turnout		34,542	62.8	–9.7
Registered electors		55,009		
Liberal gain from Conservative		Swing	+24.2	

1979 notional result
Party	Vote	%
Conservative	19,415	46.3
Labour	18,006	42.9
Liberal	4,491	10.7
Others	46	0.1
Turnout	41,958	
Electorate		

General election 1983: Croydon North West
Party	Candidate	Votes	%	±%
Conservative	Humfrey Malins	16,674	42.3	–4.0
Liberal	Bill Pitt	12,582	31.9	+21.2
Labour	Ian Smedley	9,561	24.2	–18.7
National Front	Nick Griffin	336	0.9	N/A
Ecology	Tim A.J. Rowe	286	0.7	N/A
Majority		4,092	10.4	+7.0
Turnout		39,439	67.6	–4.9
Registered electors		58,333		
Conservative hold		Swing	–12.6	

General election 1987: Croydon North West
Party	Candidate	Votes	%	±%
Conservative	Humfrey Malins	18,665	47.0	+4.7
Labour	Malcolm Wicks	14,677	37.0	+12.7
Liberal	Leslie Rowe	6,363	16.0	−15.9
Majority		3,988	10.0	–0.3
Turnout		39,705	69.2	+1.6
Registered electors		57,369		
Conservative hold		Swing	–4.0	

=== Elections in the 1990s ===
General election 1992: Croydon North West
Party	Candidate	Votes	%	±%
Labour	Malcolm Wicks	19,152	47.3	+10.3
Conservative	Humfrey Malins	17,626	43.5	−3.5
Liberal Democrats	Linda F. Hawkins	3,728	9.2	−6.8
Majority		1,526	3.8	N/A
Turnout		40,506	70.8	+0.9
Registered electors		57,241		
Labour gain from Conservative		Swing	+6.9	

== See also ==
- List of parliamentary constituencies in London

== Sources ==
- Leigh Rayment's Historical List of MPs – Constituencies beginning with "C" (part 6)
- The Times House of Commons 1955. 1955.
