= 1981 Croydon North West by-election =

← 1979	22 October 1981	1983 →

Constituency of Croydon North West
- Turnout: 62.5% (▼10.0%)
	First party	Second party	Third party
	Lib		Lab
Candidate	Bill Pitt	John Butterfill	Stanley Boden
Party	Liberal	Conservative	Labour
Popular vote	13,800	10,546	8,967
Percentage	40.0%	30.5%	26.0%
Swing	▲29.4%	▼18.9%	▼14.1%
MP before election
Robert Taylor
Conservative
Subsequent MP
Bill Pitt
Liberal

The 1981 Croydon North West by-election took place on 22 October 1981. It was caused by the death of Conservative Member of Parliament Robert Taylor on 18 June 1981.

The Conservative Party selected John Butterfill, then vice-chairman of Guildford Conservative Association. The Labour Party, the runners-up at the 1979 general election, selected a local councillor, Stanley Boden.

The Liberal Party had come a distant third in 1979, but the by-election came shortly after the formation of the Social Democratic Party (SDP), with whom the Liberals had entered into an electoral pact, the SDP–Liberal Alliance. It was therefore expected that the election would provide a platform for Shirley Williams of the SDP to return to Parliament, having lost her seat in 1979. However, the Liberal Party insisted on their own candidate and selected the lesser known Bill Pitt who had stood in the seat for the previous three general elections and at the time was the London Regional Party Chair.

The 22-year-old Nick Griffin (who became leader of the British National Party in 1999) stood in his first election in Croydon North West, representing the National Front. Bill Boaks, a road safety campaigner and perennial candidate, was also on the ballot. In total, a record twelve candidates stood, one more than in the 1978 Lambeth Central by-election. This record was broken at the 1984 Chesterfield by-election.

Pitt duly won the seat on the surge of support for the Alliance and a 24% swing, strengthening the Liberals' hand in negotiations with the SDP.

== Result ==
Croydon North West By-election 1981
Party	Candidate	Votes	%	±%
Liberal	Bill Pitt	13,800	39.95	+29.44
Conservative	John Butterfill	10,546	30.53	−18.89
Labour	Stanley Boden	8,967	25.96	−14.11
National Front	Nick Griffin	429	1.24	New
Independent Pro-Life	Marilyn Gillies Carr	340	0.98	New
Ecology	John Foster	155	0.45	New
Nationalist Party	Suzan McKenzie	111	0.32	New
Disabled War Pensioners Association	Lawrence Brooks	81	0.23	New
Democratic Monarchist, Public Safety, White Resident	Bill Boaks	51	0.15	New
Family Law Reform Party	George Major	31	0.09	New
London Federation of Self-Employed	Josef Joseph	20	0.06	New
Anti-Common Market - Free Trade	Stephen Done	11	0.03	New
Majority		3,254	9.42	N/A
Turnout		34,542	62.5	−10.0
Liberal gain from Conservative		Swing	+24.2	

== Aftermath ==
Pitt's win was the Alliance's first electoral success and delighted Liberal leader David Steel who said that the party had won a greater majority than they had expected. Noting that they seemed to have taken support away from both of the main parties in almost equal measure, Steel stated that "I believe that we are now unstoppable." The political editor of The Glasgow Herald, Geoffrey Parkhouse, said the result "shattered" both Labour and the Conservatives and noted that Margaret Thatcher and Michael Foot would fear that the result reflected the victorious Pitt's claim that the Alliance had "caught the imagination of the voters" and that as consequence there were "no longer any safe seats for Tory or Labour in the country." Parkhouse also thought the result made the Alliance favourites to win the forthcoming by-election in Crosby. Pitt was not successful in retaining the seat in the 1983 general election, losing to Conservative candidate Humfrey Malins. At the same general election, the unsuccessful Conservative candidate John Butterfill was elected as the MP for Bournemouth West, a seat he held for 27 years until his retirement in 2010.

== Previous result ==
General election 1979: Croydon North West
Party	Candidate	Votes	%	±%
Conservative	Robert Taylor	19,928	49.4	+7.4
Labour	Stanley Boden	16,159	40.1	+2.0
Liberal	Bill Pitt	4,239	10.5	−6.7
Majority		3,769	9.3	+5.5
Turnout		40,326	72.5	+3.3
Conservative hold		Swing	+2.7	

== See also ==
- List of United Kingdom by-elections
