= George Borwick (politician) =

British politician

George Oldroyd Borwick DSO (7 March 1879 – 27 June 1964) was a Conservative Party politician in the United Kingdom.

He was elected at the 1918 general election as member of parliament (MP) for Croydon North, but stepped down at the 1922 election. He did not stand for Parliament again.

He was awarded a DSO in 1917.

Parliament of the United Kingdom
New constituency	Member of Parliament for Croydon North; 1918–1922	Succeeded by Glyn Mason
