= Robert Taylor (Conservative politician) =

British politician

Robert George Taylor (7 December 1932 – 18 June 1981) was a British Conservative politician.

== Background ==
Taylor was born in 1932, and attended Cranleigh School. He worked in architectural ironmongery, becoming an executive with the G and S Allgood company. He served as a parachutist in the Territorial Army.

In 1964, he married Rosemary Box, and they had two children.

== Parliamentary career ==
Taylor fought Battersea North in 1959 and 1964, but was defeated each time by Labour's Douglas Jay.

He was Member of Parliament for Croydon North West from 1970 until he died from a heart attack at his home in Surrey on 18 June 1981, aged 48, 11 years to the day after his election to parliament. In the subsequent by-election, the Conservatives lost the seat to Liberal Bill Pitt.

Parliament of the United Kingdom
Preceded by Fred Harris	Member of Parliament for Croydon North West; 1970–1981	Succeeded by Bill Pitt
