= Fred Harris (British politician) =

British politician (1915–1979)

Frederic Harris

Member of Parliament for Croydon North West Croydon North (1948–1955)
- In office 11 March 1948 – 18 June 1970
- Preceded by: Henry Willink
- Succeeded by: Robert Taylor

Personal details
- Born: Frederic Walter Harris; 6 March 1915 Balham, Wandsworth, London, UK
- Died: 4 January 1979 (aged 63) Kenya
- Party: Conservative
- Children: 3
- Education: Belmont College

Frederic Walter Harris (6 March 1915 – 4 January 1979) was a British politician and businessman. He was Conservative Member of Parliament in Croydon between 1948 and 1970.

== Early career ==
Fred Harris was born in Balham, South London, and educated at Belmont College, Streatham. After working for a period in local government, he founded his own business with money invested by Sir Sydney Marshall. Marshall's Malted Milk was set up in Clapham but soon moved to Croydon. The company expanded and during World War II making a range of foodstuffs. Harris made his fortune. The company became Marshall's Universal Ltd, then was publicly listed. By 1965, the company had fourteen subsidiaries in Britain and East Africa, working in engineering, vehicles, canning, food manufacture and farming. It had an annual turnover of £5 million; Harris remained Chairman of every company, even as MP.

== Political career ==
Harris was active in the local Conservative Party. He stood in the 1945 and 1946 local elections in Broad Green and Addiscombe respectively but was unsuccessful. He was elected to the council of the County Borough of Croydon for Central ward in December 1946 in a by-election, however, and was re-elected in 1947 for a full four-year term. He served as a ratepayers' association representative, which was effectively a cover for the local Conservatives. He was also elected as the youngest councillor on Surrey County Council, representing Godstone.

Croydon had been safe Conservative territory since first electing its own Member of Parliament in 1885. But in the 1945 General Election, the Labour had taken Croydon South and come within 607 votes in Croydon North. In January 1948, Sir Henry Willink resigned as Conservative MP for Croydon North. Labour and the Liberals selected high-profile candidates, Harold Nicolson, while Air Vice-Marshal Don Bennett stood for the Liberal Party. Harris was selected by the local Conservative Association as their candidate for the Croydon North by-election, and had their wholehearted support.

Conservative Central Office were not so sure. They were concerned that a local businessman with little fame or track record would struggle to defeat a former MP and World War II hero. Odds were given of 6:1 against the Conservatives winning. Harris was summoned to see Party leader Winston Churchill, which Harris realised was to dissuade him from standing. He later said, "when he discovered how determined I was to win the seat, he put his arm around my shoulders and said he would help me all he could". Churchill toured the constituency, making speeches from the top of his car. His daughter Mary Soames was then in a Croydon maternity hospital about to give birth (to her son Nicholas), bringing the campaign positive publicity. Harris gained a majority of 11,664. Following the result, a national newspaper ran the headline "Oh what a beautiful morning". The song (from Oklahoma!) became his theme tune when touring Croydon.

Harris never shone in Parliament. He was a moderate Tory and embraced change and democracy. He had no time for the right-wing, predicting that their politics would "die". In Croydon, however, he was extremely popular, working hard especially on casework for individual constituents, which he said was the most rewarding part of the job. He was given the honour to drive the last tram (before Tramlink returned) through the constituency with the Mayor of Croydon. He increased his majority and served as MP for Croydon North, then Croydon North West for 22 years until he stepped down at the 1970 general election. This at that time made him the longest-serving Croydon MP (a record later broken by Bernard Weatherill).

== Personal life ==
Fred Harris had three children with his first wife – Roger who became an engineer in Kenya, Gillian, who also moved to East Africa, and Jacqueline who worked as secretary to the Deputy Chairman of the Conservative Party. His wife died in 1955. In 1957 he married Joan Bagnall. He lived in Woldingham, Surrey and on his farm in Subukia, Kenya.

Harris was very keen on sport. He had held a schoolboy cricket record and played football in the Spartan League. He played tennis all his life and was an occasional croc hunter. He campaigned successfully for Croydon Council to build Croydon Sports Arena in South Norwood. He was also a racehorse owner, with Gordon Richards as a regular jockey. In the 1940s he had a considerable lucky streak, with 50 wins out of 90 outings. His horse 'Now or Never' won the Great Metropolitan at Epsom in 1948.

Harris died in January 1979, aged 63, in Kenya, after a long illness.

Parliament of the United Kingdom
Preceded by Henry Willink	Member of Parliament for Croydon North; 1948–1955	Constituency abolished
New constituency	Member of Parliament for Croydon North West; 1955–1970	Succeeded by Robert Taylor
