= Church of St Michael, Blackford =

Church in Somerset, England

Church of St Michael
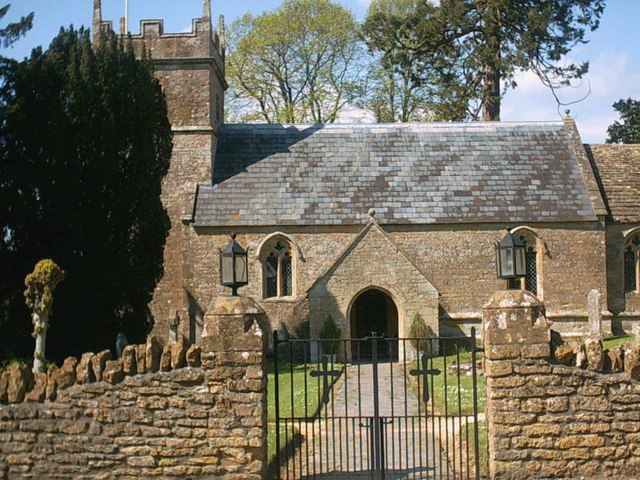

- Location within Somerset
- 51.0337°N 2.4891°W
- Location: Blackford, Somerset, England

History
- Built: 11th or 12th century

Listed Building – Grade II*
- Official name: Church of St Michael
- Designated: 24 March 1961
- Reference no.: 1056557

The Anglican Church of St Michael in Blackford, Somerset, England was built in the 11th or 12th century. It is a Grade II* listed building.

== History ==
The church was built in the 11th or 12th century. The tower was added in the 14th century and there were other changes around that time including the addition of south porch. The musicians gallery was added in the 18th century. The west gallery has been removed.

The church is part of the Camelot Group of Parishes in the Diocese of Bath and Wells.

== Architecture ==
The stone building has Doulting stone dressings and a stone slate roof. It consists of a three-bay nave and two-bay chancel with a south porch. The two-stage west tower has battlemented parapets and is supported by corner buttresses. The tower contains three bells, the oldest of which was cast in 1620.

The interior fittings include a 17th-century pulpit and 11th century circular font.

There is a screen designed by Frederick Bligh Bond that was added in 1916, and the current organ arrived in 1970. The east window was made by the Charles Eamer Kempe studio and installed in 1882. However the paint flaked and after lengthy discussions and deliberations a replacement was commissioned from John Hayward (who also made the new window in Sherborne Abbey) with the subject 'The Good Shepherd'.

== See also ==
- List of ecclesiastical parishes in the Diocese of Bath and Wells
