= Nick Griffin =

British politician (born 1959)

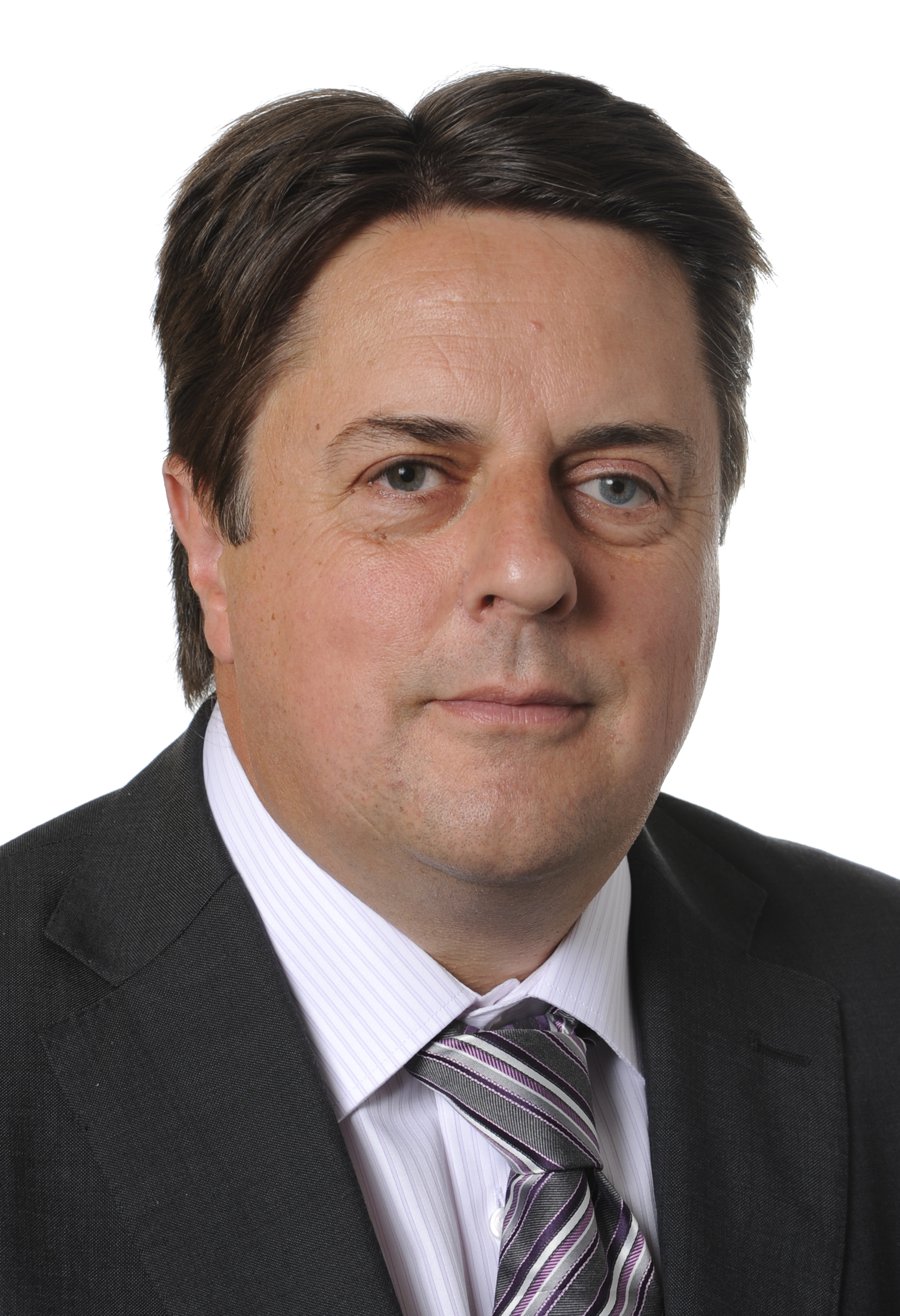
- Official portrait, 2009

Vice president of the Alliance for Peace and Freedom
- Incumbent
- Assumed office 2018
- President: Roberto Fiore

President of the British National Party
- In office 21 July 2014 – 1 October 2014

Chairman of the British National Party
- In office 27 September 1999 – 21 July 2014
- Preceded by: John Tyndall
- Succeeded by: Adam Walker

Member of the European Parliament for North West England
- In office 4 June 2009 – 2 July 2014
- Preceded by: Den Dover
- Succeeded by: Louise Bours

Personal details
- Born: Nicholas John Griffin; 1 March 1959 (age 67) Barnet, Hertfordshire, England
- Party: Alliance for Peace and Freedom (since 2015)
- Other political affiliations: British National Party (1995–2014); National Front (1974–1989)
- Spouse: Jackie Griffin (m. 1985)
- Children: 4
- Education: Downing College, Cambridge (BA)

Nicholas John Griffin (born 1 March 1959) is a British far-right politician who was chairman of the British National Party (BNP) from 1999 to 2014, and a Member of the European Parliament (MEP) for North West England from 2009 to 2014. Following this, he was president of the BNP between July and October 2014, when he was expelled from the party.

Born in Barnet, Griffin was educated at Woodbridge School in Suffolk. He joined the National Front at the age of 14 and, following his graduation from the University of Cambridge, became a political worker for the party. In 1980 he became a member of its governing body, and later wrote articles for several right-wing magazines. He was the National Front's candidate for the seat of Croydon North West in 1981 and 1983, but left the party in 1989. In 1995, he joined the BNP and in 1999 became its leader. He stood as the party's candidate in several elections and became a member of the European Parliament for North West England in the 2009 European elections.

In 1998, Griffin was convicted of distributing material likely to incite racial hatred, for which he received a suspended prison sentence. In 2006, he was acquitted of separate charges of inciting racial hatred. He has been criticised for many of his comments on political, social, ethical and religious matters, but after becoming leader of the BNP he sought to distance himself from some of his previously held positions, which included Holocaust denial. Events where Griffin has been invited to participate in public debates or political discussions have often resulted in protests and cancellations. Since 2018, he has been the vice-president of the Alliance for Peace and Freedom.

== Early life and education ==
Griffin's father, Edgar Griffin (born 1921, Brighton, East Sussex) was previously a long-standing Conservative Party member, and from 1959 to 1965 a councillor for the Metropolitan Borough of St Marylebone. He was also a councillor on Waveney District Council during the 1980s. In 2001, he was expelled from the Conservatives amid accusations of racism. Griffin's mother, Jean (née Thomas), whom Edgar married in 1950, was an unsuccessful BNP candidate for Enfield North in the 1997 general election, in Chingford & Woodford Green for the 2001 general election and for London in the 1999 European elections. Griffin was born on 1 March 1959 in Barnet and moved to Southwold in Suffolk aged eight. He has one sister.

He was educated at Woodbridge School before winning a sixth-form scholarship to the independent Saint Felix School in Southwold, one of only two boys in the all-girls school.

Griffin read Adolf Hitler's Mein Kampf when he was 14, and "found all but one chapter extremely boring". He joined the National Front in 1974, while he was still 14, though he had to pretend he was 15, and at the age of 16 is reported to have stayed at the home of National Front organiser Martin Webster. In a four-page leaflet written in 1999, Webster claimed to have had a homosexual relationship with Griffin, then the BNP's publicity director. Griffin has denied any such relationship.

From 1977, Griffin studied history, then law, at Downing College, Cambridge. His affiliation with the National Front was revealed during a Cambridge Union debate, and his photograph was published in a student newspaper. He later founded the Young National Front Student organisation. He graduated with a lower second-class honours degree in law (2:2), and a boxing blue, having taken up the sport following a brawl in Lewisham with a member of an anti-fascist party. He boxed three times against Oxford in the annual Varsity match, winning twice and losing once. In an interview with The Independent, he said he gave it up because of a hand injury. He is a fan of Ricky Hatton and Joe Calzaghe, and an admirer of Amir Khan.

== Political career ==
=== 1970s–1990 ===
Following his graduation, Griffin became a political worker at the National Front headquarters. As a teenager he had accompanied his father to a National Front meeting, and by 1978, he was a national organiser for the party. He helped set up the White Noise Music Club in 1979, and several years later worked with white power skinhead band, Skrewdriver. In 1980, he became a member of the party's governing body, the National Directorate, and in the same year launched Nationalism Today with the aid of Joe Pearce, then editor of the NF youth paper Bulldog. As a National Front member, Griffin contested the seat of Croydon North West twice, in the 1981 by-election and 1983 general election, securing 1.2% and 0.9% of the vote.

Membership of the National Front declined significantly following the election of the Conservatives under Margaret Thatcher. As a result, the party became more radicalised, and a dissatisfied Griffin, along with fellow NF activists Derek Holland and Patrick Harrington, began to embrace the ideals of Italian fascist Roberto Fiore, who had arrived in the UK in 1980. By 1983, the group had broken away to form the NF Political Soldier faction, which advocated a revival of country "values" and a return to feudalism with the establishment of nationalist communes. Writing for Bulldog in 1985, Griffin praised the black separatist Louis Farrakhan, but his comments were unpopular with some members of the party. He also attempted to form alliances with Libya's Muammar al-Gaddafi and Iran's Ayatollah Khomeini, and praised the efforts of Welsh nationalist movement Meibion Glyndŵr.

Following a disagreement with Harrington (who subsequently formed the Third Way), and objections over the direction the party was heading, in 1989, Griffin left the National Front. Along with Holland and Fiore, he helped form the International Third Position (ITP), a development of the Political Soldier movement, but left the organisation in 1990. In the same year, he lost his left eye when a discarded shotgun cartridge exploded in a pile of burning wood, and since then he has worn a glass eye. The accident left him unable to work, and owing to other financial problems he subsequently petitioned for bankruptcy (the accident occurred in France, where he later lost money in a failed business project). For several years thereafter, he abstained from politics and was supported financially by his parents. He later stewarded a public Holocaust denial meeting hosted by David Irving.

=== 1993–1999 ===
Griffin re-entered politics in 1993 and, in 1995, at the behest of John Tyndall, joined the British National Party (BNP). He also became editor of two right-wing magazines owned by Tyndall, Spearhead and The Rune. Referring to the election of the BNP's first councillor, Derek Beackon, at a 1993 council by-election in Millwall, he wrote:

The electors of Millwall did not back a post modernist rightist party, but what they perceived to be a strong, disciplined organisation with the ability to back up its slogan "Defend Rights for Whites" with well-directed boots and fists.

Tyndall, also previously in the National Front, had founded the BNP in 1982, but his "brutal, streetfighting background" and admiration for Adolf Hitler and the Nazis had made any kind of respectability impossible. In his 1999 leadership campaign, Griffin embarked on a strategy to make the party electable, by taking it away from Tyndall's extremist image. He was helped by Tyndall's lack of familiarity with the mainstream media, and in the party's September election he defeated Tyndall to become head of the BNP. One of Griffin's changes included moderating the party's emphasis on the removal of multiculturalism, a policy it claims has a destructive influence on both immigrant and British cultures. Griffin pledged to eliminate "the three Hs: hobbyism, hard talk and Hitler". This realignment was designed to position the BNP alongside successful European far-right groups, such as the French Front National. Street protests were replaced by electoral campaigning, and some policies were moderated (the compulsory repatriation of ethnic minorities was instead made voluntary). Other policies included the introduction of capital punishment for paedophiles, rapists, drug dealers and some murderers, and corporal punishment for less serious crimes such as juvenile delinquency. Griffin's image as a Cambridge-educated family man was in contrast to the extremist image presented by the BNP under Tyndall's leadership. In October 1999, Griffin, supported by Tony Lecomber stood against Tyndall for leadership of the BNP. John Tyndall received just 30% of the votes, while Griffin the majority, 70%.

=== 2000–present ===
Griffin stood as his party's candidate in several English elections after joining the BNP. In 2000, he stood in West Bromwich West, in a by-election triggered by the resignation of Betty Boothroyd. He came fourth, with 794 votes (4.21% of those cast). Following the Oldham race riots he ran in Oldham West and Royton in the 2001 general election. He received 6,552 votes (16%), coming third ahead of the Liberal Democrats, but closely behind the second place Conservatives, who received 7,076 votes. He again stood for election in the Oldham Council election, for a seat representing the Chadderton North ward. He came second to the Labour candidate, receiving 993 votes (28%). In the 2004 European Parliament election, when he was the BNP candidate for the North West England constituency, the party received 134,959 votes (6.4% of those cast), but won no seats. In the 2005 general election he contested Keighley in West Yorkshire, and polled 4,240 votes (9.2%), finishing in fourth place.

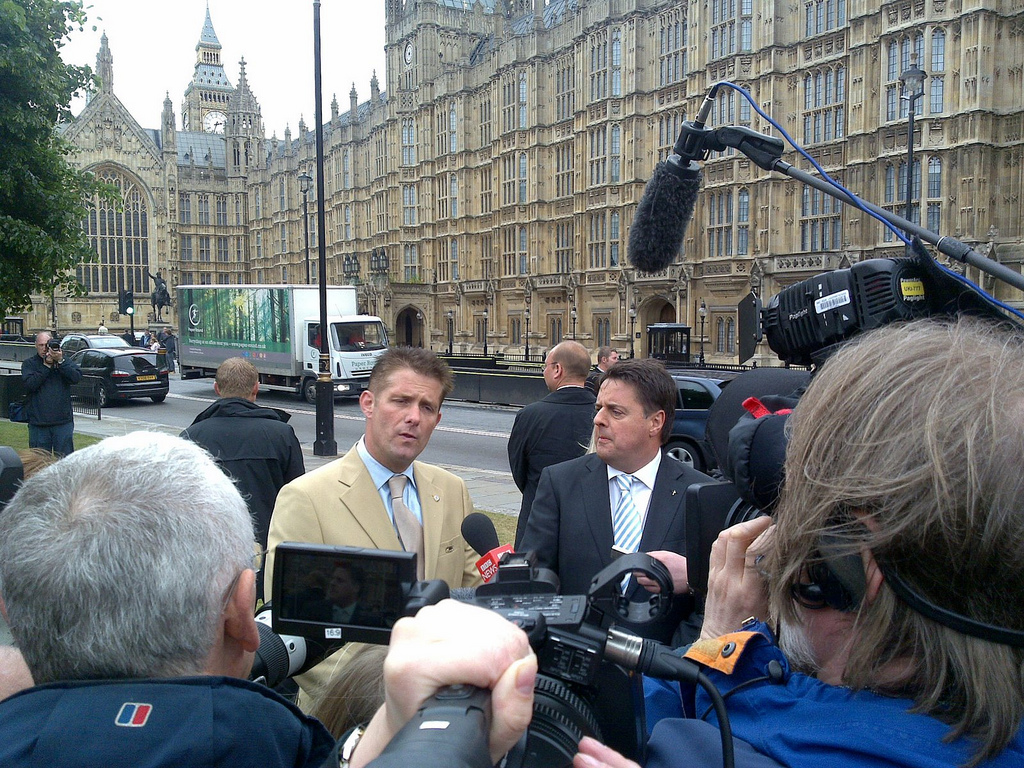
Richard Barnbrook (left) and Griffin at a press conference outside the Palace of Westminster in May 2009

Griffin was the BNP candidate in the 2007 Welsh National Assembly Elections, in the South Wales West region. The BNP received 8,993 votes (5.5% of those cast), behind the Labour party's 58,347 votes (35.8%). In May 2007, he was an unsuccessful candidate in the Thurrock Council election. In November 2008, the entire membership list of the BNP was posted on the Internet (though the list may have included lapsed members of the party and people who had expressed an interest in joining the party, but had not signed up). Griffin claimed that he knew the identity of the individual responsible, describing him as a hard-line senior employee who had left the party in the previous year. He welcomed the publicity that the story generated, using it to describe the common perception of the average BNP member as a "skinhead oik" as untrue.

He was elected as a member of the European Parliament for North West England in the 2009 European Elections. The BNP polled 943,598 votes (6.2%), gaining two MEPs. Griffin and fellow MEP Andrew Brons were subsequently pelted with eggs as they attempted to stage a celebratory press conference outside the Houses of Parliament. A second venue – a public house near Manchester – was chosen the following day. A line of police blocked a large group of protesters, who chanted "No platform for Nazi Nick" and "Nazi scum off our streets". Griffin viewed the election as an important victory, claiming that his party had been demonised and blocked from holding public meetings. "In Oldham alone there have been hundreds of thousands of pounds spent on employing bogus community workers to keep us out. To triumph against that level of pressure as a political party has never been done before."

In May 2009, he was invited by the BNP representative on the London Assembly, Richard Barnbrook, to accompany him to a Buckingham Palace garden party hosted by Queen Elizabeth II. The invitation prompted objections from several organisations and public figures, including the Mayor of London Boris Johnson, and the anti-fascist magazine Searchlight. Griffin declined this first invitation, out of fear of embarrassing the Queen via association, but when invited personally in 2010 he accepted:

This event shows just how far this party has come in the last few years but I won't be at the Palace for myself or my family. No! I will be there to represent the patriots who made this possible; I'll be there for you. I'll be there for all the stout-hearted men and women who down through the turbulent years tramped the streets with me in all weathers knocking doors, and those who ran the gauntlets of hate wherever we went.

The Palace later decided to deny Griffin entry to the event, claiming that he had used his invitation "for party political purpose through the media", and citing security concerns. Griffin claimed the decision was an "absolute scandal", and appeared to be "a rule invented for me".

In September 2009, he appealed to party activists for £150,000 of extra funding for the BNP. In the letter, he said that the party's ailing fortunes were a direct result of "attacks on the party". He also defended questions by the Electoral Commission about the transparency of BNP funding. In November 2009, Griffin was a witness at the trial of an Asian man, Tauriq Khalid, at Preston Crown Court. The prosecution claimed that in November 2008 Khalid repeatedly drove past a demonstration that Griffin was attending, and on the second occasion shouted "white bastards". Khalid admitted shouting derisory comments at Griffin and other demonstrators, telling the jury he shouted "Nick Griffin, you fucking wanker" and "Get the fuck out of Burnley, you're not welcome here", but denied shouting "white bastard". Griffin gave evidence against Khalid, and affirmed that Khalid had shouted "white bastard" at him. Griffin said the man "leaned out of the car and pointed at me and made a gun and gang gesture", and that he threatened him by shouting "I'm going to ...". Griffin said he had left the demonstration early, fearing for his safety. The 23-year-old defendant denied his comments had any racial intent, and was found not guilty. Griffin later commented "I think it's unfortunate and I think it's wrong, but that's the jury's right. They saw all the evidence, I accept their decision. I'm not going to lose any sleep over it."

In the 2010 general election he contested the Barking constituency polling 6,620 votes and finishing in third place. In 2011, following the loss of many of the council seats the BNP held in England, Griffin narrowly survived a leadership challenge.

In 2010, Griffin announced that by 2013 he would stand down as leader, to focus on his European Parliament election campaign. He lost his seat in Europe in the May 2014 European election and stepped down as BNP leader on 19 July 2014, becoming the organisation's president but on 1 October, the party announced that it had expelled Griffin, who, it claimed, was "deliberately fabricating a crisis" and leaking "damaging and defamatory allegations". Following his departure from the BNP, he founded British Unity, which he describes as "a growing team of experienced nationalist publicists and militants". He was a founder-member of the European far-right party, the Alliance for Peace and Freedom (APF) in 2015. In 2018, a new APF board was elected with Griffin as the vice-president.

In March 2015, Griffin attended the International Russian Conservative Forum in St. Petersburg, wherein he told his audience that Christendom would either face a "terrible civil war", become an Islamist caliphate or perhaps both.

In 2024 it was reported, by Searchlight magazine, that Griffin was attempting "one last return to the leadership of British fascism" by formalising links with the Independent Nationalist Network, a faction mainly based in the Midlands.

== Criminal charges ==
=== 1998 ===
In 1998, Griffin was convicted of violating section 19 of the Public Order Act 1986, relating to the offence of 'publishing or distributing racially inflammatory written material' in issue 12 of The Rune, published in 1996. Griffin's comments in the magazine were reported to the police by Alex Carlile, then the Liberal Democrat Member of Parliament for Montgomeryshire. Following a police raid at Griffin's home, he was charged with distributing material likely to incite racial hatred. Fellow BNP member Paul Ballard was also charged, but entered a guilty plea and did not stand trial. Griffin pleaded not guilty, and was tried at Harrow Crown Court. He called the French Holocaust denier Robert Faurisson and the nationalist Osiris Akkebala as witnesses, was found guilty and given a nine-month sentence, suspended for two years, and a £2,300 fine. Ballard was given a six-month sentence, also suspended for two years. He said, "I am well aware that the orthodox opinion is that six million Jews were gassed and cremated and turned into lampshades. Orthodox opinion also once held that the world is flat."

Griffin claimed that the law under which he was convicted was an unjust law and he therefore had no obligation to follow it. He was secretly recorded by the ITV programme The Cook Report in 1997 describing Carlile as "this bloody Jew ... whose only claim is that his grandparents died in the Holocaust". In the same programme, Griffin said of the Holocaust, "There is no doubt that hundreds, probably thousands of Jews were shot to death in Eastern Europe because they were, rightly or wrongly, seen as Communists or potential partisans or partisan supporters. That was awful. But this nonsense about gas chambers is exposed as a total lie."

Transcripts released under a 2014 Freedom of Information (FOI) request by The Guardian claimed that everything he did could be summed up as follows: "We must secure the existence of our race and a future for white children. Everything I do is related to building a nationalist movement through which peaceful persuasion and through the ballot box can place us in a position whereby those 14 words can be carried out." He reiterated his contention of Jewish control over the media, as well as his prior stance on Holocaust denial, and said that his aim was to "[take] political power so as to be able to institute changes, to undo the population shift which has taken place since 1948 with the first Immigration Act, to peacefully and as humanely as possible reverse that and to return Britain to being a homogeneous white nation".

=== 2004–2006 ===
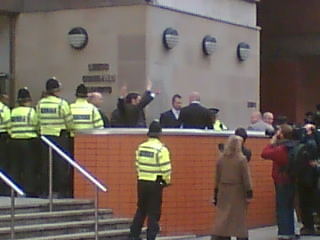
Nick Griffin and Mark Collett leave Leeds Crown Court on 10 November 2006 after being found not guilty of charges of incitement to racial hatred at their retrial.

On 14 December 2004, Griffin was arrested at his home in Wales, on suspicion of incitement to racial hatred, over remarks he made about Islam in an undercover BBC documentary titled The Secret Agent. He was questioned at a police station in Halifax, West Yorkshire, before being freed on police bail. He said that the arrest was "an electoral scam to get the Muslim block vote back to the Labour party" and that the Labour government was attempting to influence the results of the following year's general election.

Griffin's arrest was made two days after those of John Tyndall and several other people, over remarks they had made in the same programme. Following its broadcast on 15 July 2004, the police began an investigation into the programme's contents. The following April he was charged with four offences of using words or behaviour intended or likely to stir up racial hatred. The trial began in January 2006. Griffin stood alongside fellow party activist Mark Collett, who faced similar charges. Prosecuting, Rodney Jameson QC told the jury of six speeches that the accused had made in the Reservoir Tavern in Keighley on 19 January 2004. Reading excerpts from them, he claimed that they included threatening, abusive and insulting words directed at "people of Asian ethnicity", with the intention of "stirring up racial hatred".

Mainstream opinion in this country will be offended by some of the statements that they have heard made. At the same time, of course, the courts make their judgements on these things. But if there is something that needs to be done to look at the law then I think we will have to do that.

— Gordon Brown

Griffin was also accused of calling murdered black teenager Stephen Lawrence a drug dealer and bully who stole younger pupils' dinner money. In the witness box he defended himself by quoting passages from the Qur'an, saying that his comments describing Islam as a "vicious, wicked faith" were attacking not a race, but a religion. During the two-week trial he used a laptop to post daily updates on a blog on the BNP's website. In his closing address, defence barrister Timothy King QC said, "The British National Party is a legal, political entity. It has a right in a democratic society to put forward ideas and policies which some might find uncomfortable and some might find even offensive. There has been a tendency in this case to over-analyse speeches, to take one line here and one line there. You have got to look at the overall impact of these speeches—remember the context of each speech.

Griffin and Collett were cleared of half the charges against them—the jury remained divided on the other charges, and a retrial was ordered. On 10 November 2006, after five hours of deliberations, the jury at Leeds Crown Court cleared them of all charges. They were met outside the court by about 200 supporters, who Griffin addressed with a megaphone. He attacked Tony Blair and the BBC, and defended the BNP's right to freedom of speech. BNP Deputy Chairman Simon Darby later claimed that had Griffin been convicted, the BNP leader planned to go on hunger strike.

=== 2025 ===
In November 2025, Griffin appeared at Westminster Magistrates' Court in a private prosecution brought by the Campaign Against Antisemitism. It was alleged that in 2021 he shared on social media a cartoon that was "threatening, abusive or insulting", featuring a giant spider with a Star of David on its head.

== Public debates ==
Following his election as BNP leader, Griffin was invited to participate in debates at several universities. In November 2002, the Cambridge Union Society invited him to take part in a debate the following January. Titled "This house believes that Islam is a threat to the west", the resolution was controversial; alongside more moderate speakers, one of those invited was Abu Hamza al-Masri, a fundamentalist Muslim cleric. Some participants threatened to withdraw, and several official bodies criticised the invitations. The two had met earlier in the year, in a debate chaired by Rod Liddle, then editor of BBC Radio 4's Today programme. He was also invited by the Cambridge Forum to a debate on extremism in December 2002, with Liberal Democrat MP Lembit Öpik. The venue was changed twice after protests from property owners, but the threat of a violent confrontation between the Anti-Nazi League and BNP supporters forced the president of the Cambridge Forum, Chris Paley, to cancel the event. Paley called the decision an "own goal" for the values of free speech, and Öpik criticised it, emphasising his belief in "people's right to make their own decisions in a democracy".

In February 2005, Griffin was asked to take part in a debate on multiculturalism at the University of St Andrews in Scotland. He was invited by the president of the students' debating society, who said "We believe that the only way to get the truth of what the BNP are saying and to combat them is to do it in public in a debate." The move was attacked by anti-racist groups, some of whom refused to participate in the discussion. Griffin said "I am coming up because I was invited by the students at the university because they have a debate on an intelligent subject on which I have something to say. The people against it are the usual bunch of people who cannot win the argument and refuse to stand on a platform." The society withdrew the invitation before the event was to take place.

In May 2007, Griffin was invited to address a meeting at the University of Bath by politics student and BNP youth leader Danny Lake. Lake wanted Griffin to visit the university and explain the BNP's policies to lecturers and students. The invitation was viewed by some as an attempt by the party to establish a foothold on the university campus. Eleven union general secretaries wrote to the university's vice-chancellor and asked her to reconsider the decision to allow the meeting. A large protest was planned, and following students' concerns over their personal safety, the University cancelled the invitation.

Several months later, the Oxford Union invited Griffin to speak at a forum on the limits of free speech, along with other speakers including David Irving. The invitation was condemned by the Equality and Human Rights Commission head Trevor Phillips and the president of the Oxford Students' Union. The Conservative MP Dr Julian Lewis resigned his membership of the Union. A rally against the invitation was held at Oxford Town Hall on 20 November, and included the Oxford Students' Union president, the National Union of Students black students' officer, and the Trades Union Congress south east regional secretary. Representatives of Unite Against Fascism also attended, as well as the University of Oxford's Jewish student chaplain. Several Holocaust survivors spoke at the rally. Stephen Altmann-Richer, co-president of the Oxford University Jewish Society, said "I don't think these people should be invited to the Oxford Union, by having them speak, it legitimises their views ..." On the night of the debate, about 50 protesters forced their way into the venue, and a crowd of hundreds gathered outside carrying banners bearing anti-racist slogans and voicing anti-BNP chants. Police blocked the entrances to the building, and removed the protesters encamped inside. Griffin was accompanied into the premises by security guards. The event was eventually split between two rooms, with Griffin speaking in one, and Irving in the other; many Union Society members were unable to gain access. Although many present found the debate objectionable, some were supportive of both Griffin and Irving's right to freedom of speech. The Oxford Union later endorsed the debate as a success.

Griffin travelled to the United States and spoke at Clemson University and Texas A&M University, but the reception he received in October 2007 at Michigan State University was markedly different from that in the other venues. Intending to address the "overpopulation of Islamists in Europe", he was repeatedly interrupted, to the point where the event became a question and answer session. He was heckled by hostile elements of the audience, and at one point the fire alarm was activated.

=== 2009 appearance on Question Time ===
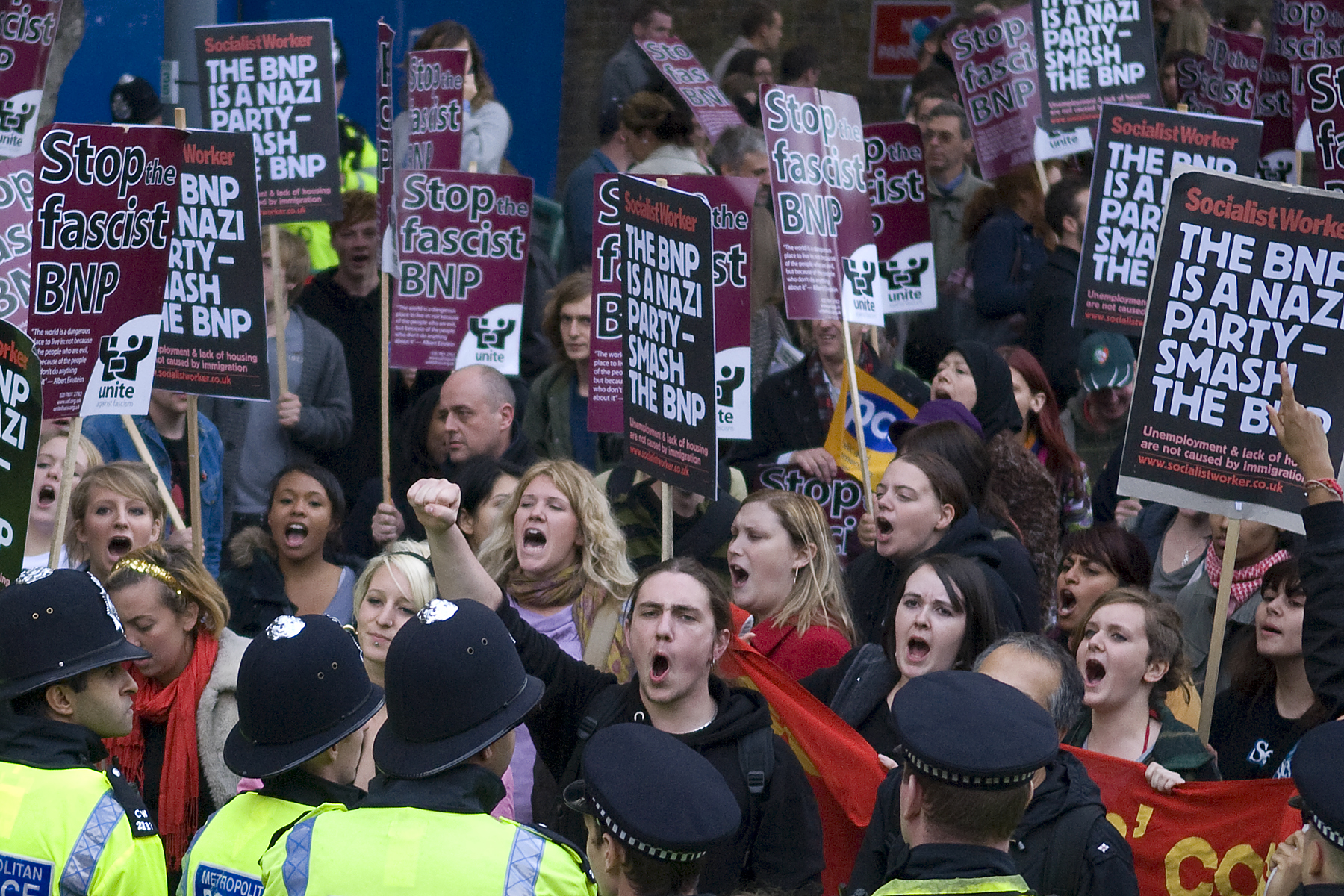
Protests outside BBC Television Centre ahead of Griffin's appearance on Question Time

On 22 October 2009, Griffin took part in the BBC's topical debate programme, Question Time, as a representative of the BNP. He appeared alongside Bonnie Greer, Jack Straw, Baroness Warsi and Chris Huhne. He was challenged by members of the studio audience, and questioned by host David Dimbleby on comments he had previously made on the Holocaust. He was also critical of Islam. His invitation followed the election of two BNP MEPs to the European Parliament, and led to significant debate over the merits of the BBC's decision. The appearance sparked a protest outside the BBC Television Centre prior to the recording of the programme, in which an estimated 500 people picketed the front entrance of the complex, many chanting anti-Nazi slogans and others trying to break into the building to stop the programme being filmed. Some got past the police and security, but were expelled. Six protesters were arrested, and three police officers were injured, one needing hospital treatment.

It was an odd show because almost all of the questions — even the five minutes on gays — were BNP-related, and the entire audience and panel anti-Griffin.

— Libby Purves

The programme was watched by an estimated 8.2 million viewers, more than three times the average figure for Question Time, and on a comparable level with prime time entertainment shows. Griffin's appearance dominated the following day's media; a follow-up report in the New York Times said that "the early reading by many of Britain's major newspapers was that Mr. Griffin lost heavily on points."

In a press conference held on 23 October, Griffin stated that he would make a formal complaint about the format of the programme, which he said was "... not a genuine Question Time; that was a lynch mob". He suggested that he should appear again, but that "... [we] should do it properly, and talk about the issues of the day", and added, "That audience was taken from a city that is no longer British ... That was not my country any more. Why not come down and do it in Thurrock, do it in Stoke, do it in Burnley? Do it somewhere where there are still significant numbers of English and British people, and they haven't been ethnically cleansed from their own country."

== Policies and views ==
Griffin describes himself as a "moderniser", and "new nationalist", and after his election as leader of the BNP, according to The Guardian contributor Francis Wheen, was "contemptuous" of the party's traditional supporters. He changed the BNP's traditional focus on immigration and race, to a defence of what it sees as "our traditional principles against the politically correct agenda" espoused by mainstream politicians. He has portrayed himself as a defender of free speech, and has repeatedly spoken out against multiculturalism. During 2000, he attempted to further the BNP's popular appeal by targeting specific groups, including lorry drivers—some of whom were at the time engaged in mass protests against fuel prices—and farmers. The BNP also produced a journal devoted to rural matters.

The BNP's constitution grants its chairman full executive power over all party affairs, and Griffin thus carried sole responsibility for the party's legal and financial liabilities, and had the final say in all decisions affecting the party.

Upon his election to the European Parliament Griffin unsuccessfully tried to form an alliance with right-wing parties, which would have entitled the group members to extra funding. He also held talks with other far-right European parties, such as Vlaams Belang and Jobbik. The BNP maintains ties with Roberto Fiore and fascist groups across Europe. Griffin criticised Gordon Brown's Labour government for its attitude towards the BNP, accusing it of treating elected representatives of the BNP as "second-class citizens". Following his election, in a press conference held at a public house in Manchester, he criticised the privatisation of national industries, such as the railway network, and accused MPs generally of being involved in this "... giant looting of Britain". He accused private corporations and the "ruling elite" in Britain of building a "Eurocratic state", a process he called "Mussolini fascism ... under Gordon Brown." He supported the Gurkhas, stating that the BNP would allow them and their families entry to the country for medical treatment "for as long as they needed treatment, or for as long as they lived." He also suggested the removal of 100,000 Muslims "disloyal to Britain" and their replacement with the Gurkhas.

After assuming control of the party, Griffin sought to move it away from its historic identity, although on the BBC's Newsnight on 26 June 2001 he stated that Hindus and whites had both been targeted in the "Muslim" riots of 2001, and in the August 2001 issue of Identity (a BNP publication) he said that radical Muslim clerics wanted "... militant Muslims to take over British cities with AK-47 rifles". On The Politics Show on 9 March 2003, he appeared to accept ethnic minorities who were already legally living in the country, and, on 6 March 2008, he was again interviewed on Newsnight; when told of a poll that demonstrated that most working-class Britons were more concerned about drugs and alcohol than immigration, he linked the UK's drug problem with Islam, specifically Pakistani immigrants. His inclusion on the programme was criticised by contributor and radio presenter Jon Gaunt, who branded the decision as "pathetic". When asked by The Times about concerns that his recent success was presaged in Enoch Powell's Rivers of Blood speech, Griffin replied:

The divisions are already there. They were created by that monstrous experiment: the multi-cultural destruction of old Britain. There is no clash between the indigenous population and, for instance, settled West Indians, Sikhs and Hindus. There is, however, an enormous correlation between high BNP votes and nearby Islamic populations. The reason for that is nothing to do with Islamophobia; it is issues such as the grooming of young English girls for sex by a criminal minority of the Muslim population ... I am now there to give political articulation to the concerns of the mainly indigenous population. The ethnic populations have always had Labour to speak up for them. Finally their neighbours have got someone who speaks up for them.

In a June 2009 interview with Channel 4 News, Griffin claimed that "There's no such thing as a black Welshman", which was criticised by Vaughan Gething, the first black president of the Welsh NUS and the Welsh TUC, and the first black candidate for the National Assembly for Wales. Commenting on Griffin's claim, he said "on that basis, most white people wouldn't qualify. It's quite clear that Nick Griffin just doesn't accept that black British people or black Welsh people are entitled to call themselves proper, full citizens of the country." Griffin's interview with Channel 4 News was in response to a decision by the Equality and Human Rights Commission to investigate the BNP's membership criteria, which, it stated, "appeared to discriminate on the grounds of race and colour, contrary to the Race Relations Act." He rejected claims that the BNP was "acting unlawfully" and said "... because we are here, as it was pointed out, for specific ethnic groups—it's nothing to do with colour, your reporter there said that we'll only lift a finger for white people—that's a simple lie."

Following the Admiral Duncan pub bombing by former BNP member David Copeland, Griffin stated "The TV footage of dozens of 'gay' demonstrators flaunting their perversion in front of the world's journalists showed just why so many ordinary people find these creatures so repulsive." The BNP states that, privately, homosexuality should be tolerated, but that it "should not be promoted or encouraged". It opposed the introduction of civil partnerships and wishes to ban what it perceives as the promotion of homosexuality in schools and the media. A series of messages he posted in October 2012 on the social network Twitter, regarding a discrimination claim won by a gay couple, sparked widespread opprobrium. Cambridgeshire police investigated the tweets, which included the couple's address and a suggestion that a "British Justice team" would give them "a bit of drama", but took no further action.

In 2012, although he denied being "anti-gay", he said that civil partnerships undermined "the institution of marriage, and as a result of that, children will die over the next few years, because they'll be brought up in homes which aren't married". In 2009, he also said that "a lot of people find the sight of two grown men kissing in public really creepy. I understand that homosexuals don't understand that but that's how a lot of us feel." He also suggests that gay pride marches "[verge] on heterophobia which, like its twin Christianophobia, is on the rise."

Writing for The Rune, Griffin praised the wartime Waffen SS and criticised the Royal Air Force for its bombing of Nazi Germany. At Coventry Cathedral, he distributed leaflets that referred to "mass murder" during the Second World War bombing of Dresden.

=== Fourteen Words ===
In the 1990s Griffin stated his political ideology could be summed up by the Fourteen Words, which are usually quoted as: "We must secure the existence of our people and a future for white children". During a police interview in 1998, he said that "everything I do is related to building a nationalist movement through which [...] those 14 words can be carried out".

=== Global warming ===
In a BBC interview on 8 June 2009, Griffin said that "global warming is essentially a hoax" and that it "is being exploited by the liberal elite as a means of taxing and controlling us and the real crisis is peak oil". He was a representative of the European Parliament at the 2009 UN Climate Change Conference, where he repeated his claim that global warming is a hoax, and called advocates of action on climate change such as Al Gore "mass murderers" by supporting biofuels, claiming that their use would lead to the "third and the greatest famine of the modern era". A Greenpeace spokesman said, "In reality the environmental and development groups he has been disparaging have been in the forefront of concerns about biofuels. Griffin's claims that climate change is a hoax is one of many curious things going on between his ears."

=== Holocaust and Zionism ===
His comments on the Holocaust (which he once referred to as "the Holohoax") made as an editor of The Rune demonstrate negationism. He criticised Holocaust denier David Irving for admitting that up to four million Jews might have died in the Holocaust; he wrote "True Revisionists will not be fooled by this new twist to the sorry tale of The Hoax of the Twentieth Century." In 1997, he told an undercover journalist that he had updated Richard Verrall's booklet Did Six Million Really Die? and, in the same year, he wrote Who are the Mindbenders?, about a perceived domination of the media by Jewish figures. Despite this, the BNP had a Jewish councillor in the early 2000s, Patricia Richardson, and spokesman Phil Edwards has stated that the party also has Jewish members. In 2007, the BNP stated that it did not deny the Holocaust, and that "dredging up quotes from 10, 15, 20 years ago is really pathetic and, in a sense, rather fascist." In an interview with the BNP deputy leader Simon Darby, Griffin said that the rival English Defence League was a "Zionist false flag operation", and added that the organisation is "a neo-con operation".

In 2009, Griffin described the BNP as "the only political party which, in the clashes between Israel and Gaza, stood full-square behind Israel's right to deal with Hamas terrorists." In 2019, Griffin was reportedly part of a delegation which met a senior official from the proscribed terrorist group Hezbollah, which has committed attacks on Israeli civilians and is suspected of having been involved in attacks on Jewish targets outside Israel.

=== Migrant crisis ===
In an interview with the BBC on 8 July 2009, during a discussion on European immigration, he proposed that the EU should sink boats carrying illegal immigrants, to prevent them from entering Europe. Although the interviewer, BBC correspondent Shirin Wheeler, implied that Griffin may have wished the EU to "murder people at sea", he quickly corrected her by saying: "I didn't say anyone should be murdered at sea—I say boats should be sunk, they can throw them a life raft and they can go back to Libya" (a staging post for migrants from Egypt and sub-Saharan Africa).

== Personal life ==
Griffin lives with his family in Welshpool. He is married to Jackie Griffin, a former nurse who also acts as his assistant; the couple have four children, some of whom have been actively involved with the party. He was declared bankrupt in January 2014. In March 2017, Griffin expressed a desire to emigrate to Hungary within six months. In May 2017, Griffin was banned from Hungary as he was perceived to be a "national security threat", according to security sources cited in the Hungarian weekly newspaper Magyar Narancs.

== Elections contested ==
UK Parliament elections

Date of election	Constituency	Party	Votes	%	Source(s)
22 October 1981 by-election	Croydon North West	National Front	429	1.2	
1983 general election	Croydon North West	National Front	336	0.9	
23 November 2000 by-election	West Bromwich West	BNP	794	4.2	
2001 general election	Oldham West and Royton	BNP	6,552	16.4	
2005 general election	Keighley	BNP	4,240	9.2	
2010 general election	Barking	BNP	6,620	14.6	

Welsh Assembly elections (Additional members region; party list)

Date of election	Region	Party	Votes	%	Result	Source(s)
2007 Welsh Assembly election	South Wales West	BNP	8,993	5.5	Not elected	

European Parliament elections (Multi-member constituency; party list)

Date of election	Region	Party	Votes	%	Result	Source(s)
2004 European election	North West England	BNP	134,959	6.4	Not elected	
2009 European election	North West England	BNP	132,094	8.0	Elected	
2014 European election	North West England	BNP	32,826	1.9	Not elected	

Party political offices
Preceded by John Tyndall	Chairman of the British National Party; 1999–2014	Succeeded by Adam Walker
