= William Mason, 1st Baron Blackford =

British politician and public servant

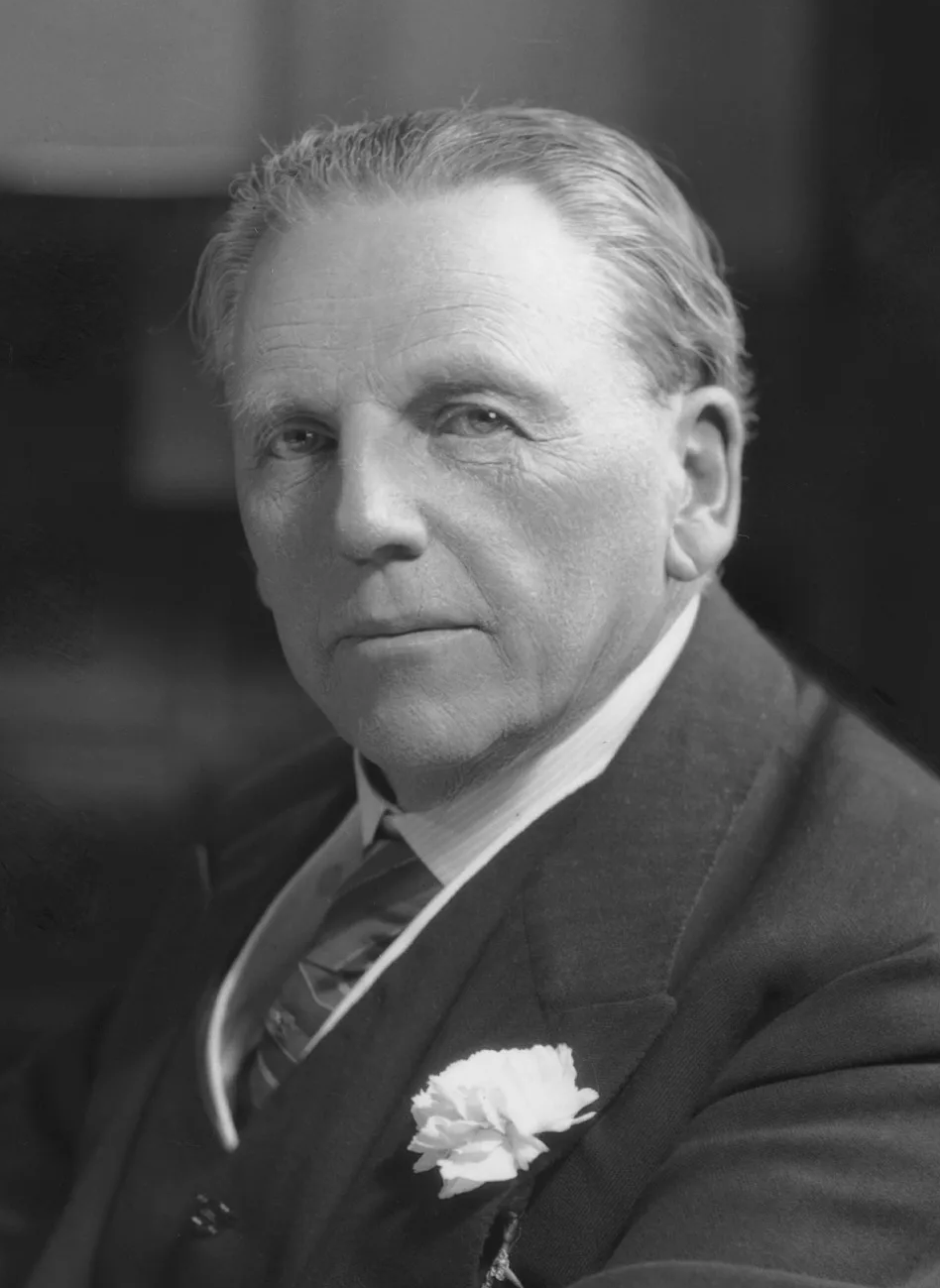
Mason in 1930

William James Peake Mason, 1st Baron Blackford JP (11 November 1862 – 21 July 1947), known as Sir William Mason, Bt, between 1918 and 1935, was a British politician and public servant.

Mason was the son of George Holt Mason, of Broadwater, Tunbridge Wells, Kent, and Laura Mary, daughter of Charles John Moakes. He was called to the Bar, Middle Temple, in 1891. He tried four times to enter Parliament as a Conservative candidate; he unsuccessfully contested South Somerset in 1900, North Somerset in 1906, and Finsbury East in both general elections of 1910.

During the First World War he was Chairman of Executive of the British Ambulance Committee and was created a Baronet in 1918 for "public and local services". Mason was also a Justice of the Peace for Somerset and served as High Sheriff of Somerset in 1928. In 1935 he was raised to the peerage as Baron Blackford, of Compton Pauncefoot in the County of Somerset, for "political and public services in the County of Somerset". There is no record of him having ever spoken in the House of Lords.

Lord Blackford married Edith, daughter of Alexander Murray Affleck, in 1885. He died in July 1947, aged 84, and was succeeded in the baronetcy and barony by his son, Glyn. Lady Blackford died in May 1958.

Baronetage of the United Kingdom
New creation	Baronet (of Compton Pauncefoot); 1918–1947	Succeeded by Glyn Mason
Peerage of the United Kingdom
New creation	Baron Blackford; 1935–1947	Succeeded by Glyn Mason
