= Humfrey Malins =

British politician

Humfrey Malins CBE

Member of Parliament for Woking
- In office 1 May 1997 – 12 April 2010
- Preceded by: Cranley Onslow
- Succeeded by: Jonathan Lord

Member of Parliament for Croydon North West
- In office 9 June 1983 – 16 March 1992
- Preceded by: Bill Pitt
- Succeeded by: Malcolm Wicks

Personal details
- Born: 31 July 1945 (age 81) Nuneaton, Warwickshire, England
- Party: Conservative
- Spouse: Lynda Malins
- Relations: Julian Malins KC (brother)
- Education: Brasenose College, Oxford

Humfrey Jonathon Malins CBE (born 31 July 1945) is a British Conservative Party politician, who was Member of Parliament (MP) for Croydon North West and later Woking.

== Early life and career ==
Malins was born in Nuneaton, Warwickshire and educated at St John's School, Leatherhead and Brasenose College, Oxford; he gained an MA in Jurisprudence in 1967. He qualified as a solicitor in 1971 and worked in a major Surrey law firm from 1975 to 1988. From 1973 to 1983, Malins was a member of Mole Valley District Council.

He contested Liverpool Toxteth in both 1974 general elections and Lewisham East in the 1979 general election.

== Parliamentary career ==
In the 1983 general election, Malins was elected MP for Croydon North West, defeating Bill Pitt who had been the constituency's MP since the 1981 by-election. Malins spent most of his first period as an MP on the backbenches, but was Parliamentary Private Secretary to Tim Renton from 1987 to 1989 and then Virginia Bottomley from 1989 to 1992.

In the 1992 general election, he was defeated for re-election by the Labour candidate Malcolm Wicks. In 1993, he founded the Immigration Advisory Service, a charitable organisation providing free legal advice on immigration and asylum issues. He became a District Judge in 1991 and in 1996 became a Recorder at the Crown Court. In 1997 he was made a commander of the Order of the British Empire for services to immigration policy.

At the 1997 general election, he was selected for the safe Conservative seat of Woking. On his return to Parliament, he became a member of the Home Affairs Select Committee.

Malins supported Kenneth Clarke's failed bid in the 2001 leadership contest, but nonetheless was appointed to Iain Duncan Smith's front bench team as a junior home affairs spokesman.

In March 2003, he resigned from the opposition front bench in protest at their support of the Invasion of Iraq. He was later re-appointed to the front bench as a shadow home affairs minister when Michael Howard became leader in November 2003, but returned to the backbenches under David Cameron.

He announced in March 2009 his intention to stand down, and left parliament at the 2010 general election.

== Personal life ==
He married Lynda on 21 July 1979 in Greenwich. They have a son Harry and daughter, Katherine.

Parliament of the United Kingdom
Preceded by Bill Pitt	Member of Parliament for Croydon North West; 1983–1992	Succeeded by Malcolm Wicks
Preceded by Cranley Onslow	Member of Parliament for Woking; 1997–2010	Succeeded by Jonathan Lord
