= Henry Willink =

British politician and public servant

The Right Honourable Sir Henry Willink MC, PC, QC
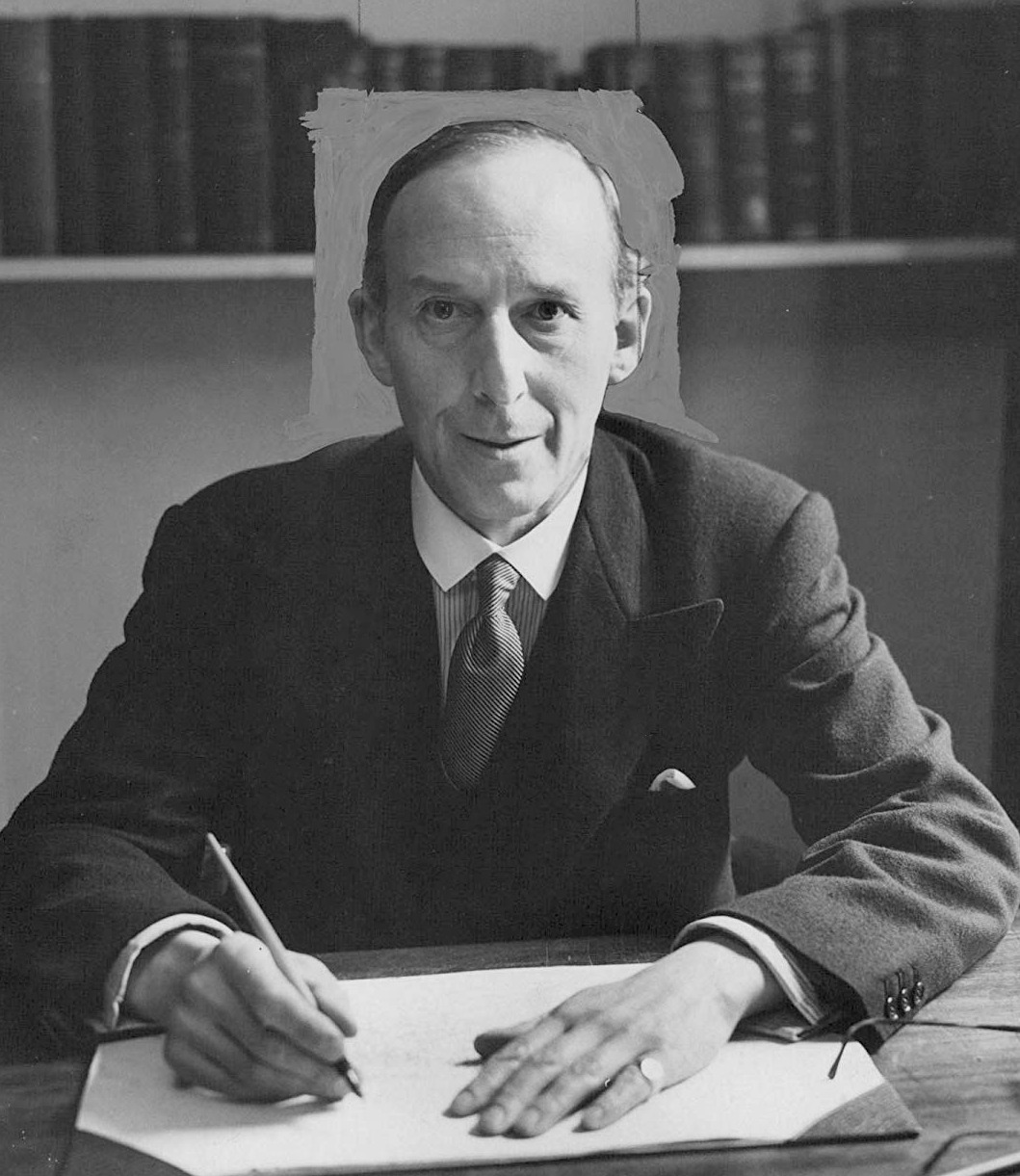
- Willink in 1948

Minister of Health
- In office 1943–1945
- Preceded by: Ernest Brown
- Succeeded by: Aneurin Bevan

Member of Parliament for Croydon North
- In office 19 June 1940 – 29 January 1948
- Preceded by: Glyn Mason
- Succeeded by: Fred Harris

Personal details
- Born: Henry Willink; 7 March 1894 Liverpool, Lancashire
- Died: 20 July 1973 (aged 79)
- Party: Conservative

Sir Henry Urmston Willink, 1st Baronet, MC, QC (7 March 1894 – 20 July 1973) was a British politician and public servant. A Conservative Member of Parliament from 1940, he became Minister of Health in 1943. During his time in power he was appointed Special Commissioner for those made homeless by the London Blitz and was involved with the production of the Beveridge Report.

The details of the report proposed a comprehensive free healthcare system, this led to the white paper A National Health Service, published in 1944, suggesting the creation of such a service, which did not include the nationalisation of hospitals. Such a policy was later implemented by the Labour Party through the creation of the National Health Service which differed from the proposals suggested by Willink. At the time he claimed the nationalisation of voluntary hospitals "will destroy so much in this country that we value".

== Early life and wartime service ==
Willink was born in Liverpool. He was educated as a King's Scholar at Eton College, where he won the Newcastle Scholarship in 1912, and at Trinity College, Cambridge. Before he could take his Cambridge degree, he volunteered for service in the Royal Field Artillery during the First World War. When aged only 22, Willink commanded a battery at the 1916 Battle of the Somme. Willink received the Military Cross and the Croix de Guerre. Post-war, he was called to the Bar by the Inner Temple in 1920, was appointed to the rank of King's Counsel in 1935 and became a Bencher in 1942.

== Political career ==
In 1938 Willink stood as a Conservative in Ipswich to replace the incumbent MP John Ganzoni, but lost to Richard Stokes.

Willink was elected as Member of Parliament (MP) for Croydon North in a wartime by-election on 19 June 1940. There was only one other candidate, an independent, who received a very small vote. In 1940, he was appointed Special Commissioner for the homeless in London.

Willink was made a privy counsellor in 1943, the year he became Minister of Health, a role in which he served until the Conservatives lost the 1945 general election. Willink, with John Hawton, was responsible for the 1944 White Paper, following the Beveridge Report, called A National Health Service. It proposed the creation of a fully comprehensive, universal healthcare system, free of charge and available to all citizens irrespective of means.

When Labour came into office in 1945, it presented its own plan in preference to Willink's, which it had supported. The principal difference was that Willink's plan talked of a "publicly organised" rather than a "publicly provided" service, and Labour's plan brought hospitals into full national ownership. Willink's successor Nye Bevan, however, made concessions to General practitioners.

Willink kept his seat at the 1945 general election by just 607 votes over Labour's Marion Billson. Turnout was low and there were rumours of sacks of servicemen's votes left uncounted in the Town Hall basement. Labour's David Rees-Williams - later Baron Ogmore - had taken the other Croydon seat.

Willink resigned from Parliament on 29 January 1948. The subsequent by-election was won resoundingly by Conservative Fred Harris, with a majority of almost 12,000 votes, despite a ballot of high-profile candidates.

== Later life ==
In 1948, he was appointed Master of Magdalene College, Cambridge, a post he held until 1966. From 1953 until 1955 he was also Vice-Chancellor of the University of Cambridge. He chaired the steering committee leading to the formation of the Royal College of General Practitioners, starting in 1952. Willink later described his role as Chairman of that Steering Committee as "one of the very best projects with which I have ever been involved in my life."

In 1957, Willink served as Chairman of the Inter-Departmental Committee on the Future Numbers of Medical Practitioners and Intakes of Medical Students. The committee concluded that too many doctors were being trained and proposed a 12% reduction. That was soon realised to be a misjudgement. From 1955 to 1971, he held the office of Dean of Arches, the senior ecclesiastical judge of England.

== Honours ==
He was made a baronet, of Dingle Bank in the City of Liverpool, in 1957, and was awarded an honorary LLD by the University of Melbourne in 1955. His papers are held at Churchill College, Cambridge.

=== Arms ===
Coat of arms of Henry Willink
Crest Issuant from a wreath of oak leaves Or a dexter cubit arm bendwise grasping in the hand a chaplet of laurel Proper. Escutcheon Azure three acorns on one stem slipped Or. Motto Fides Et Amo

Parliament of the United Kingdom
Preceded by Glyn Mason	Member of Parliament for Croydon North; 1940–1948	Succeeded by Fred Harris
Political offices
Preceded by Ernest Brown	Minister of Health; 1943–1945	Succeeded by Aneurin Bevan
Baronetage of the United Kingdom
New creation	Baronet (of Dingle Bank); 1957–1973	Succeeded by Charles William Willink
Academic offices
Preceded by Allen Ramsay	Master of Magdalene College, Cambridge; 1947–1966	Succeeded by Walter Hamilton
Preceded by Sir Lionel Whitby	Vice-Chancellor of the University of Cambridge; 1953–1955	Succeeded by Brian Downs
