= Compton Pauncefoot =

Village and civil parish in Somerset, England

Coordinates: 51.0367°N 2.5076°W

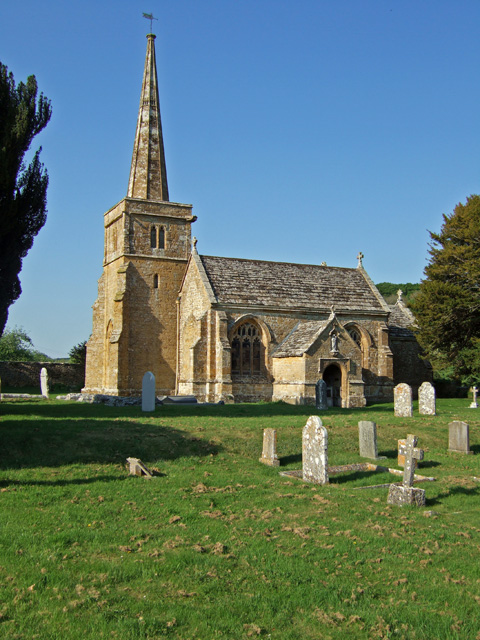
- Church of the Blessed Virgin Mary

- Location within Somerset
- Population: 139 (2011)
- OS grid reference: ST645265
- Civil parish: Compton Pauncefoot
- Unitary authority: Somerset Council
- Ceremonial county: Somerset
- Region: South West
- Country: England
- Sovereign state: United Kingdom
- Post town: YEOVIL
- Postcode district: BA22
- Dialling code: 01963
- Police: Avon and Somerset
- Fire: Devon and Somerset
- Ambulance: South Western
- UK Parliament: Glastonbury and Somerton

Compton Pauncefoot is a village and civil parish in Somerset, England, situated beside the A303 road, 5 miles (8.0 km) south west of Wincanton in the South Somerset district. The parish had a population of 139 in 2011. The civil parish also includes the village with Blackford (located one mile to the east) and therefore population is based on the two villages together. Blackford parish was merged with Compton Pauncefoot on 1 April 1933. The civil parish holds a Parish Meeting twice a year and has no Parish Council.

There are approximately 35 houses in the village of Compton Pauncefoot and a similar number in Blackford. Compton Pauncefoot is a designated Conservation Area. The civil parish is in the Blackmore Vale ward of South Somerset District Council and Somerset County Council.

== History ==
The name of the village is believed to come from 'compton', or narrow valley, belonging to a Norman knight called Pauncefote ('Fat-bellied').

The parish was part of the hundred of Catsash.

Baron Blackford, of Compton Pauncefoot in the County of Somerset, was a title in the Peerage of the United Kingdom. It was created in 1935 for the barrister William Mason. He had already been created a Baronet, of Compton Pauncefoot in the County of Somerset, in the Baronetage of the United Kingdom in 1918. The titles became extinct in 1988 on the death of his great-grandson, the fourth Baron.

== Geography ==
The stream through Compton Pauncefoot is a tributary of the River Cam (Somerset). It travels under the A303 to join the Yarlington headwaters. The River Cam flows onto the Royal Naval Station where it joins the River Yeo and the Yeo in turn flows west to the south of Yeovilton and through the town of Ilchester. The river course continues to the west and at Langport becomes the River Parrett.

The stream has its headwaters in the hills around Blackford & Compton Pauncefoot together with a number of springs. The main waters come from 3 primary sources: 1. Maperton, 2. Quarry Hill, 3. Sigwells Hill. The first 2 combine in Blackford around the Crossroads/Hollow and further springs contribute at a number of points all the way through both villages. The A303 is nearby and during construction major drainage pipes were laid at intervals that bring significant quantities of water into the stream. This contributes to the rapid rise in the stream during rainfall.

== Governance ==
The parish has no parish council and has a Parish Meeting which has limited responsibility for local issues, including setting an annual precept (local rate) to cover very limited permitted expenditure (basically minimal operating expenses and contribution to burial authority) and producing annual accounts for public scrutiny. The parish meeting helps evaluate local planning applications and works with the local police, district council officers, and neighbourhood watch groups on matters of crime, security, and traffic. The parish meeting's role also includes liaising with the district council over projects for the maintenance and repair of parish facilities, as well as consulting with the district council on the maintenance, repair, and improvement of highways, drainage, footpaths, public transport, and street cleaning. Conservation matters (including trees and listed buildings) and environmental issues are also matters that the parish meeting has a say on but no formal responsibility.

For local government purposes, since 1 April 2023, the parish comes under the unitary authority of Somerset Council. Prior to this, it was part of the non-metropolitan district of South Somerset (established under the Local Government Act 1972). It was part of Wincanton Rural District before 1974.

It is also part of the Glastonbury and Somerton, a county constituency represented in the House of Commons of the Parliament of the United Kingdom. It elects one Member of Parliament (MP) by the first past the post system of election.

== Landmarks ==
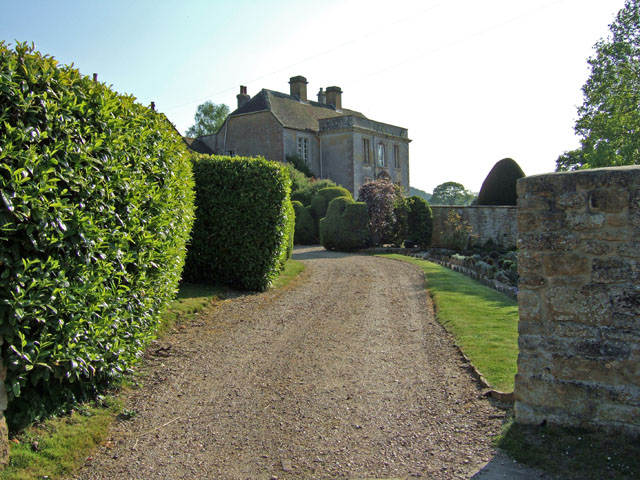
The Old Rectory

Compton Castle was built for John Hubert Hunt about 1825, in a Gothic style with large grounds, gatehouse, and lawns stretching down to a lake.

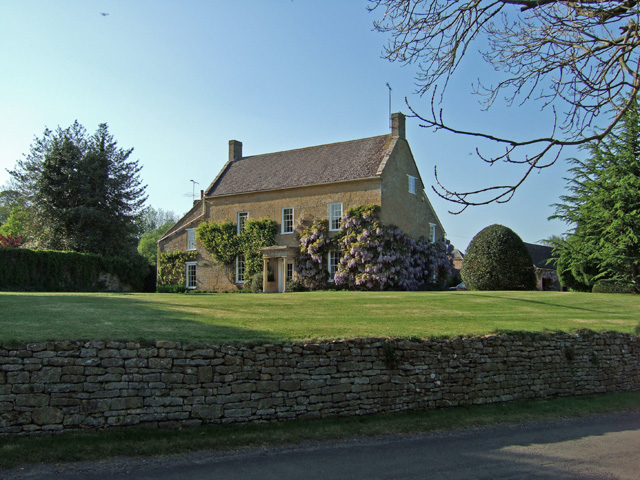
Manor House

It was sold in 1986 by the Showering family (of Babycham fame).

It should not be confused with Compton Castle (a fortified manor house in the village of Compton, about 5 miles (8.0 km) west of Torquay).

The Old Rectory has Georgian, additions to an earlier building. Recently this house and the church were used quite extensively in a serialised version of Jane Austen's Mansfield Park.

The mainly 18th-century Manor House includes parts which date back to the 15th century.

The Crescent is a quarter circle of cottages built in about 1815 for farm workers, and originally known as Waterloo Crescent.

== Religious sites ==
The church dates from the 15th century and is built of hamstone. In 1485 Sir Walter Pauncefoot left money for the building of the church and for a chantry at Compton Pauncefoot, where a priest could pray daily for his soul and for those of his immediate family. He also left several yards of differently coloured silks to be made into vestments. Until 1864 the church comprised a nave with south aisle and porch, and a tower at the west. The inner arches of the tower carried a spire of graceful proportions. The north aisle was added in 1864, and at the same time the two stone coffins (now in the churchyard by the yew tree) were removed.

The interior of the church can be viewed here and here. The font is 13th-century and is perfectly plain. There is a mass dial on the south wall. The frieze in the south aisle has part of a stone inscribed "Anne Whyting 1535." In the wall under the sill of the adjacent window is a long stone panel divided into compartments, each containing a shield bearing coats of arms relating to the Whyting and Pauncefoot families.

The south wall of the chancel contains a piscina with a stone button in the centre of the bowl. Five stained glass windows in the church are signed — a rare phenomenon — by Jean-Baptiste Capronnier of Brussels. The west window is by Charles Eamer Kempe, 1896. The church's three bells were cast in 1627, and one of them has the royal arms inscribed. The chancel was panelled with oak in 1934. The church registers date from 1559.

The top of the spire became unsafe, and an appeal was launched in 1980, with the help of grants from the Department of the Environment and the Historic Churches Preservation Trust. These efforts raised £18,000 for the necessary work to be carried out. The church has been designated by English Heritage as a Grade II* listed building. The church is part of the Camelot Group of Parishes in the Diocese of Bath & Wells.
