= 1948 Croydon North by-election =

UK parliamentary by-election

The 1948 Croydon North by-election was a parliamentary by-election held in the British House of Commons constituency of Croydon North on 11 March 1948. The seat had become vacant when the Conservative Member of Parliament Henry Willink had resigned, having held the seat since a by-election in 1940.

The Labour Party candidate was the British politician, diplomat, historian, diarist, novelist, lecturer, journalist, broadcaster, and gardener Harold Nicolson. Formerly a political ally of Oswald Mosley in the New Party before the later turned to Fascism, Nicolson had previously sat in the 1935–1945 parliament as a National Labour MP. These were the followers of former British Prime Minister Ramsay MacDonald who had been expelled from the Labour Party for forming the first National Government with Conservatives and Liberals without consulting them.

The Conservative candidate Fred Harris held the seat for his party with a much increased majority. The seat had only been marginally Conservative in the 1945 election.

== Result ==
1948 Croydon North by-election
Party	Candidate	Votes	%	±%
Conservative	Fred Harris	36,200	54.0	+13.9
Labour	Harold Nicolson	24,536	36.6	−3.5
Liberal	Don Bennett	6,321	9.4	−9.4
Majority		11,664	17.4	+16.3
Turnout		67,057	74.8	+1.4
Registered electors				
Conservative hold		Swing	+8.7	

== Previous result ==
General election 1945: Croydon North
Party	Candidate	Votes	%	±%
Conservative	Henry Willink	23,417	41.1	−26.0
Labour	Marion Billson	22,810	40.1	+7.2
Liberal	John Howard	10,714	18.8	New
Majority		607	1.0	−33.1
Turnout		56,941	73.4	+8.8
Registered electors		77,594		
Conservative hold		Swing	-16.6	

== See also ==
- Croydon North (UK Parliament constituency)
- 1940 Croydon North by-election
- Lists of United Kingdom by-elections
