= 1940 Croydon North by-election =

UK parliamentary by-election

The 1940 Croydon North by-election was a parliamentary by-election held in the House of Commons constituency of Croydon North on 19 June 1940. The seat had become vacant when the Conservative Member of Parliament Glyn Mason had resigned. Mason had held the seat since the 1922 general election.

During World War II, the major parties had formed a Coalition Government and agreed an electoral pact, whereby they would not contest by-elections in seats held by the other parties in the government. However, there was nothing to prevent other candidates from standing, and A. L. Lucas stood in Croydon North as an independent candidate.

Despite a very low turnout, the Conservative candidate Henry Willink held the seat for his party with a large majority. Lucas forfeited his deposit.

== Result ==
1940 Croydon North by-election
| Party | Candidate | Votes | % | ±% |
|---|---|---|---|---|
| Conservative | Henry Willink | 14,163 | 90.7 | +23.6 |
| Independent | Arthur Lascelles Lucas | 1,445 | 9.3 | New |
| Majority | | 12,718 | 81.4 | +47.2 |
| Turnout | | 15,608 | 18.3 | −46.3 |
| Registered electors | | | | |
| Conservative hold | | Swing | | |

== Previous result ==
General election 1935: Croydon North
| Party | Candidate | Votes | % | ±% |
|---|---|---|---|---|
| Conservative | Glyn Mason | 36,383 | 67.1 | −13.8 |
| Labour | Frank Mitchell | 17,872 | 32.9 | +13.8 |
| Majority | | 18,511 | 34.2 | −27.5 |
| Turnout | | 54,255 | 64.6 | −4.8 |
| Registered electors | | 83,986 | | |
| Conservative hold | | Swing | -13.8 | |

== See also ==
- Croydon North (UK Parliament constituency)
- 1948 Croydon North by-election
- Lists of United Kingdom by-elections
