= Malcolm Wicks =

British politician and academic (1947–2012)

The Right Honourable Malcolm Wicks
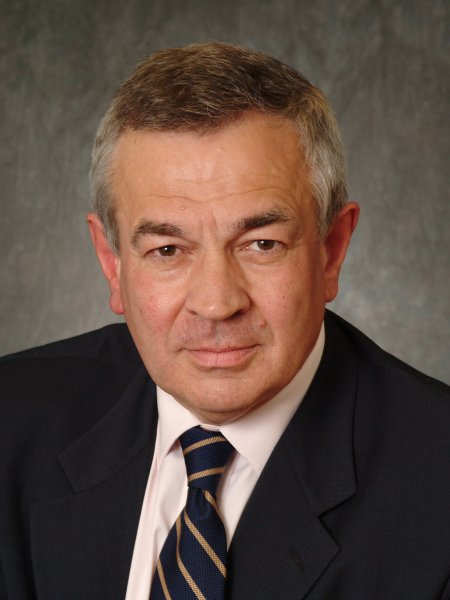
- Wicks in 2005

Minister of State for Energy
- In office 28 June 2007 – 5 October 2008
- Prime Minister: Gordon Brown
- Preceded by: The Lord Truscott
- Succeeded by: Mike O'Brien
- In office 11 May 2005 – 10 November 2006
- Prime Minister: Tony Blair
- Preceded by: Mike O'Brien
- Succeeded by: The Lord Truscott

Minister of State for Science and Innovation
- In office 10 November 2006 – 28 June 2007
- Prime Minister: Tony Blair
- Preceded by: The Lord Sainsbury of Turville
- Succeeded by: Ian Pearson

Minister of State for Pensions
- In office 13 June 2003 – 6 May 2005
- Prime Minister: Tony Blair
- Preceded by: Ian McCartney
- Succeeded by: Stephen Timms

Member of Parliament for Croydon North Croydon North West (1992–1997)
- In office 9 April 1992 – 29 September 2012
- Preceded by: Humfrey Malins
- Succeeded by: Steve Reed

Personal details
- Born: 1 July 1947 Hatfield, Hertfordshire, England
- Died: 29 September 2012 (aged 65) London, England
- Party: Labour
- Spouse: Margaret Wicks
- Education: University of North London, London School of Economics
- Profession: Academic

Malcolm Hunt Wicks (1 July 1947 – 29 September 2012) was a British Labour Party politician and academic specialising in social policy. He was a member of parliament (MP) from 1992, first for Croydon North West and then for Croydon North, until his death in 2012.

== Early life and education ==
Wicks was born in Hatfield, Hertfordshire, to Arthur Wicks, a Labour member of the London County Council and later Greater London Council. He was educated at the independent Elizabeth College, Guernsey; North West London Polytechnic and the London School of Economics gaining a BSc in Sociology.

== Early career ==
From 1968 to 1970, he was a research fellow of the Department of Social Administration at the University of York, then a research worker at the Centre for Environmental Studies from 1970 to 1972. Wicks worked in the Urban Deprivation Unit (abolished in 1978) of the Home Office as a social policy analyst from 1974 to 1977, and was a lecturer in Social Administration at Brunel University from 1970 to 1974. From 1977 to 1978, he was a lecturer in Social Policy at the Civil Service College (now called the National School of Government) in Ascot, then research director and secretary of the Study Commission on the Family from 1978 to 1983. He was later Director of the Family Policy Studies Centre from 1983 to 1992. He was the author and co-author of many publications, including Old and Cold: hypothermia and social policy and A Future for All: Do we need the Welfare State? His keen concern about fuel poverty led to him to act as a Trustee of the National Energy Foundation (1988–94).

He was involved in politics in Croydon, chairing his local Constituency Labour Party and standing for election to Croydon Council before his election to Parliament.

It was only revealed in his posthumous memoirs that in 1976 Wicks had leaked Cabinet papers to Frank Field at the Child Poverty Action Group. This action proved decisive in preventing the Callaghan government from introducing means testing of child benefit.

== Parliamentary career ==
He was first elected in 1992 for Croydon North West after having previously contested the seat unsuccessfully in 1987.

Wicks was one of the few MPs whose Private Member's Bill reached the statute books, with the Carers (Recognition and Services) Act 1995 recognising the needs of family carers.

He was Chairman of the Education Select Committee from 1998 until his July 1999 appointment as Minister for Lifelong Learning in the Department for Education and Employment. In July 2001, he moved to the Department for Work and Pensions, where he spent four years, first as Parliamentary Under Secretary of State, and then as Minister of State for Pensions. In May 2005, he was appointed as Minister for Energy at the Department of Trade and Industry in the post-election Cabinet reshuffle. In a mini-reshuffle on 10 November 2006, following the retirement of Lord Sainsbury, Wicks was appointed as Minister of State for Science and Innovation in the same department.

In Gordon Brown's first reshuffle on 28 June 2007, Wicks was moved to the Department for Business, Enterprise and Regulatory Reform, which replaced the Department of Trade and Industry, to resume his old role as Minister for Energy. It is reported that Wicks was intended to serve in the cabinet, but the post-it note bearing his name and position fell onto the floor. He was a vice-president of Carers UK and the Alzheimer's Society. Wicks stood down from the government in October 2008 for issues relating to a decommissioning scheme at Sellafield, accepting an appointment to the Privy Council and becoming the Prime Minister's special representative on international energy issues. He emerged with an enhanced reputation during the MPs expenses scandal being deemed a "parliamentary angel."

Wicks was re-elected as the MP for Croydon North on 6 May 2010 with an increased majority of 16,483.

== Death ==
Wicks died on 29 September 2012, aged 65. He had been suffering from cancer.

== Personal life ==
Wicks married Margaret Baron in 1968 and they had a son and two daughters.

Parliament of the United Kingdom
Preceded by Humfrey Malins	Member of Parliament for Croydon North West; 1992–1997	Constituency abolished
New constituency	Member of Parliament for Croydon North; 1997–2012	Succeeded by Steve Reed
