= Chidi Ngwaba =

British Seventh-day Adventist doctor

- Born: 1970 (age 55–56)
- Occupation: Doctor

Chidi Ngwaba (known as Dr Chidi) is a British Seventh-day Adventist doctor who specialises in lifestyle medicine and plant-based nutrition.

== Career ==
Ngwaba trained in surgery and lifestyle medicine at Johns Hopkins University and University College London. He worked at Royal Free Hospital. He is a founding board member of the European Society of Lifestyle Medicine. He is founding director of a lifestyle medicine clinic on Harley Street and resident doctor at Premier Radio.

In 2002, Ngwaba established a vegetarian restaurant with his wife Uchenna known as "Plant" on Poland Street, Soho. It was described as "the UK's first fast-food takeaway dedicated to vegetarian food".

Nhwaba is an international speaker on health and wellness and has appeared on television including ITV's Good Morning Britain and Sky News. He is an advocate of plant-based nutrition and is an ambassador of Plant-Based Health Professionals UK.

== Personal life ==
Ngwaba is of Nigerian descent and as a child lived in a foster home in Brighton. He is married to Uchenna who ran her own dentistry practice on Fleet Street. Despite running a vegetarian restaurant in the past, neither Ngwaba or his wife are vegetarian. In the 2000s Ngwaba avoided red meat but ate chicken and fish. More recently he has defended the health benefits of a vegan diet.

=== Politics ===
He was selected as the Brexit Party candidate for the parliamentary seat of Croydon North in the 2019 general election.

=== Religion ===
Ngwaba is an ordained elder within the Seventh-day Adventist church and was awarded an honorary Leadership Award for Adventist Health Educator in 2016.
