= Baron Blackford =

Extinct barony in the Peerage of the United Kingdom

Baron Blackford, of Compton Pauncefoot in the County of Somerset, was a title in the Peerage of the United Kingdom. It was created in 1935 for the politician, public servant and magistrate Sir William Mason, 1st Baronet. He had already been created a Baronet, of Compton Pauncefoot in the County Somerset, in the Baronetage of the United Kingdom in 1918. His son, the second Baron, succeeded him. He was a businessman and Conservative politician. The titles became extinct in 1988 on the early death of his grandson, the fourth Baron.

== Barons Blackford (1935) ==
- William James Peake Mason, 1st Baron Blackford (1862–1947)
- Glyn Keith Murray Mason, 2nd Baron Blackford (1887–1972)
- Keith Alexander Henry Mason, 3rd Baron Blackford (1923–1977)
- William Keith Mason, 4th Baron Blackford (1962–1988)

== Arms ==
Coat of arms of Baron Blackford

Crest
A stag's head erased Azure attired and charged on the neck with three cross crosslets in fess Or.
Escutcheon
Or three spur rowels Azure on a chief of the last a plate charged with a fleur-de-lis between two like plates each charged with a cross couped all Gules.
Supporters
On either side a stag Proper charged on the shoulder with a patriarchal cross Gules.
Motto
Eacta Non Verba (Deeds Not Words)
