= Gilbert Foan =

British hairdresser and politician

Gilbert Arthur Foan (1887 – 21 February 1935) was a British hairdresser and socialist politician. He wrote several influential books on hair and make-up.

Born in Yeovil to a Quaker family, Foan received an elementary education before becoming an agricultural labourer. By 1911, he was living in Saffron Walden, where he became the secretary of the local branch of the Independent Labour Party (ILP). He was also active in the National Agricultural Labourers' and Rural Workers' Union, and was a leading figure in its East Anglian strike, from 1912 until 1914. He married Edith in 1914, and the couple relocated to Croydon, where Foan opened a tobacconists' shop, where he also worked as a hairdresser. During World War I, he was a conscientious objector, and was sentenced to hard labour at Wormwood Scrubs. In April 1919, he was released due to his poor health.

Foan became the chair of the Croydon branch of the ILP, and also of the local Labour Party, to which the ILP was affiliated. He was the Labour Party candidate for Croydon North at the 1923, 1924 and 1929 general elections, taking a distant second place on each occasion. He served on the Croydon Board of Guardians from 1922 until 1930, and on Croydon Town Council from 1926. At the 1931 general election, he instead contested Chelsea, taking second place but only 17% of the vote.

In 1926/27, Foan served as the president of the Hairdressers' Trade Parliamentary Committee, later serving as its secretary, and also as registrar of the Hairdressers' Registration Council. He wrote frequent articles for the Hairdressing Times and Record, The Hairdresser, and The Hairdressers' Weekly, arguing in favour of hairdressers receiving training through colleges. In 1931, he published The Art and Craft of Hairdressing, while with H. Stanley Bedgrove he co-authored two books on cosmetics: Paint, Powder and Patches, and Hair-dyes and Hair-dyeing: Chemistry and Technique.

Foan also wrote on criminology, and gave frequent public speeches about socialism. He held membership of the No More War Movement, and of the South Suburban Co-operative Society. He died early in 1935, and was cremated at West Norwood Cemetery.
