= Timothy King =

Sir Timothy Roger Alan King (born 5 April 1949), styled The Hon. Mr Justice King, is a retired judge of the High Court of England and Wales assigned to the Queen's Bench Division.

== Career as counsel ==
King was educated at the Liverpool Institute and Lincoln College, Oxford, where he achieved the degrees of MA and BCL. He was called to the Bar in 1973 by Lincoln's Inn and practised on the Northern Circuit, taking silk in 1991.

=== Notable cases as counsel ===
- 2001: R v Liverpool City Council, ex parte Karl Barry (Court of Appeal) on the limitations of local authority to license "doormen".
- 2004: R ex app. PD v West Midlands and North West Mental Health Review Tribunal (Court of Appeal) - on apparent or perceived bias of members of mental health tribunals.
- 2006: King defended BNP leaders Nick Griffin and Mark Collett at Leeds Crown Court on charges of inciting racial hatred. Their defence was based upon political freedom of speech. The defendants were acquitted of some charges at the initial trial, with the jury in that trial failing to reach a verdict on the remaining counts, at a re-trial they were acquitted of the remaining counts.
- 2006: Jones v Whalley (House of Lords): King argued about the effects of a police caution on subsequent proceedings.

== Career as judge ==
King was appointed to the High Court bench on 29 January 2007, and awarded a knighthood on 28 June the same year.

In March 2013 he was formally reprimanded by the Lord Chief Justice, Lord Judge, and Lord Chancellor, Chris Grayling MP, following a complaint. The Office for Judicial Complaints (OJC) gave little details about the complaint it received about Queen's Bench Division judge Mr Justice King other than to say that it regarded a late handing down of a judgment. On 3 August 2016 the Judicial Conducts Investigation Office issued the following statement "The Right Honourable Mr Justice Timothy King has been subject to an investigation into his conduct in respect of a delay in producing a judgment. The Lord Chancellor and Lord Chief Justice found that the delay was unacceptable and concluded that Mr Justice King’s behaviour in respect of this matter fell below the standards expected of a member of the Judiciary. Mr Justice King has been issued with a reprimand".
