= Marilyn Gillies Carr =

Scottish woman born without arms or hands

Marilyn Gillies Carr (born 16 December 1941) is a Scottish woman from Dundee. She was born without arms or hands and uses her feet for all activities of daily living.

She appeared with Douglas Bader in the documentary film Two of a Kind in 1971, which contrasted his life as a double-leg amputee with hers as a person with no arms. The programme showed many scenes of Marilyn going about her daily life; at home, at work and also driving her car with her feet. She also appeared on Grampian Television on the programme The Wednesday People in 1972.

She married Barry Carr, an R.A.F. pilot in 1973. Marilyn has been an enthusiastic supporter of the Douglas Bader Community Garden charity, based in Cupar, Fife. Marilyn was chair of the charity for a period, but resigned for personal reasons.

She ran in the Croydon North West by-election in 1981 as an Independent Pro-Life candidate. She won 340 votes, 1% of the total votes. Malcolm Muggeridge was a friend during this time.
