= Croydon North (constituency) =

UK Parliament constituency (1918–1955; 1997–2024)

- Former borough constituency for the House of Commons
- Boundary of Croydon North in Greater London for the 2019 general election
- County: Greater London
- Electorate: 85,107 (December 2010)
- Major settlements: Thornton Heath, Norbury, Selhurst, South Norwood, Upper Norwood

1997–2024
- Seats: One
- Created from: Croydon North East and Croydon North West
- Replaced by: Streatham and Croydon North and Croydon West

1918–1955
- Seats: One
- Created from: Croydon
- Replaced by: Croydon North East and Croydon North West

Croydon North was a constituency represented in the House of Commons of the UK Parliament from 2012 until its abolition for the 2024 general election by Steve Reed of Labour Co-op. The seat was created in 1918, split in two in 1955 (taking in neighbouring areas), and re-devised in a wholly different form in 1997.

Under the 2023 Periodic Review of Westminster constituencies, the majority of the constituency was incorporated into the re-established seat of Croydon West, with northern parts, including the areas of Norbury, Thornton Heath and Upper Norwood, forming part of the newly created constituency of Streatham and Croydon North.

== History ==
The seat was created from the former Croydon North West and part of the former North East constituencies. In its previous form it existed from 1918 until 1955.

On re-creation at the 1997 general election the MP for the seat became Malcolm Wicks of the Labour Party with the fourth largest Labour majority in Greater London. Wicks was victorious at the next two general elections and died on 29 September 2012, prompting a by-election which was won by Steve Reed of the same party. The 2015 result made the seat the 31st safest of Labour's 232 seats by percentage of majority.

== Constituency profile ==
Croydon North is the most densely populated of Croydon's three seats, regarded as a safe Labour seat with all wards controlled by them at local level, consisting for the most part of rows of modest terraced houses, interspersed with tower blocks, much of it social and ex-social housing and with recreational areas.

Passing through the constituency are London Overground and Southern services to London Victoria and Croydon — the seat is well connected by several stations to rail services. There has been some regeneration since 2000 with new-build developments for affluent commuters.

The seat includes Crystal Palace FC's ground at Selhurst Park and the northeastern end of the seat is near the site of the former Crystal Palace itself.

== Boundaries ==
Map of boundaries 2010-2024

Dates	Local authority	Maps	Wards
1918-1950	County Borough of Croydon		North, South Norwood and Upper Norwood.
1950–1955	County Borough of Croydon		Bensham Manor, Norbury, Thornton Heath, Upper Norwood and West Thornton.
1997–2010	London Borough of Croydon		Bensham Manor, Beulah, Broad Green, Norbury, South Norwood, Thornton Heath, Upper Norwood, West Thornton and Whitehorse Manor.
2010–2024	London Borough of Croydon		Bensham Manor, Broad Green, Norbury, Selhurst, South Norwood, Thornton Heath, Upper Norwood and West Thornton.

== Members of Parliament ==
=== As Croydon North ===
==== MPs 1918–1955 ====
Election	Member	Party
1918	George Borwick	Conservative
1922	Glyn Mason	Conservative
1940 by-election	Henry Willink	Conservative
1948 by-election	Fred Harris	Conservative
1955	constituency abolished	

==== MPs since 1997 ====
Election	Member	Party
1997	Malcolm Wicks	Labour
2012 by-election	Steve Reed	Labour Co-op

== Election results ==
=== Elections in the 2010s ===
General election 2019: Croydon North
Party	Candidate	Votes	%	±%
Labour Co-op	Steve Reed	36,495	65.6	−8.6
Conservative	Donald Ekekhomen	11,822	21.3	+1.4
Liberal Democrats	Claire Bonham	4,476	8.0	+5.2
Green	Rachel Chance	1,629	2.9	+1.3
Brexit Party	Chidi Ngwaba	839	1.5	New
CPA	Candace Mitchell	348	0.6	New
Majority		24,673	44.4	−10.0
Turnout		55,609	62.9	−5.3
Registered electors		88,466		
Labour Co-op hold		Swing	-5.0	

General election 2017: Croydon North
Party	Candidate	Votes	%	±%
Labour Co-op	Steve Reed	44,213	74.2	+11.6
Conservative	Samuel Kasumu	11,848	19.9	−2.8
Liberal Democrats	Maltby Pindar	1,656	2.8	−0.8
Green	Peter Underwood	983	1.6	−3.1
UKIP	Michael Swadling	753	1.3	−4.1
Independent	Lee Berks	170	0.3	0.0
Majority		32,365	54.3	+14.4
Turnout		59,623	68.2	+5.9
Registered electors		87,461		
Labour Co-op hold		Swing	+7.2	

General election 2015: Croydon North
Party	Candidate	Votes	%	±%
Labour Co-op	Steve Reed	33,513	62.6	+6.6
Conservative	Vidhi Mohan	12,149	22.7	−1.4
UKIP	Winston McKenzie	2,899	5.4	+3.7
Green	Shasha Khan	2,515	4.7	+2.7
Liberal Democrats	Joanna Corbin	1,919	3.6	−10.4
TUSC	Glen Hart	261	0.5	New
Independent	Lee Berks	141	0.3	New
Communist	Ben Stevenson	125	0.2	−0.1
Majority		21,364	39.9	−8.0
Turnout		53,522	62.3	+1.7
Registered electors		85,941		
Labour Co-op hold		Swing	+4.0	

2012 Croydon North by-election
Party	Candidate	Votes	%	±%
Labour Co-op	Steve Reed	15,892	64.7	+8.7
Conservative	Andrew Stranack	4,137	16.8	−7.3
UKIP	Winston McKenzie	1,400	5.7	+4.0
Liberal Democrats	Marisha Ray	860	3.5	−10.5
Green	Shasha Khan	855	3.5	+1.5
Respect	Lee Jasper	707	2.9	+2.4
CPA	Stephen Hammond	192	0.8	New
National Front	Richard Edmonds	161	0.7	New
Communist	Ben Stevenson	119	0.5	+0.2
Monster Raving Loony	John Cartwright	110	0.4	New
Nine Eleven Was An Inside Job	Simon Lane	66	0.3	New
Young People's	Robin Smith	63	0.3	New
Majority		11,755	47.9	+16.0
Turnout		24,562	26.5	−34.1
Rejected ballots		112	0.1	
Registered electors		93,036		
Labour Co-op hold		Swing	+8.0	

General election 2010: Croydon North
Party	Candidate	Votes	%	±%
Labour	Malcolm Wicks	28,947	56.0	+2.4
Conservative	Jason Hadden	12,466	24.1	+1.9
Liberal Democrats	Gerry Jerome	7,226	14.0	−3.2
Green	Shasha Khan	1,017	2.0	−0.9
UKIP	Jonathan Serter	891	1.7	0.0
Christian	Novlette Williams	586	1.1	New
Respect	Mohommad Shaikh	272	0.5	New
Communist	Ben Stevenson	160	0.3	New
Independent	Mohamed Seyed	111	0.2	New
Majority		16,481	31.9	+0.5
Turnout		51,676	60.6	+8.0
Registered electors		85,216		
Labour hold		Swing	+0.3	

=== Elections in the 2000s ===
General election 2005: Croydon North
Party	Candidate	Votes	%	±%
Labour	Malcolm Wicks	23,555	53.7	−9.8
Conservative	Tariq Ahmad	9,667	22.0	−1.3
Liberal Democrats	Adrian Gee-Turner	7,590	17.2	+6.8
Green	Shasha Khan	1,248	2.8	New
UKIP	Henry Pearce	770	1.8	+0.4
Croydon Pensions Alliance	Peter Gibson	394	0.9	New
Veritas	Winston McKenzie	324	0.7	New
Independent	Farhan Rasheed	197	0.4	New
The People's Choice! Exclusively For All	Michelle Chambers	132	0.3	New
Majority		13,888	31.7	−8.5
Turnout		43,877	52.3	−0.9
Registered electors		83,629		
Labour hold		Swing	-4.3	

General election 2001: Croydon North
Party	Candidate	Votes	%	±%
Labour	Malcolm Wicks	26,610	63.5	+1.3
Conservative	Simon Allison	9,752	23.3	−3.9
Liberal Democrats	Sandra Lawman	4,375	10.4	+2.7
UKIP	Alan Smith	606	1.4	+0.6
Socialist Alliance	Don Madgwick	539	1.3	New
Majority		16,858	40.2	+5.2
Turnout		41,882	53.2	−15.0
Registered electors		78,675		
Labour hold		Swing	-2.6	

=== Elections in the 1990s ===
General election 1997: Croydon North
Party	Candidate	Votes	%	±%
Labour	Malcolm Wicks	32,672	62.2	
Conservative	Ian Martin	14,274	27.2	
Liberal Democrats	Martin Morris	4,066	7.7	
Referendum	Roger Billis	1,155	2.2	
UKIP	James R. Feisenberger	396	0.8	
Majority		18,398	35.0	
Turnout		52,563	68.2	
Registered electors		77,063		
Labour win (new seat)				

=== Elections in the 1950s ===
General election 1951: Croydon North
Party	Candidate	Votes	%	±%
Conservative	Fred Harris	29,984	55.5	+2.1
Labour	Reg Prentice	19,738	36.6	+0.1
Liberal	Brian Dudley Collins	4,272	7.9	−2.3
Majority		10,246	18.9	+2.0
Turnout		53,994	83.7	−3.1
Registered electors		64,522		
Conservative hold		Swing	+1.0	

General election 1950: Croydon North
Party	Candidate	Votes	%	±%
Conservative	Fred Harris	29,420	53.4	+12.3
Labour	Reg Prentice	20,116	36.5	−3.6
Liberal	Frederick Owen Halsall Rowlands	5,600	10.2	+0.8
Majority		9,304	16.9	−0.5
Turnout		55,136	86.8	+13.4
Registered electors		63,537		
Conservative hold		Swing		

=== Elections in the 1940s ===
1948 Croydon North by-election
Party	Candidate	Votes	%	±%
Conservative	Fred Harris	36,200	54.0	+13.9
Labour	Harold Nicolson	24,536	36.6	−3.5
Liberal	Don Bennett	6,321	9.4	−9.4
Majority		11,664	17.4	+16.4
Turnout		67,057	74.8	+1.4
Registered electors				
Conservative hold		Swing	+8.7	

General election 1945: Croydon North
Party	Candidate	Votes	%	±%
Conservative	Henry Willink	23,417	41.1	−26.0
Labour	Marion Billson	22,810	40.1	+7.2
Liberal	John Howard	10,714	18.8	New
Majority		607	1.0	−33.2
Turnout		56,941	73.4	+8.8
Registered electors		77,594		
Conservative hold		Swing	-16.6	

1940 Croydon North by-election
Party	Candidate	Votes	%	±%
Conservative	Henry Willink	14,163	90.7	+23.6
Independent	Arthur Lascelles Lucas	1,445	9.3	New
Majority		12,718	81.4	+47.2
Turnout		15,608	18.3	−46.3
Registered electors				
Conservative hold		Swing		

=== Elections in the 1930s ===
General election 1935: Croydon North
Party	Candidate	Votes	%	±%
Conservative	Glyn Mason	36,383	67.1	−13.8
Labour	Frank Mitchell	17,872	32.9	+13.8
Majority		18,511	34.2	−27.6
Turnout		54,255	64.6	−4.8
Registered electors		83,986		
Conservative hold		Swing	-13.8	

General election 1931: Croydon North
Party	Candidate	Votes	%	±%
Conservative	Glyn Mason	45,595	80.9	+30.5
Labour	H.W. Ray	10,795	19.1	−7.4
Majority		34,800	61.8	+37.9
Turnout		56,490	69.4	−0.4
Registered electors		81,305		
Conservative hold		Swing	+19.0	

=== Elections in the 1920s ===
General election 1929: Croydon North
Party	Candidate	Votes	%	±%
Unionist	Glyn Mason	26,336	50.4	−19.9
Labour	Gilbert Foan	13,852	26.5	−3.2
Liberal	Cyril Walter Nunneley	12,053	23.1	New
Majority		12,484	23.9	−16.7
Turnout		52,241	69.8	−3.0
Registered electors		74,835		
Unionist hold		Swing	-8.4	

General election 1924: Croydon North
Party	Candidate	Votes	%	±%
Unionist	Glyn Mason	25,972	70.3	+7.3
Labour	Gilbert Foan	10,954	29.7	−7.3
Majority		15,018	40.6	+14.6
Turnout		36,926	72.8	+17.1
Registered electors		50,697		
Unionist hold		Swing	+7.3	

General election 1923: Croydon North
Party	Candidate	Votes	%	±%
Unionist	Glyn Mason	17,085	63.0	N/A
Labour	Gilbert Foan	10,054	37.0	New
Majority		7,031	26.0	N/A
Turnout		27,139	55.7	N/A
Registered electors		48,760		
Unionist hold		Swing	N/A	

General election 1922: Croydon North
Party	Candidate	Votes	%	±%
Unionist	Glyn Mason	Unopposed		
Registered electors		47,675		
Unionist hold				

=== Elections in the 1910s ===
General election 1918: Croydon North
Party		Candidate	Votes	%	±%
C	Unionist	George Borwick	16,520	70.0	
	Liberal	James Trumble	7,094	30.0	
Majority			9,426	40.0	
Turnout			23,614	54.1	
Registered electors			43,669		
	Unionist win (new seat)				
C indicates candidate endorsed by the coalition government.

== See also ==
- List of parliamentary constituencies in London

== Sources ==
- Leigh Rayment's Historical List of MPs – Constituencies beginning with "C" (part 6)
