= National Front (UK) election results =

Election results of National Front (UK)

See National Front for details of the far-right party.

The National Front's election results in parliamentary elections are shown below.

== United Kingdom elections ==
=== Summary of general election performance ===
Year	Number of candidates	Total votes	Average votes per candidate	% of vote	Saved deposits	Change (% points)	Number of MPs	Rank
1970	10	11,449	1,145	0.04	0	N/A	0	14/25 ▲
Feb 1974	54	76,865	1,423	0.2	0	+0.16	0	9/39 ▲
Oct 1974	90	113,843	1,265	0.4	0	+0.2	0	8/33 ▲
1979	303	191,719	633	0.6	0	+0.2	0	6/42 ▲
1983	60	27,065	451	0.1	0	−0.5	0	13/29 ▼
1987	1	286	286	0.0	0	−0.1	0	▼
1992	14	4,816	344	0.1	0	0.0	0	20/27 ▼
1997	6	2,716	452	0.0	0	−0.1	0	28/35 ▼
2001	5	2,484	497	0.0	0	0.0	0	26/34 ▲
2005	13	8,029	617	0.0	0	0.0	0	21/42 ▲
2010	17	10,784	634	0.0	0	0.0	0	19/38 ▲
2015	7	1,114	159	0.0	0	0.0	0	32/50 ▼

=== By-elections, 1967–70 ===
Date of election	Constituency	Candidate	Votes	%
28 March 1968	Acton	Andrew Fountaine	1400	5.6

=== General election, 18 June 1970 ===
Constituency	Candidate	Votes	%
Battersea South	T Lamb	716	3.3
Cardiff South East	G Parsons	982	1.9
Deptford	M Vaux	1,277	5.5
Enfield West	K Taylor	1,175	3.1
Huddersfield West	R Scott	1,427	3.5
Ilford South	M Skeggs	190	0.5
Islington North	Revd. B Green	1,232	5.6
Leicester South West	J Kyneston	749	2.3
Southall	J Shaw	1,572	4.4
Wolverhampton North East	S Wright	1,582	4.7

=== By-elections, 1970–74 ===
Date of election	Constituency	Candidate	Votes	%
22 October 1970	St Marylebone	Malcolm Skeggs	401	2.4
19 November 1970	Enfield West	Kenneth Taylor	1,176	4.4
7 December 1972	Uxbridge	John Clifton	2,920	8.2
24 May 1973	West Bromwich	Martin Webster	4,789	16.0
8 November 1973	Hove	Sqn Ldr John Harrison-Broadley	1,409	3.1

=== General elections, 28 February and 10 October 1974 ===
Constituency	Candidate in Feb	Votes	%	Candidate in Oct	Votes	%
Accrington				D Riley	1176	2.9
Aldershot	A Greenslade	1148	1.8	A Greenslade	1120	1.9
Barking				C Bond	1661	4.9
Basingstoke				G Goodall	763	1.1
Battersea North				R Friend	1260	4.5
Battersea South	J Clifton	787	2.3			
Bermondsey	G Davey	1485	4.1	G Davey	1488	4.8
Bethnal Green and Bow				W Castleton	2172	7.6
Birmingham Erdington	T Finnegan	1145	2.4	T Finnegan	1413	3.3
Birmingham Handsworth				J Finnegan	830	2.8
Birmingham Ladywood	J Davis	751	2.9			
Birmingham Perry Barr	A Shorthouse	853	2.1	R Warren	826	2.1
Birmingham Yardley				H Challender	1034	2.4
Blackburn	John Kingsley Read	1778	4.2	John Kingsley Read	1758	4.4
Bolton East	G Booth	1259	2.6	G Booth	1106	2.4
Bolton West				W Roberts	1070	2.7
Bournemouth East	M Hayes	875	2.0	M Hayes	828	2.6
Brent East				N Lyons	1096	2.9
Brent North	A Smith	1570	2.7	Mrs J Cattanach	1297	2.5
Brent South	Sqn Ldr J Harrison-Broadley	1852	4.3	Sqn Ldr John Harrison-Broadley	1388	3.7
Brentford and Isleworth	T Benford	1741	3.1	T Benford	1362	2.6
Bridlington				F Day	987	1.9
Bristol South	P Garnaway	1006	2.2	P Garnaway	798	1.9
Bristol South East	R Bale	757	1.3	R Bale	775	1.5
Canterbury	K McKilliam	831	1.2	K McKilliam	1096	1.8
Chipping Barnet				R Cole	1207	2.9
City of London & Westminster South				D Baxter	686	2.5
Coventry North West				P Holland	1049	2.7
Coventry South West				R Rickard	822	1.5
Dartford	R Aldous	945	2.0	R Aldous	939	2.2
Deptford				Richard Edmonds	1731	4.5
Dudley East				C Knott	1171	2.8
Edmonton	J Bruce	1765	3.8	J Bruce	1895	4.6
Enfield North	K Robinson	1372	2.6	R Burton	1330	2.8
Eton and Slough	A Coniam	1541	3.0	A Coniam	1241	2.7
Fareham				R Doughty	617	1.4
Feltham and Heston	Mrs J Reid	1653	4.4	Mrs J Reid	1984	3.7
Finchley				Mrs J Godfrey	993	2.6
Fulham	A Smithies	966	2.1	J Cordrey	855	2.1
Gillingham				S Campbell	922	2.0
Glasgow Govan				M Brooks	86	0.3
Gravesend	J Turner	1726	2.4	J Turner	1304	1.9
Hackney North and Stoke Newington	H Lord	1226	3.7	H Lord	1044	3.7
Hackney South and Shoreditch				R May	2544	9.4
Harrogate	Andrew Brons	1186	2.3	Andrew Brons	1030	2.3
Harrow Central	J Donin	823	2.3	C Byrne	813	2.5
Hayes and Harlington	J Fairhurst	2721	6.5	J Fairhurst	1189	3.1
Hertford and Stevenage				K Taylor	1234	2.0
Hornsey				Mrs J Stubbs	973	2.7
Horsham and Crawley				A Brewer	1101	1.6
Hove	Ted Budden	442	0.8			
Huddersfield East	N Mear	796	1.9	J Robertshaw	764	1.9
Huddersfield West				D Ford	760	1.9
Islington Central				R Score	1335	5.3
Islington North	J Score	871	3.3			
Keighley				G Wright	959	2.0
Leicester East	K Sanders	3662	7.4	Anthony Reed Herbert	2967	6.0
Leicester South	J Kynaston	1639	3.0	A Cartwright	2072	3.5
Leicester West	W Newcombe	2579	5.3	W Newcombe	2253	5.1
Lewisham West	P Williams	1000	2.0	P Williams	1114	2.5
Leyton	Mrs S Bothwell	2097	4.5	Mrs S Bothwell	2168	4.3
Liverpool Walton				C Gibbon	647	1.7
Loughborough				K Sanders	1215	2.2
Manchester Blackley				H Andrew	914	2.4
Manchester Openshaw				J Hulse	541	1.7
Newham North East				J Newham	2715	7.0
Newham South*	M Lobb	2511	6.9	E Bayley	2412	7.8
Norwich North				Mrs G Goold	544	1.5
Nottingham North				D Caine	972	1.5
Oxford				Ian Anderson	572	1.0
Preston South				E Harrison	663	1.7
Ravensbourne	C Parker	786	2.0	I Stevens	574	1.6
Reading North				I Baker	594	1.3
Richmond upon Thames	E Russell	570	1.3	E Russell	1000	2.5
Rochdale	M Sellors	1885	3.7	M Sellors	1927	4.1
Rochester and Chatham				G Hazleden	1150	2.0
Sheffield Heeley				P Revell	723	1.5
Southgate	B Pell	1192	2.2	B Pell	1225	2.6
South Shields	W Owen	1958	3.8	W Owen	711	1.5
Spelthorne	E Butterfield	1399	2.4	J Clifton	1108	2.3
Streatham	T Lamb	937	2.3	T Lamb	817	2.3
Thanet East				K Munson	708	2.1
Tottenham	Roy Painter	1270	4.1	Roy Painter	2211	8.3
Wallasey				J Fishwick	787	1.5
Walsall South				C Parker	1226	2.8
Walthamstow				R Adde	1911	5.5
Watford	J Wotherspoon	651	1.4	J Wotherspoon	671	1.5
West Bromwich East	Martin Webster	2907	7.0	G Bowen	1692	4.3
West Bromwich West	G Bowen	3107	7.8	R Churms	2022	5.5
Woking				R Vaughan-Smith	921	1.9
Wolverhampton North East	A Webber	2548	5.2	A Webber	1928	4.2
Wolverhampton South East	J Parker	1546	3.9	G Oland	1703	4.7
Wolverhampton South West	G Cooper	1523	3.0	G Cooper	1573	3.3
Wood Green				K Squire	2603	8.0
Woolwich East	P Hanman	1066	2.8	M Skeggs	1000	3.0
Wycombe				D Howard-Smith	2049	3.5

- Newham S 1974 by election, see below

=== By-elections, 1974–79 ===
Date of election	Constituency	Candidate	Votes	%
23 May 1974	Newham South	Michael Lobb	1713	11.5
26 June 1975	Woolwich West	Mrs. Ruth Robinson	856	2.4
4 March 1976	Coventry North West	Andrew Fountaine	986	3.1
11 March 1976	Carshalton	Terry Denville-Faulkner	1851	4.6
24 June 1976	Rotherham	George Wright	1699	6.0
15 July 1976	Thurrock	John Roberts	3255	6.6
4 November 1976	Newcastle upon Tyne Central	Bruce Anderson-Lynes	181	1.1
4 November 1976	Walsall North	Joseph Parker	2724	7.3
2 December 1976	Cambridge	Jeremy Wotherspoon	700	2.2
24 February 1977	City of London & Westminster South	Paul Kavanagh	1051	5.2
31 May1977	Birmingham Stechford	Andrew Brons	2995	8.2
28 April 1977	Ashfield	George Herrod	1734	3.8
18 August 1977	Birmingham Ladywood	Anthony Reed Herbert	888	5.7
24 November 1977	Bournemouth East	Kenneth McKilliam	725	3.0
2 March 1978	Ilford North	John Hughes	2126	4.7
20 April 1978	Lambeth Central	Mrs. Helena Steven	1291	6.2
27 April 1978	Epsom and Ewell	James Sawyer	823	1.9
27 April 1978	Wycombe	Mrs Sylvia Jones	2040	4.1
13 July 1978	Manchester Moss Side	Herbert Andrew	623	2.3

=== General election, 3 May 1979 ===
Constituency	Candidate	Votes	%
Accrington	D Riley	508	1.3
Acton	C Wakley	501	1.2
Ashfield	W Annable	397	0.6
Ashford	K McKilliam	678	1.4
Ashton-under-Lyne	D Jones	486	1.1
Banbury	I Cherry	504	0.9
Barking	I Newport	1,021	3.0
Barry	E Kerton	312	0.5
Basildon	G Sawyer	880	1.1
Basingstoke	B Packer	677	0.9
Bath	T Mundy	206	0.4
Battersea North	M Salt	772	2.7
Battersea South	A Perry	561	1.8
Beaconsfield	J Noyes	548	1.1
Beckenham	N Dickson	606	1.4
Bedford	R Stearns	813	1.3
Bedfordshire South	L Smith	626	1.1
Belper	J Grand-Scrutton	460	0.8
Bermondsey	J Sneath	1175	3.9
Bethnal Green and Bow	Martin Webster	1740	6.1
Bexleyheath	A Wilkens	749	1.8
Birmingham Erdington	F Hastilow	687	1.6
Birmingham Hall Green	R Maylin	615	1.2
Birmingham Northfield	R Newman	614	1.1
Birmingham Perry Barr	K Axon	582	1.5
Birmingham Selly Oak	G Bassett	401	0.8
Birmingham Small Heath	M Caffery	490	1.7
Birmingham Stechford	F Russell	698	1.6
Birmingham Yardley	H Challendar	749	1.8
Blaby	P Gegan	2056	3.6
Blackburn	E Adamson	565	1.5
Blackpool North	A Hanson	943	2.2
Blackpool South	A Machin	524	1.2
Bodmin	M Carter	235	0.5
Bolton East	J Hamilton	457	1.0
Bolton West	K Bernal	348	0.9
Bosworth	D Dunn	682	0.9
Bournemouth West	G Hubbard	438	1.0
Bradford North	Andrew Brons	614	1.3
Bradford South	G Wright	422	0.8
Bradford West	G Brown	633	1.4
Brent East	J Davies	706	1.9
Brent North	G John	873	1.6
Brent South	A Downes	811	2.0
Brentford and Isleworth	P Attridge	738	1.3
Brighton Kemptown	V Tyndall	404	0.9
Brighton Pavilion	H Jones	436	1.1
Bristol North East	K Brown	320	0.8
Bristol North West	P Kingston	254	0.5
Bristol South	K Elliot	392	0.9
Bristol South East	K Dowler	523	1.0
Bristol West	M Jones	246	0.6
Bromsgrove and Redditch	B Deakin	752	0.9
Buckingham	M Smith	803	1.0
Bury and Radcliffe	J Bridge	414	0.6
Cambridge	Derek Holland	311	0.6
Canterbury	Mrs J White	941	1.4
Cardiff West	C Gibbon	1287	4.1
Carlton	M Watts	606	1.0
Carmarthen	C Grice	149	0.3
Carshalton	T Denville-Faulkner	919	1.8
Chelsea	A Reeve	342	1.0
Cheltenham	R Jacklin	342	0.7
Chertsey and Walton	M Gillibrand	819	1.6
Chesham and Amersham	S Clinch	697	1.3
Chingford	D South	1157	2.6
Chipping Barnet	R Cole	865	2.0
Chislehurst	R Hoy	564	1.3
Chorley	M Dean	379	0.6
Cities of London and Westminster	S K Matthews	478	1.7
Cornwall North	R Bridgwater	224	0.5
Coventry North East	H Robbins	546	1.2
Coventry North West	A Stewart	359	0.9
Coventry South East	R Clarke	513	1.4
Coventry South West	M Williamson	482	0.9
Crewe	W Tonks	352	0.8
Croydon North East	P Moss	464	1.1
Croydon South	R Dummer	469	1.0
Dagenham	J Roberts	1553	3.3
Darlington	H Outhwaite	444	0.9
Dartford	I Nobbs	476	1.0
Daventry	G Younger	522	0.7
Deptford	R Mitchell	1490	4.2
Derby North	C Bayliss	592	0.9
Derby South	L Verity	587	1.1
Derbyshire South East	C Neil	498	1.1
Devon North	J Price	237	0.4
Devon West	R Bearsford-Walker	393	0.8
Doncaster	M Day	300	0.7
Dorset West	J Tillotson	514	1.2
Dover and Deal	P Johnson	378	0.6
Dudley East	A Baker	844	2.0
Dulwich	D Thompson	920	2.1
Ealing North	J Shaw	1047	1.8
Eastbourne	C Mitchell	533	0.9
Edmonton	D Bruce	1213	2.8
Enfield North	J Wotherspoon	816	1.6
Epping Forest	B Wilkins	1110	2.2
Erith and Crayford	O Hawke	838	1.8
Eton and Slough	D Jones	943	1.9
Falmouth and Camborne	M Swingler	280	0.5
Fareham	D Vine	252	0.5
Faversham	A Webb	439	0.7
Feltham and Heston	J Reid	898	1.5
Finchley	W Verity	534	1.3
Folkestone and Hythe	M Lavine	478	1.0
Fulham	D Roberts	499	0.8
Fylde North	K Warburton	481	0.8
Fylde South	M Roberts	941	1.3
Gateshead West	H Beadle	186	0.9
Gillingham	S Campbell	528	1.1
Glasgow Pollok	I Skinner	104	0.2
Gloucester	R Morgan	527	1.0
Gloucestershire West	G Storkey	270	0.5
Gravesend	G Willden	603	0.8
Great Yarmouth	Tom Holmes	640	1.2
Greenwich	H Steven	951	2.6
Grimsby	J Hayes	137	0.3
Hackney Central	R May	1418	5.1
Hackney North and Stoke Newington	S May	860	3.0
Hackney South and Shoreditch	John Tyndall	1958	7.6
Halesowen and Stourbridge	S Goodwin	921	1.4
Halifax	B Wadsworth	455	0.9
Hammersmith North	R Pearse	462	1.3
Hampstead	J White	255	0.6
Harborough	A Ashby	1002	1.8
Harlow	J Childs	840	1.6
Harrogate	D Waite	585	1.4
Harrow Central	H Marshall	427	1.3
Harrow East	L le Croisette	572	1.5
Harrow West	T Bennett	646	1.4
Harwich	A Pearson	597	0.9
Hastings	H Anderson	344	0.8
Hayes and Harlington	G Callow	582	1.4
Hemel Hempstead	T Walters	649	0.8
Hendon North	B Franklyn	638	1.0
Hendon South	A Elder	290	0.8
Hertford and Stevenage	J Pell	581	0.8
Hertfordshire East	J Smith	1819	2.4
Hertfordshire South	S Fenn	605	1.2
Hertfordshire South West	P Graves	839	1.4
Heywood and Royton	R Marsh	641	1.0
Hitchin	V Logan	881	1.4
Holborn and St Pancras South	F Theobald	334	1.4
Horncastle	M Hook	319	0.8
Hornchurch	A Harris	994	2.1
Hornsey	P Pell	337	0.8
Horsham and Crawley	A Murch	493	0.6
Hove	F Sheridan	508	1.0
Huntingdonshire	K Robinson	983	1.4
Ilford North	J Hughes	804	1.6
Ilford South	T Fitzgerald	636	1.5
Ipswich	P Robinson	449	0.6
Islington Central	S Chaney	797	1.2
Islington North	S Hook	501	2.1
Islington South and Finsbury	P Kavanagh	824	3.4
Keighley	R Fairey	234	0.5
Kensington	C Hopewell	356	1.1
Kidderminster	A Luckman	1052	1.7
Kingston upon Hull Central	A Braithwaite	422	1.0
Kingston upon Hull East	D Matson	374	0.6
Kingston upon Hull West	M Fox	411	1.2
Kingswood	R Bale	258	0.5
Lambeth Central	V Lillington	830	3.0
Lancaster	D White	196	0.5
Leeds East	S Rigby	445	0.9
Leeds South	B Spink	416	1.2
Leeds South East	P Flint	168	0.6
Leeds West	J Duckenfield	466	1.1
Leicester East	B Calver	1385	2.7
Leicester South	A Cartwright	940	1.8
Leicester West	P Ash	1308	2.7
Lewes	B Webb	764	1.3
Lewisham East	M Ellis	1168	2.3
Lewisham West	P Williams	901	2.0
Leyton	P Pomery-Rudd	1179	2.9
Lichfield and Tamworth	P Wallace	475	0.6
Lincoln	J Noble	107	0.3
Liverpool Edge Hill	H Hawksley	152	0.6
Liverpool Kirkdale	W Williams	198	0.7
Liverpool Walton	W Haire	254	0.7
Loughborough	John Peacock	484	0.8
Louth	C Stokes	261	0.5
Ludlow	R Adshead	354	0.9
Luton East	M Kerry	461	1.1
Luton West	D How	701	1.5
Maidstone	D Whiting	703	1.0
Manchester Blackley	N Wallace	326	0.8
Manchester Central	P Benthall	365	1.8
Manchester Gorton	R Chadfield	469	1.1
Manchester Openshaw	A Coles	296	1.1
Mansfield	P Donovan	259	0.5
Meriden	A Parkes	1032	1.4
Middleton and Prestwich	S Andrews	350	0.6
Mitcham and Morden	J Perryman	966	2.0
Nantwich	J Green	814	1.6
Newham North East	W Northcott	1769	4.2
Newham North West	M Maloney	1217	4.1
Newham South	T Anderson	1899	6.2
Newport	G Woodward	454	0.8
Newton	A Fishwick	641	0.8
Norfolk North	A Sizeland	548	0.7
Northampton North	R Rickord	373	1.0
Northampton South	M James	407	1.1
Norwich North	L Goold	250	0.7
Norwich South	Andrew Fountaine	264	0.7
Norwood	C Williams	707	2.1
Nottingham East	M Coles	426	1.4
Nottingham North	R Pratt	454	0.9
Nottingham West	T Wilkinson	718	1.3
Nuneaton	R Matthews	1028	1.6
Oldham West	G Halliwell	515	1.5
Orpington	F Hitches	516	0.9
Paddington	J Cameron	402	1.1
Peckham	M Roberts	1503	4.4
Peterborough	J Wilhelmy	672	1.2
Plymouth Devonport	L Bearsford-Walker	243	0.7
Plymouth Drake	C Bradbury	279	0.7
Pontypridd	R Davies	263	1.5
Portsmouth North	R Hadlow	298	0.6
Portsmouth South	W Donkin	457	0.9
Preston North	J Hetherington	329	0.8
Preston South	M Gibson	258	0.7
Putney	J Webster	685	1.4
Ravensbourne	S Greene	478	1.3
Reading North	P Baker	554	1.1
Richmond upon Thames	P Murphy	244	0.6
Rochdale	J Merrick	690	1.4
Rochester and Chatham	J King	417	0.7
Romford	M Caine	820	1.9
Rotherham	K Davies	490	1.1
Rugby	A Gresham	551	1.1
Ruislip Northwood	A Martin	477	1.1
Rye	T Duesbury	552	1.0
Saffron Walden	R Bailey	342	0.6
St Marylebone	C Elrick	239	1.0
St Pancras North	S Andrews	360	1.3
Sevenoaks	M Easter	821	1.3
Sheffield Attercliffe	J Mason	457	1.0
Sheffield Brightside	K Brack	354	0.9
Sheffield Hallam	G Smith	300	0.5
Sheffield Heeley	P Thorpe	274	0.6
Sheffield Hillsborough	S Williams	326	0.9
Sheffield Park	I Pierson	302	0.7
Shoreham	J Benjafield	406	0.7
Sidcup	A Webb	774	2.0
Solihull	D Stevenson	978	1.5
Southall	J Fairhurst	1545	3.0
Southend East	P Twomey	676	1.7
Southend West	L McKeon	680	1.3
Southgate	R Pert	895	1.7
Spelthorne	J Sawyer	518	1.0
Staffordshire South West	J Thomas	912	1.7
Stepney and Poplar	V Clarke	1571	5.0
Stockport North	K Walker	244	0.6
Stockport South	R Murphy	374	1.0
Stockton	A Bruce	384	0.6
Stoke-on-Trent North	C Baugh	341	0.8
Streatham	G Bryant	523	1.4
Surrey East	D Smith	452	1.0
Surrey North West	R Heath	796	1.4
Sutton and Cheam	J Hunt	465	0.9
Sutton Coldfield	R Wallace	466	0.9
Thanet East	B Dobing	376	1.1
Thornaby	M Evans	251	0.5
Thurrock	E Burdett	1358	2.0
Tonbridge and Malling	G Burnett	429	0.8
Tooting	P Berbridge	682	0.7
Torbay	J Spry	647	1.0
Tottenham	C Mates	833	2.9
Truro	N Hedger	182	0.3
Tunbridge Wells	W Standen	509	1.0
Twickenham	M Braithwaite	686	1.2
Upminster	W Neary	965	1.8
Uxbridge	P Budgen	595	1.3
Vauxhall	V Atkinson	879	3.5
Wakefield	A Cooper	530	1.0
Wallasey	J Fishwick	491	0.9
Wallsend	I Hunter	472	0.7
Walsall North	Charles Parker	1098	2.1
Walsall South	V Parker	795	1.8
Walthamstow	G Flaxton	1119	3.2
Wanstead and Woodford	C Bond	957	2.3
Warley East	J Worrall	1204	3.1
Watford	B Cheetham	388	0.9
Wellingborough	S Wright	529	0.7
Welwyn and Hatfield	P Ruddock	459	0.8
West Bromwich East	C Allsopp	1175	2.9
West Bromwich West	R Churms	1351	3.4
Wimbledon	A Bailey	612	1.2
Windsor and Maidenhead	P Crowley	930	1.4
Woking	P Gleave	564	1.0
Wokingham	G Sanders	722	1.1
Wolverhampton North East	G Cooper	1283	2.7
Wolverhampton South East	G Jones	1139	3.1
Wolverhampton South West	J Lees	912	1.8
Wood Green	R Frost	998	2.9
Woolwich East	I Steven	884	2.4
Woolwich West	M Skeggs	630	1.4
Worcester	K Stevens	450	0.8
Worthing	A Hough	893	1.6
Wycombe	S Jones	833	1.3
York	P Spink	221	0.4

=== By-elections, 1980–83 ===
Date of election	Constituency	Candidate	Votes	%
26 June 1980	Glasgow Central	John MacKenzie	148	1.8
22 October 1981	Croydon North West	Nick Griffin	429	1.2
3 June 1982	Mitcham & Morden	Joseph Pearce	547	1.0
28 October 1982	Birmingham Northfield	Ian Anderson	411	0.9
28 October 1982	Peckham	Martin Webster	874	3.9
24 February 1983	Bermondsey	James Sneath	426	1.4

=== General election, 9 June 1983 ===
Constituency	Candidate	Votes	%
Barking	I Newport	646	1.9
Battersea	M Salt	539	1.2
Bethnal Green and Stepney	V Clark	800	2.6
Birmingham Hodge Hill	N Tomkinson	529	1.3
Birmingham Yardley	R Jones	415	1.0
Blaby	P Gegan	568	1.0
Blackburn	D Riley	864	1.5
Blackpool North	A Hanson	514	1.3
Blackpool South	W Smith	263	0.7
Bow and Poplar	Mrs S Bartlett	596	1.9
Brentford and Isleworth	P Andrews	427	0.8
Brighton Kemptown	Ted Budden	290	0.7
Bristol East	E Andrews	434	0.7
Chingford	B Cheetham	380	0.9
City of London & Westminster South	A Reeve	258	0.7
Croydon North West	Nick Griffin	336	0.9
Dagenham	Joe Pearce	645	1.6
Dartford	G Nye	282	0.5
Dulwich	R Barker	338	0.9
Ealing Southall	E Pendrous	555	1.1
Feltham and Heston	S Glass	696	1.3
Fulham	R Pearse	229	0.6
Gravesham	P Johnson	420	0.8
Hackney North and Stoke Newington	J Field	396	1.1
Hackney South and Shoreditch	R Ashton	593	1.5
Hammersmith	Mrs L Bennett	250	0.8
Harrogate	P Vessey	163	0.3
Hornchurch	Mrs A Joyce	402	0.9
Islington South and Finsbury	J Donegan	341	0.9
Leeds East	Andrew Brons	475	1.1
Liverpool Mossley Hill	M Erickson-Rohrer	212	0.5
Manchester Central	A Coles	729	1.7
Meriden	C Collins	460	0.9
Mitcham and Morden	J Perryman	539	1.2
Newham North East	F Adams	794	2.1
Newham North West	M Hipperson	525	1.9
Newham South	Ian Anderson	993	3.7
Norwich South	P Williams	145	0.3
Norwood	Mrs C Williams	343	0.9
Peckham	Mrs M Bailey	800	2.5
Plymouth Devonport	R Bearsford-Walker	72	0.2
Plymouth Sutton	G Knight	297	0.6
Putney	M Connolly	290	0.6
Rochdale	P Barker	436	1.0
Romford	Mrs M Caine	432	1.1
Sevenoaks	G Burnett	416	0.8
Sheffield Brightside	P Spink	286	0.7
Slough	G John	528	1.0
Southwark and Bermondsey	J Sneath	474	1.4
Stalybridge and Hyde	B Nylan	294	0.6
Streatham	K Handy	321	0.8
Tooting	P Berbridge	355	0.8
Tunbridge Wells	D Smith	236	0.4
Twickenham	T Denville-Faulkner	234	0.5
Upminster	G Nobes-Pride	566	1.2
Vauxhall	J Wright	508	1.3
Walthamstow	P Mitchell	443	1.3
Wanstead and Woodford	H Marshall	456	1.2
Windsor and Maidenhead	G Gillmore	511	0.9
Wolverhampton North East	C Baugh	585	1.3
Worthing	Martin Wingfield	292	0.5

=== By-elections, 1984–87 ===
Date of election	Constituency	Candidate	Votes	%
14 June 1984	Portsmouth South	G A Knight	226	0.6
26 February 1987	Greenwich	Joe Pearce	103	0.3

=== General election, 11 June 1987 ===
In the late 1980s, the NF split into the Flag Group and the Official National Front. The latter stood no candidates whereas the former only stood one in Bristol East as an 'Independent NF'.

Date of election	Constituency	Candidate	Votes	%
1987	Bristol East	Paul Kingston	286	0.6

=== By-elections, 1987–92 ===
Date of election	Constituency	Candidate	Votes	%
18 December 1988	Epping Forest	Tina Wingfield	286	0.6
15 June 1989	Vauxhall	Ted Budden	83	0.3
15 June 1989	Vauxhall	Patrick Harrington (as "Independent National Front")	127	0.4%
22 March 1990	Mid Staffordshire	C J G Hill	311	0.5
18 October 1990	Eastbourne	J McAuley	154	0.3
9 November 1990	Bradford North	R I Tenney	305	0.8

=== General election, 9 April 1992 ===
Constituency	Candidate	Votes	%
Birmingham Hodge Hill	E Whicker	370	0.9
Birmingham Yardley	P Read	192	0.4
Bristol East	Ian Anderson	270	0.5
Coventry South East	N Tomkinson	173	0.5
Derby North	P Hart	245	0.4
Dudley East	G Cartwright	675	1.2
Ealing North	C J G Hill	277	0.6
Leeds West	R I Tenney	132	0.3
Slough	A Carmichael	290	0.5
Southwark and Bermondsey	T Blackham	168	0.4
Torbay	R Jones	268	0.5
Walsall North	K Reynolds	614	1.2
West Bromwich East	J Lord	477	1.1
West Hertfordshire	J McAuley	665	1.0

=== By-elections, 1992–97 ===
Date of election	Constituency	Candidate	Votes	%
9 June 1994	Barking	G Needs	551	2.9
15 December 1994	Dudley West	A Carmichael	561	1.4

=== General election, 1 May 1997 ===
Constituency	Candidate	Votes	%
Beckenham	J McAuley	388	0.7
Bromley and Chislehurst	M Stoneman	369	0.7
Dudley North	G Cartwright	559	1.2
Hayes and Harlington	G Hutchins	504	1.2
Lewisham East	R Croucher	431	1.2
Walsall North	A Humphries	465	1.1

=== By-elections, 1997–2001 ===
Date of election	Constituency	Candidate	Votes	%
31 July 1997	Uxbridge	John McAuley	110	0.3
20 November 1997	Beckenham	J McAuley	267	0.8

=== General election, 7 June 2001 ===
Constituency	Candidate	Votes	%
Birmingham Erdington	M Shore	681	2.2
North Southwark and Bermondsey	Miss L Shore	612	1.7
North Thanet	Tom Holmes	395	0.9
South Thanet	B Franklin	242	0.6
Wolverhampton South East	J Barry	554	2.0

=== By-elections, 2001–2005 ===
Date of election	Constituency	Candidate	Votes	%
15 July 2004	Birmingham Hodge Hill	James Starkey	805	3.9
30 September 2004	Hartlepool	James Starkey	246	0.8

=== General election, 5 May 2005 ===
Constituency	Candidate	Votes	%
Banbury	J Starkey	918	1.6
Brentford and Isleworth	M Stoneman	523	1.1
Birmingham Erdington	T Williams	416	1.3
Feltham and Heston	G Kemp	975	2.6
Halifax	Tom Holmes	191	0.5
Lewisham East	B Franklin	625	2.0
Manchester Central	R Kemp	421	1.4
Newcastle upon Tyne North	R Wood	997	2.6
Peterborough	T Blackham	931	2.3
Ruislip-Northwood	I Edward	841	2.1
Sedgefield	M Farrell	253	0.6
North Southwark and Bermondsey	P Winnett	704	1.9
Uxbridge	P Shaw	284	0.8

=== By-elections, 2005–2010 ===
Date of election	Constituency	Candidate	Votes	%
29 June 2006	Bromley and Chislehurst	Paul Winnett	476	1.6
10 July 2008	Haltemprice and Howden	Tess Culnane	544	2.3

=== General election, 6 May 2010 ===
Although the NF had planned to stand 25 candidates, in the event it fielded only 17. The NF did not compete in Northern Ireland and instead encouraged supporters there to support the Traditional Unionist Voice.

Constituency	Candidate	Votes	%
Birmingham Erdington	Terry Williams	229	0.6
Birmingham Yardley	Paul Morris	349	0.9
Bradford East	Gerry Robinson	222	0.5
Dudley North	Kevin Inman	173	0.4
Faversham and Mid Kent	Graham Kemp	542	1.2
Hayes and Harlington	Andrewy Cripps	566	1.3
Keighley	Steven Smith	135	0.3
Kingston upon Hull East	Joe Uttley	880	2.6
Maidstone and the Weald	Gary Butler	643	1.3
Montgomeryshire	Milton Ellis	384	1.1
Rochdale	Chris Jackson	2,236	4.9
Rossendale and Darwen	Kevin Bryan	1,062	2.3
Ruislip, Northwood and Pinner	Ian Edward	899	1.8
Tonbridge and Malling	Mike Easter	505	1.0
Tyneside North	Bob Batten	599	1.3
Uxbridge and South Ruislip	Frank Mcallister	271	0.6
West Ham	Michael Davidson	1,089	2.3

=== By-elections, 2010–2015 ===
Date of election	Constituency	Candidate	Votes	%
29 November 2012	Croydon North	Richard Edmonds	161	0.7

=== General election, 7 May 2015 ===
Constituency	Candidate	Votes	%
Aberdeen North	Christopher Willett	186	0.4
Bridgend	Adam Lloyd	66	0.2
Carshalton and Wallington	Richard Edmonds	49	0.1
Kingston upon Hull East	Mike Cooper	86	0.2
Linlithgow and East Falkirk	Neil McIvor	103	0.2
North Tyneside	Robert Batten	191	0.4
Rochdale	Kevin Bryan	433	1.0

=== By-elections, 2015–2017 ===
Date of election	Constituency	Candidate	Votes	%
20 October 2016	Batley & Spen	Richard Edmonds	87	0.4

== Scottish Parliament ==
In UK parliamentary elections, the NF has only ever contested 3 Scottish constituencies: Glasgow Govan (October 1974), Glasgow Pollok (1979) and the 1980 Glasgow Central by-election.

The NF stood for the first time ever in the 2011 Scottish Parliamentary elections by fielding 6 candidates - 1 for the North East region and 5 (3 of whom stood for the North East region too) for the constituencies. It failed to save any deposits or win any seats and achieved between 0.8% and 1.6% of the vote in the constituencies it contested (0.08% of the nationwide vote).

=== Scottish Parliament election, 5 May 2011 ===
Source: BBC News

Constituency	Candidate	Votes	%
Aberdeen Central	Mike Phillips	201	0.8
Aberdeen Donside	Christopher Sean Willett	213	0.8
Aberdeen South and North Kincardine	Ross Alexander Willett	214	0.7
Almond Valley	Neil McIvor	329	1.1
Linlithgow	Mike Coyle	558	1.6

Regional lists	Votes	%	+/- %
North East Scotland	640	0.2	n/a

=== By-election ===
Date of Election	Constituency	Candidate	Votes	%
20 June 2013	Aberdeen Donside	Dave MacDonald	249	1.1

=== Scottish Parliament election, 5 May 2016 ===
Source: BBC News

Regional lists	Votes	%	+/- %
North East Scotland	617	0.2	n/a

== London Assembly ==
=== London Assembly election, 1 May 2008 ===
Source: BBC News

Constituency	Candidate	Votes	%
Bexley and Bromley	Paul Winnett	11,288	5.6
City and East	Graham Kemp	2,350	1.3
Ealing and Hillingdon	Ian Edward	7,939	4.5
Greenwich and Lewisham	Tess Culnane	8,509	5.8
South West	Andrew Cripps	4,754	2.5

=== London Assembly election, 3 May 2012 ===
Source: BBC News

Constituency	Candidate	Votes	%
Ealing and Hillingdon	Ian Edward	2,035	1.2
Greenwich and Lewisham	Tess Culnane	1,816	1.4
Havering and Redbridge	Richard Edmonds	1,936	1.4

Regional list	Candidates	Votes	%
London-wide	Tess Culnane, Ian Edward, Andrew Cripps	8,006	0.4

== European Parliament elections ==
The National Front stood in the 1989 and 1994 European elections but has not stood in European elections since as it feels that standing in them is endorsing them.

=== 1989 European Parliament election ===
Constituency	Candidate	Votes	%
Birmingham East	Martin Wingfield	1,471	0.8
	Total	1,471	0.0

=== 1994 European Parliament election ===
Constituency	Candidate	Votes	%
Birmingham West	Andrew Carmichael	3,727	2.6
Hertfordshire	John McAuley	1,755	0.8
London South East	Ken Lowne	2,926	1.7
London West	William Binding	1,963	1.1
Staffordshire East and Derby	R P Jones	2,098	1.1
	Total	12,469	0.1

== See also ==
- British National Party election results
