= British National Party election results =

British National Party (BNP) vote share in the 2010 UK general election.

This article lists the British National Party's election results in the UK parliamentary, Scottish parliamentary and Welsh Assembly elections, as well as in the European Parliament elections and at a local level.

== United Kingdom elections ==
=== Summary of general election performance ===
Year	No. of candidates	Total votes	Average votes per candidate	% of vote	Change (% points)	Saved deposits^{*}	No. of MPs	Rank
1983	53	14,621	276	0.0	N/A	0	0	17/29 ▲
1987	2	553	277	0.0	0.0	0	0	18/18 ▼
1992	13	7,631	587	0.1	+0.1	0	0	18/27
1997	56	35,832	640	0.1	0.0	3	0	16/35 ▲
2001	33	47,129	1,428	0.2	+0.1	7	0	15/34 ▲
2005	119	192,746	1,620	0.7	+0.5	34	0	8/42 ▲
2010	338	563,743	1,668	1.9	+1.2	73	0	5/38 ▲
2015	8	1,667	208	0.0	−1.9	0	0	29/50 ▼
2017	10	4,642	406	0.1	0.0+	0	0	17/? ▲
2019	1	510	510	0.0	0.1-	0	0	TBD

^{*} Note: Until 1985, a deposit was saved on securing 12½% of the votes cast; from 1985, this was reduced to 5%.

=== General election, 9 June 1983 ===
This was the first general election after the formation of the BNP following the disintegration of the National Front (NF) in the early 1980s. The BNP stood 53 candidates in order to be eligible for the five-minute national television broadcast offered to all parties running fifty candidates or more. Although the party did not anticipate winning any seats (as was the case) the election was pivotal in ensuring that its profile was raised, with 13 million viewers watching the broadcast. The NF itself contested 61 seats, a significant drop from the 303 it had contested in 1979. Only three constituencies (Hackney S & Shoreditch, Islington S & Finsbury and Worthing) were contested by both parties and in all three the NF beat the BNP. However, their combined vote in each of these constituencies was roughly half of what the NF had secured previously.

38 of the seats contested by the BNP had been contested by the NF in 1979. However, the BNP vote in all but one was lower than the NF had previously achieved. (The exception was Carmarthen: NF 149 in 1979; BNP 154 in 1983.)

BNP results ranged from 94 to 632 votes. Its share of votes ranged from 0.2% to 1.3%.

Constituency	Candidate	Votes	%
Ashford	R Lockwood	195	0.4
Basingstoke	I Wilson	344	0.6
Beckenham	G Younger	203	0.5
Bolton North East	D Ball	186	0.4
Bournemouth West	John Morse	180	0.4
Bradford North	M Easter	193	0.4
Broxbourne	J Smith	502	1.0
Carmarthen	C Grice	154	0.3
Chislehurst	A Waite	201	0.5
Ealing North	J Shaw	306	0.6
Edmonton	D Bruce	372	0.8
Eltham	P Banks	276	0.7
Enfield North	J Billingham	268	0.5
Enfield Southgate	M Braithwaite	318	0.7
Epping Forest	S Smith	330	0.7
Erith and Crayford	O Hawke	272	0.7
Glasgow Shettleston	K Hill	103	0.3
Gloucester	R Rhodes	260	0.5
Greenwich	I Dell	259	0.7
Hackney South and Shoreditch	Mrs Valerie Tyndall	374	1.0
Harborough	J Taylor	280	0.5
Hertford and Stortford	G Wiles	304	0.6
Heywood and Middleton	K Henderson	316	0.8
Ilford South	R Martin	316	0.8
Ipswich	A Pearson	235	0.5
Islington North	L Bearsford-Walker	176	0.5
Islington South and Finsbury	D Stentiford	94	0.2
Leeds Central	G Cummins	331	0.9
Leeds West	A Braithwaite	334	0.7
Leicester East	R Sutton	459	0.9
Leicester South	C Pickard	280	0.3
Leicester West	Ray Hill	469	1.0
Lewisham Deptford	P Wilson	317	0.9
Lewisham East	Richard Edmonds	288	0.7
Lewisham West	R Hoy	336	0.8
Liverpool Walton	D McKechnie	343	0.7
Loughborough	J Peacock	228	0.4
Manchester Gorton	L Andrews	231	0.5
Milton Keynes	R Rickcord	290	0.5
Orpington	L Taylor	215	0.5
Plymouth Drake	C Bradbury	163	0.4
Ravensbourne	A Shotton	242	0.6
Reading East	P Baker	147	0.3
Stevenage	D Bowmaker	236	0.5
Thanet North	B Dobing	324	0.7
Thurrock	R Sinclair	252	0.6
Wakefield	V Parker	295	0.6
Walsall South	J Parker	632	1.3
Warrington North	I Sloan	267	0.5
Woolwich	T Fitz-Gerald	384	1.0
Worcester	K Axon	208	0.4
Worthing	D Monks	103	0.2
York	T Bratten	148	0.3
	Total	14,621	0.0

=== By-elections, 1983–87 ===
Date of election	Constituency	Candidate	Votes	%
26 February 1987	Greenwich	I B Dell	116	0.3

=== General election, 11 June 1987 ===
With party finances strained, leader John Tyndall decided not to fight this election. The party's Bromley officer Alf Waite and West Kent chief Michael Easter both broke rank and stood as candidates and, despite attempts by Tyndall to maintain unity, some of Waite and Easter's supporters split from the BNP to join the Flag Group after the election.

Constituency	Candidate	Votes	%
Ravensbourne	A Waite	184	0.4
Tonbridge and Malling	M Easter	369	0.6
	Total	553	0.0

=== General election, 9 April 1992 ===
Although a wider slate of candidates was put forward than in 1987, the party concentrated its campaigning efforts on the East London constituencies of Bethnal Green and Stepney and Bow and Poplar on the back of some relatively strong performances in local elections in the early 1990s. The party's first elected representative to a borough council, Derek Beackon, would be elected in this area the following year.

BNP results ranged from 121 to 1310 votes. Its share of votes ranged from 0.3% to 3.6%.

Constituency	Candidate	Votes	%
Bethnal Green and Stepney	Richard Edmonds	1,310	3.6
Blaby	J Peacock	521	0.8
Bow and Poplar	John Tyndall	1,107	3.0
Cardiff North	John Morse	121	0.3
Clydesdale	S Cartwright	342	0.7
Darlington	D Clarke	355	0.6
Dewsbury	Lady Jane Birdwood	660	1.1
Edinburgh West	D Bruce	133	0.3
Erewash	L Johnson	645	1.0
Peterborough	R Heaton	311	0.5
Rochdale	K Henderson	620	1.2
Southwark and Bermondsey	S Tyler	530	1.4
Uxbridge	M O'Rourke	350	0.7
	Total	7,631	0.1

=== By-elections, 1992–97 ===
Date of election	Constituency	Candidate	Votes	%
9 June 1994	Dagenham	John Tyndall	1,511	7.0

=== General election, 1 May 1997 ===
Both Tyndall and Tony Lecomber felt that recruitment of new members was of central importance to the growth of the BNP and it was agreed that a larger scale general election campaign was needed in order to accomplish this. The party spent £60,000 on their election campaign, although ultimately it had no great impact on volume of membership.

BNP results ranged from 149 to 3350 votes. Its share of votes ranged from 0.4% to 7.5%.

Constituency	Candidate	Votes	%
Aldershot	D Stevens	322	0.6
Ashfield	S Belshaw	595	1.2
Barking	M Toleman	894	2.7
Batley and Spen	R Smith	472	1.0
Bethnal Green and Bow	D King	3,350	7.5
Bexleyheath and Crayford	Ms P Smith	429	0.9
Birmingham Edgbaston	D Campbell	443	0.9
Birmingham Northfield	K Axon	337	0.9
Birmingham Perry Barr	L Windridge	544	1.2
Blaby	J Peacock	523	1.0
Blackpool North and Fleetwood	J Ellis	288	0.5
Bournemouth West	John Morse	165	0.4
Bradford West	G Osborn	893	1.8
Bristol North West	S Parnell	265	0.5
Broxbourne	D Bruce	610	1.3
Calder Valley	C Jackson	431	0.8
Carshalton and Wallington	G Ritchie	261	0.5
Charnwood	M Palmer	525	0.9
Chingford and Woodford Green	A Gould	1,059	2.4
Clydesdale	K Smith	311	0.7
Coventry South	J Astbury	328	0.7
Croydon South	P Ferguson	354	0.7
Dagenham	W Binding	900	2.5
Dartford	P McHale	424	0.8
Dewsbury	Ms F Taylor	2,232	5.2
East Ham	C Smith	1,258	3.2
Edmonton	B Cowd	437	1.0
Eltham	W Hitches	491	1.1
Enfield North	Mrs Jean Griffin	590	1.2
Epping Forest	P Henderson	743	1.4
Erith and Thamesmead	V Dooley	718	1.7
Feltham and Heston	R Church	682	1.5
Gillingham	C Jury	195	0.4
Glasgow Govan	J White	149	0.5
Glasgow Shettleston	R Currie	191	0.6
Hackney South and Shoreditch	G Callow	531	1.6
Harlow	J Bowles	319	0.9
Ilford North	P Wilson	755	1.6
Ilford South	A Owens	580	1.2
Kingswood	P Hart	290	0.5
Leicester West	A Belshaw	302	0.7
Leominster	J Haycock	292	0.6
Mitcham and Morden	L Miller	521	1.1
Morley and Rothwell	R Wood	381	0.8
Old Bexley and Sidcup	Mrs Valerie Tyndall	415	0.8
Poplar and Canning Town	John Tyndall	2,849	7.3
Reading East	Ms B Packer	238	0.5
Reading West	I Dell	320	0.7
Rochdale	G Bergin	653	1.4
Romford	M Carey	522	1.2
Rossendale and Darwen	A Wearden	674	1.3
Sherwood	P Ballard	432	0.8
Southwark North and Bermondsey	M Davidson	713	1.8
Stoke-on-Trent Central	M Coleman	806	1.5
Stoke-on-Trent South	S Batkin	568	1.2
Taunton	L Andrews	318	0.5
West Ham	Kenneth Francis	1,198	3.6
	Total	35,832	0.1

=== By-elections, 1997–2001 ===
Date of election	Constituency	Candidate	Votes	%
31 July 1997	Uxbridge	Ms. F Taylor	205	0.7
23 November 2000	Preston	Christian Jackson	229	1.1
23 November 2000	West Bromwich West	Nick Griffin	974	4.2

=== General election, 7 June 2001 ===
On the back of an intense local campaign that had been bolstered by the tensions around the 2001 Oldham race riots, the BNP secured their best ever general election result in Oldham West and Royton where party leader Nick Griffin secured 16.4% of the vote.

BNP results ranged from 278 to 6,552 votes. Its share of votes ranged from 0.8% to 16.4%.

Constituency	Candidate	Votes	%
Ashton-under-Lyne	R Woods	1,617	4.5
Barking	M Tolman	1,606	6.4
Bethnal Green and Bow	M Davidson	1,211	3.2
Bexleyheath and Crayford	C Smith	1,408	3.5
Birmingham Hodge Hill	L Windridge	889	3.3
Blaby	E Scott	1,375	2.8
Bradford North	J Brayshaw	1,613	4.6
Broxbourne	J Cope	848	2.2
Burnley	S Smith	4,151	11.3
Chingford and Woodford Green	Mrs Jean Griffin	1,062	2.9
Coventry North East	E Sheppard	937	2.0
Croydon Central	L Miller	449	1.0
Dagenham	D Hill	1,378	5.0
Dewsbury	R Smith	1,632	4.5
Dudley North	Simon Darby	1,882	4.7
Enfield North	R Johns	605	1.6
Erewash	S Belshaw	591	1.2
Hayes and Harlington	G Birch	705	2.2
Leicester East	C Potter	772	1.9
Lewisham East	B Roberts	1,005	3.3
Mitcham and Morden	John Tyndall	642	1.7
Newport West	T Cavill	278	0.8
Oldham East and Saddleworth	M Treacy	5,091	11.2
Oldham West and Royton	Nick Griffin	6,552	16.4
Pendle	C Jackson	1,976	5.0
Poplar and Canning Town	P Borg	1,733	5.1
Romford	F McAllister	414	1.2
Ruislip Northwood	I Edwards	547	1.5
Stoke-on-Trent South	S Batkin	1,358	3.8
Sunderland North	D Guynan	687	2.3
Sunderland South	J Dobbie	576	1.8
Walthamstow	W Phillips	389	1.1
West Bromwich West	J Salvage	1,428	4.5

=== General election, 5 May 2005 ===
BNP results ranged from 376 to 5,066 votes. Its share of votes ranged from 0.8% to 17.0%. In total 34 BNP candidates polled 5% or more and saved their deposit. The highest percentage was achieved in Barking by Richard Barnbrook, later to be elected to the London Assembly in 2008 when the BNP passed the 5% threshold and thus qualified for a single seat.

Constituency	Candidate	Votes	%
Aldridge-Brownhills	W Vaughan	1,620	4.1
Amber Valley	P Snell	1,243	2.6
Ashton-under-Lyne	A Jones	2,051	5.5
Barking	Richard Barnbrook	4,916	17.0
Barnsley Central	G Broadley	1,403	4.9
Basildon	Miss E Colgate	2055	4.8
Basingstoke	R Robertson	821	1.7
Batley and Spen	C Auty	2,668	6.8
Bexleyheath and Crayford	Jay Lee	1,245	2.9
Billericay	B Robinson	1,435	2.9
Birmingham Erdington	Sharon Ebanks	1,512	4.8
Birmingham Hodge Hill	D Adams	1,445	5.1
Birmingham Northfield	M Cattell	1,278	4.1
Birmingham Yardley	R Purcell	1,523	5.2
Blaby	M Robinson	1,704	3.5
Blackburn	N Holt	2,263	5.4
Blackpool South	R Goodwin	1,113	2.9
Boston and Skegness	Ms W Russell	1,025	2.5
Bradford North	Ms L Cromie	2,061	6.0
Bradford South	J Lewthwaite	2,862	7.8
Bradford West	Paul Cromie	2,525	6.9
Broxbourne	A Emerson	1,929	4.7
Burnley	L Starr	4,003	10.3
Burton	Ms J Russell	1,840	3.8
Bury North	S Clough	1,790	4.0
Calder Valley	J Gregory	1,887	4.0
Charnwood	A Holders	1,737	3.4
Cheadle	R Chadfield	421	0.9
Colne Valley	B Fowler	1,430	2.9
Coventry North West	D Clarke	1,556	3.6
Crawley	R Trower	1,277	3.0
Dagenham	Lawrence Rustem	2,870	9.3
Denton and Reddish	J Edgar	1,326	3.7
Derbyshire South	D Joines	1,797	3.2
Dewsbury	D Exley	5,066	13.1
Doncaster Central	J Wilkinson	1,239	3.6
Doncaster North	L Hagan	1,506	4.8
Dudley North	Simon Darby	4,022	9.7
Dudley South	J Salvage	1,841	4.7
Easington	I McDonald	1,042	3.3
Elmet	Ms T Andrews	1,231	2.6
Eltham	B Roberts	979	2.8
Enfield North	T Farr	1,004	2.5
Epping Forest	J Leppert	1,728	3.9
Erewash	Mrs S Graham	1,319	2.6
Erith and Thamesmead	B Ravenscroft	1,620	4.3
Glasgow Central	W Hamilton	671	2.4
Glasgow North East	S McLean	920	3.2
Great Grimsby	S Fyfe	1,338	4.1
Halifax	G Wallace	2,627	6.6
Haltemprice and Howden	J Mainprize	798	1.7
Harrogate and Knaresborough	C Banner	466	1.1
Havant	I Johnson	652	1.4
Hayes and Harlington	T Hazel	830	2.6
Heywood and Middleton	G Aronsson	1,855	4.7
Hornchurch	I Moore	1,313	3.4
Houghton and Washington East	J Richardson	1,367	3.9
Huddersfield	K Hanson	1,036	3.0
Hyndburn	C Jackson	2,444	6.2
Keighley	Nick Griffin	4,240	9.2
Kingston upon Hull East	A Siddle	1,022	3.3
Kingston upon Hull North	B Wainwright	766	2.6
Knowsley North and Sefton East	M McDermott	872	2.4
Leeds Central	Mark Collett	1,201	4.1
Leeds West	Mrs J Day	1,167	3.5
Leicestershire North West	C Potter	1,474	3.1
Maidenhead	T Rait	704	1.5
Makerfield	D Shambley	1,221	3.4
Middlesbrough	R Armes	819	2.5
Middlesbrough South and East Cleveland	G Groves	1,099	2.5
Morley and Rothwell	C Beverley	2,271	5.3
Newcastle-under-Lyme	J Dawson	1,390	3.5
Normanton	J Aveyard	1,967	5.3
Old Bexley and Sidcup	Miss C Sayers	1,227	2.8
Oldham East and Saddleworth	M Treacy	2,109	4.9
Oldham West and Royton	Mrs A Corbett	2,606	6.9
Pendle	T Boocock	2,547	6.2
Pontefract and Castleford	Ms S Cass	1,835	5.6
Poole	P Pirnie	547	1.4
Redcar	A Harris	985	2.5
Rochdale	D Adams	1,773	4.3
Romford	J McCaffrey	1,088	3.0
Rossendale and Darwen	Anthony Wentworth	1,736	3.9
Rother Valley	N Cass	2,020	5.1
Rotherham	Mrs M Guest	1,986	6.6
Sheffield Attercliffe	Mrs B Jones	1,477	4.0
Sheffield Brightside	C Hartigan	1,537	6.2
Sheffield Central	M Payne	539	1.8
Sheffield Hallam	I Senior	469	1.2
Sheffield Heeley	J Beatson	1,314	3.9
Sheffield Hillsborough	D Wright	2,010	4.4
Shipley	T Linden	2,000	4.2
Solihull	Mrs D Carr	1,752	3.3
Stalybridge and Hyde	N Byrne	1,399	4.0
Stockton North	K Hughes	986	2.7
Stoke-on-Trent Central	M Coleman	2,178	7.8
Stoke-on-Trent North	S Cartlidge	2,132	6.9
Stoke-on-Trent South	M Leat	3,305	8.7
Sunderland North	Miss D Hiles	1,136	3.9
Sunderland South	D Guynan	1,166	3.8
Swansea East	K Holloway	770	2.5
Thurrock	N Geri	2,526	5.8
Tyne Bridge	K Scott	1,072	4.1
Upminster	C Roberts	1173	3.4
Uxbridge	C le May	763	2.2
Wakefield	G Rowe	1,328	3.1
Walsall North	W Locke	1,992	6.0
Walsall South	K Smith	1,776	5.0
Warley	Simon Smith	1,761	5.5
Warwickshire North	Ms M Mackenzie	1,910	4.1
Wentworth	J Pygott	1,798	5.1
West Bromwich East	C Butler	2,329	6.6
West Bromwich West	J Lloyd	3,456	9.9
Weston-super-Mare	C Courtney	778	1.6
Wokingham	R Colborne	376	0.8
Wolverhampton South West	E Mullins	983	2.4
Woodspring	M Howson	633	1.2
Worcester	M Roberts	980	2.1
Wrexham	J Walker	919	3.0
	Total	192,746	0.7

=== By-elections, 2005–10 ===
Date of election	Constituency	Candidate	Votes	%
19 July 2007	Sedgefield	Andrew Spence	2,494	8.9
26 June 2008	Henley	Timothy Rait	1,243	3.6
23 July 2009	Norwich North	Rev. Robert West	941	2.7
12 November 2009	Glasgow North East	Charlie Baillie	1,013	4.9

=== General election, 6 May 2010 ===
The BNP fielded 338 candidates (including 19 in Wales and 14 in Scotland but none in Northern Ireland), nearly three times the number in 2005. Leader Nick Griffin came third in Barking – the constituency it had targeted heavily – while the party lost all 12 of its seats on Barking and Dagenham council. In total 73 BNP candidates polled 5% or more and saved their deposit. The election results followed a campaign in which the BNP website was closed down by its designer, the party's publicity director was arrested on suspicion of threatening to kill Griffin and a candidate in London was filmed fighting in the street with a group of Asian teenagers. Votes polled ranged from 150 to 6,620. The percentage of votes ranged from 0.4% to 14.6%. The average was 1.9%.

Constituency	Candidate	Votes	%
Aberavon	Kevin Edwards	1,276	4.1
Aberdeen North	Roy Jones	635	1.7
Aberdeen South	Susan Ross	529	1.2
Aberdeenshire West & Kincardine	Gary Raikes	513	1.1
Alyn and Deeside	John Walker	1,368	3.4
Amber Valley	Michael Clarke	3,195	7.0
Ashfield	Edward Holmes	2,781	5.8
Ashton-under-Lyne	David Lomas	2,929	7.6
Banff and Buchan	Richard Payne	1,010	2.6
Barking	Nick Griffin	6,620	14.6
Barnsley Central	Ian Sutton	3,307	8.9
Barnsley East	Colin Porter	3,301	8.6
Barrow and Furness	Mike Ashburner	840	1.9
Basildon and Billericay	Irene Bateman	1,934	4.6
Basildon South and Thurrock East	Chris Roberts	2,518	5.6
Batley and Spen	David Exley	3,685	7.1
Beckenham	Roger Tonks	1,001	2.1
Bedford	William Dewick	757	1.7
Bedfordshire North East	Ian Seeby	1,265	2.3
Bedfordshire South West	Mark Tolman	1,703	3.4
Bermondsey and Old Southwark	Stephen Tyler	1,370	3.1
Berwick-upon-Tweed	Peter Mailer	1,213	3.2
Bethnal Green and Bow	Jeffrey Marshall	1,405	2.8
Beverley and Holderness	Neil Whitelam	2,080	3.9
Bexhill and Battle	Neil Jackson	1,950	3.6
Bexleyheath and Crayford	Stephen James	2,042	4.7
Birmingham Edgbaston	Trevor Lloyd	1,196	2.9
Birmingham Erdington	Kevin McHugh	1,815	5.1
Birmingham Hodge Hill	Richard Lumby	2,333	5.5
Birmingham Northfield	Les Orton	2,290	5.5
Birmingham Selly Oak	Lynette Orton	1,820	3.9
Birmingham Yardley	Tanya Lumby	2,153	5.3
Bishop Auckland	Adam Walker	2,036	4.9
Blackburn	Robin Evans	2,158	4.7
Blackley and Broughton	Derek Adams	2,469	7.2
Blackpool North & Cleveleys	James Clayton	1,556	3.8
Blackpool South	Roy Goodwin	1,482	4.2
Blaenau Gwent	Anthony King	1,211	3.7
Blaydon	Keith McFarlane	2,277	5.1
Blyth Valley	Steve Fairburn	1,699	4.4
Bognor Regis and Littlehampton	Andrew Moffat	1,890	4.0
Bolsover	Martin Radford	2,640	6.0
Bolton South East	Shelia Spink	2,012	5.1
Bootle	Charles Stewart	942	2.3
Boston and Skegness	David Owens	2,278	5.3
Bosworth	John Ryde	2,458	4.5
Bracknell	Mark Burke	1,253	2.4
Bradford East	Neville Poynton	1,854	4.6
Bradford South	Sharon Sutton	2,651	7.0
Bradford West	Jenny Sampson	1,370	3.4
Braintree	Paul Hooks	1,080	2.2
Brentford and Isleworth	Paul Winnet	704	1.3
Brentwood and Ongar	Paul Morris	1,447	2.9
Bridgend	Brian Urch	1,020	2.7
Bridgwater and West Somerset	Donna Treanor	1,282	2.4
Brigg and Goole	Steve Ward	1,498	3.4
Bristol East	Brian Jenkins	1,960	4.4
Bristol South	Colin Chidsey	1,739	3.6
Broadland	Edith Crowther	871	1.7
Bromley and Chislehurst	Rowena Savage	1,070	2.4
Bromsgrove	Elizabeth Wainwright	1,923	3.7
Broxbourne	Steve McCole	2,159	4.7
Broxtowe	Michael Shore	1,422	2.7
Buckingham	Lynne Mozar	980	2.0
Burnley	Sharon Wilkinson	3,747	9.0
Burton	Alan Hewitt	2,409	4.8
Bury North	John Maude	1,825	4.1
Bury South	Jean Purdy	1,743	3.6
Caerphilly	Laurence Reid	1,635	4.2
Calder Valley	John Gregory	1,823	3.5
Cambridgeshire North East	Susan Clapp	1,747	3.3
Cannock Chase	Terence Majorowicz	2,168	4.8
Carlisle	Paul Stafford	1,086	2.6
Carshalton and Wallington	Charlotte Lewis	1,100	2.4
Castle Point	Phil Howell	2,205	4.9
Charnwood	Cathy Duffy	3,116	5.8
Chatham and Aylesford	Colin McCarthy-Stewart	1,365	3.1
Chelmsford	Mike Bateman	899	1.6
Cheslea and Fulham	Brian MacDonald	388	1.0
Chingford and Woodford Green	Julian Leppert	1,288	3.0
Chippenham	Michael Simpkins	641	1.2
Clacton	Jim Taylor	1,975	4.6
Clwyd South	Sarah Hynes	1,100	3.2
Colchester	Sidney Chaney	705	1.5
Colne Valley	Barry Fowler	1,893	3.4
Copeland	Clive Jefferson	1,474	3.4
Corby	Roy Davies	2,525	4.7
Coventry North East	Tom Gower	1,863	3.4
Coventry North West	Edward Sheppard	1,666	3.6
Crawley	Richard Trower	1,672	3.5
Crewe and Nantwich	Phil Williams	1,043	2.0
Croydon Central	Cliff Le May	1,448	2.9
Dagenham and Rainham	Michael Barnbrook	4,952	11.2
Darlington	Amanda Foster	1,262	2.9
Delyn	Jennifer Matthys	844	2.3
Derby North	Peter Cheeseman	2,000	4.4
Derbyshire Mid	Lewis Allsebrook	1,698	3.6
Derbyshire South	Peter Jarvis	2,193	4.3
Devon North	Gary Marshall	614	1.2
Devon West and Torridge	Nick Baker	766	1.4
Dewsbury	Roger Roberts	3,265	6.0
Don Valley	Erwin Toseland	2,112	4.9
Doncaster Central	John Bettney	1,762	4.2
Doncaster North	Pamela Chambers	2,818	6.8
Dover	Dennis Whiting	1,104	2.2
Dudley North	Ken Griffiths	1,899	4.9
Durham, City of	Ralph Musgrave	1,153	2.5
Durham North	Peter Molloy	1,686	4.1
Durham North West	Michael Stewart	1,852	4.2
Ealing North	Dave Furness	1,045	2.2
Easington	Cheryl Dunn	2,317	6.6
Eastbourne	Colin Poulter	939	1.8
Elmet and Rothwell	Sam Clayton	1,802	3.2
Eltham	Roberta Woods	1,745	4.2
Enfield North	Tony Avery	1,228	2.8
Epping Forest	Patricia Richardson	1,982	4.3
Erewash	Mark Bailey	2,337	4.9
Erith and Thamesmead	Kevin Saunders	2,184	5.1
Exeter	Robert Farmer	673	1.3
Feltham and Heston	John Donnelly	1,714	3.5
Filton and Bradley Stoke	David Scott	1,328	2.7
Folkestone and Hythe	Harry Williams	1,662	3.1
Gainsborough	Malcolm Porter	1,512	3.1
Gateshead	Kevin Scott	1,787	4.7
Gedling	Stephen Adcock	1,598	3.3
Gillingham and Rainham	Brian Ravenscroft	1,149	2.5
Glasgow Central	Ian Holt	616	2.0
Glasgow East	Joseph Finnie	677	2.1
Glasgow North	Thomas Main	296	1.0
Glasgow North East	Walter Hamilton	798	2.7
Glasgow North West	Scott McLean	699	2.0
Glasgow South	Mike Coyle	637	1.6
Glasgow South West	David Orr Jnr	841	2.6
Gordon	Elise Jones	699	1.4
Gosport	Barry Bennett	1,004	2.1
Gower	Adrian Jones	963	2.3
Grantham and Stamford	Christopher Robinson	2,485	4.7
Great Grimsby	Steve Fyfe	1,517	4.6
Great Yarmouth	Bosco Tann	1,421	3.3
Greenwich and Woolwich	Lawrence Rustem	1,151	2.8
Halifax	Tom Bates	2,760	6.3
Haltemprice and Howden	James Cornell	1,583	3.2
Halton	Andrew Taylor	1,563	3.8
Hammersmith	Lawrence Searle	432	0.9
Hampstead and Kilburn	Victoria Moore	328	0.6
Harborough	Geoff Dickens	1,715	3.1
Harlow	Eddy Butler	1,739	4.0
Harrogate and Knaresborough	Steven Gill	1,094	2.1
Hartlepool	Ronnie Bage	2,002	5.2
Harwich and North Essex	Stephen Robey	1,065	2.2
Hastings and Rye	Nicholas Prince	1,310	2.6
Hayes and Harlington	Chris Forster	1,520	3.6
Hemel Hempstead	Janet Price	1,615	3.3
Hemsworth	Ian Kitchen	3,059	7.0
Henley	John Bews	1,020	1.9
Hereford & Herefordshire South	John Oliver	986	2.0
Hertford and Stortford	Roy Harris	1,297	2.3
Hertfordshire South West	Deirdre Gates	1,302	2.3
Hertsmere	Daniel Seabrook	1,397	3.0
Hexham	Quentin Hawkins	1,205	2.8
Heywood and Middleton	Peter Greenwood	3,239	7.0
Holborn and St Pancras	Robert Carlyle	779	1.4
Hornchurch and Upminster	William Whelpley	3,421	6.4
Houghton and Sunderland South	Karen Allen	1,961	5.4
Huddersfield	Rachel Firth	1,563	3.9
Hyndburn	David Shapcott	2,137	5.0
Ilford North	Danny Warville	1,545	3.3
Ipswich	Dennis Boater	1,270	2.7
Isle of Wight	Geof Clynch	1,457	2.1
Islwyn	John Voisey	1,320	3.8
Jarrow	Andy Swaddle	2,709	7.0
Keighley	Andrew Brons	1,962	4.1
Kettering	Clive Skinner	1,366	2.9
Kingston upon Hull North	John Mainprize	1,443	4.3
Kingston upon Hull West and Hessle	Edward Scott	1,416	4.5
Kingswood	Michael Carey	1,311	2.7
Knowsley	Steven Greenhalgh	1,895	4.2
Lancaster and Fleetwood	Debra Kent	938	2.2
Leeds Central	Kevin Meeson	3,066	8.2
Leeds East	Trevor Brown	2,947	7.8
Leeds North East	Tom Redmond	758	1.6
Leeds North West	Geoffrey Bulmer	766	1.8
Leeds West	Joanna Beverley	2,377	6.1
Leicester East	Colin Gilmore	1,700	3.5
Leicester South	Adrian Waudby	1,418	3.0
Leicester West	Gary Reynolds	2,158	6.0
Leicestershire North West	Ian Meller	3,396	6.5
Leicestershire South	Paul Preston	2,721	5.0
Leigh	Gary Chadwick	2,724	5.8
Lewes	David Lloyd	594	1.2
Leyton and Wanstead	Jim Clift	561	1.4
Lincoln	Robert West	1,367	3.0
Liverpool Riverside	Peter Stafford	706	1.8
Liverpool Walton	Peter Stafford	1,104	3.2
Liverpool Wavertree	Steven McEllenborough	150	0.4
Livingston	David Orr	960	2.0
Loughborough	Kevan Stafford	2,040	3.9
Louth and Horncastle	Julia Green	2,199	4.4
Ludlow	Christina Evans	1,016	2.1
Luton North	Shelley Rose	1,316	3.1
Luton South	Tony Blakey	1,299	3.1
Maidenhead	Tim Rait	825	1.5
Makerfield	Ken Haslam	3,229	7.4
Maldon	Len Blaine	1,454	3.1
Manchester Central	Tony Trebilcock	1,636	4.1
Mansfield	Rachel Hill	2,108	4.4
Meriden	Frank O'Brien	2,511	4.8
Merthyr Tydfil and Rhymney	Richard Barnes	1,173	3.7
Middlesbrough	Michael Ferguson	1,954	5.8
Middlesbrough South and Cleveland East	Shaun Gatley	1,576	3.4
Milton Keynes North	Richard Hamilton	1,154	2.1
Milton Keynes South	Matthew Tait	1,502	2.7
Mitcham and Morden	Tony Martin	1,386	3.2
Morley and Outwood	Chris Beverley	3,535	7.2
Neath	Michael Green	1,342	3.6
Newcastle upon Tyne Central	Ken Booth	2,302	6.7
Newcastle upon Tyne East	Alan Spence	1,342	3.5
Newcastle upon Tyne North	Terry Gibson	1,890	4.3
Newport East	Keith Jones	1,168	3.4
Newport West	Timothy Windsor	1,183	3.0
Norfolk Mid	Christine Kelly	1,261	2.5
Norfolk North West	David Fleming	1,839	3.8
Norfolk South	Helen Mitchell	1,086	2.0
Norfolk South West	Dennis Pearce	1,774	3.6
Normanton, Pontefract and Castleford	Graham Thewlis-Hardy	3,864	8.4
Northampton North	Ray Beasley	1,316	3.3
Norwich North	Thomas Richardson	747	1.8
Norwich South	Len Heather	697	1.5
Nottingham North	Bob Brindley	1,944	5.7
Nottingham South	Tony Woodward	1,140	2.8
Nuneaton	Martyn Findley	2,797	6.3
Ogmore	Kay Thomas	1,242	3.6
Old Bexley and Sidcup	John Brooks	2,132	4.7
Oldham East and Saddleworth	Alwyn Scott	2,546	5.7
Oldham West and Royton	Dave Joines	3,049	7.1
Orpington	Tess Cullnane	1,241	2.5
Pendle	James Jackman	2,894	6.4
Penistone and Stocksbridge	Paul James	2,207	4.7
Penrith and The Border	Chris Davidson	1,093	2.4
Plymouth Moor View	Roy Cook	1,438	3.5
Poole	David Holmes	1,188	2.5
Portsmouth South	Geoff Crompton	873	2.1
Pudsey	Ian Gibson	1,549	3.2
Putney	Peter Darby	459	1.1
Rayleigh and Wickford	Tony Evennett	2,160	4.1
Redcar	Kevin Broughton	1,475	3.5
Redditch	Andy Ingram	1,394	3.2
Reigate	Keith Brown	1,345	2.7
Rochford and Southend East	Geoff Strobridge	1,856	4.5
Romford	Robert Bailey	2,438	5.2
Rother Valley	Will Blair	3,616	7.7
Rotherham	Marlene Guest	3,906	10.4
Rugby	Mark Badrick	1,375	2.9
Rutland and Melton	Keith Addison	1,757	3.2
Saffron Walden	Christine Mitchell	1,050	1.9
St Austell and Newquay	James Fitton	1,022	2.2
St Helens South and Whiston	James Winstanley	2,040	4.4
Salisbury	Sean Witheridge	765	1.6
Salford and Eccles	Tina Wingfield	2,632	6.3
Scarborough and Whitby	Trisha Scott	1,445	2.9
Scunthorpe	Douglas Ward	1,447	3.9
Sedgefield	Mark Walker	2,075	5.2
Selby and Ainsty	Duncan Lorriman	1,377	2.7
Sevenoaks	Paul Golding	1,384	2.8
Sheffield Brightside and Hillsborough	John Sheldon	3,026	7.8
Sheffield Central	Tracey Smith	903	2.2
Sheffield Heeley	John Beatson	2,260	5.5
Sheffield South East	Christopher Hartigan	2,345	5.7
Sherwood	James North	1,754	3.6
Shrewsbury and Atcham	James Whittall	1,168	2.2
Shropshire North	Phil Reddall	1,667	3.2
Sittingbourne and Sheppey	Lawrence Tames	1,305	2.7
Skipton and Ripon	Bernard Allen	1,403	2.6
Sleaford and North Hykeham	Mike Clayton	1,977	3.3
Solihull	Andrew Terry	1,624	2.9
South Holland and The Deepings	Roy Harban	1,796	3.6
South Ribble	Rosalind Gauci	1,054	2.0
South Shields	Donna Watson	2,382	6.5
Southend West	Tony Gladwin	1,333	3.1
Stafford	Roland Hynd	1,103	2.2
Staffordshire South	David Bradnock	1,928	3.8
Stalybridge and Hyde	Anthony Jones	2,259	5.5
Stevenage	Andrew Green	1,007	2.3
Stockport	Duncan Warner	1,201	3.1
Stockton North	James MacPherson	1,724	4.4
Stockton South	Neil Sinclair	1,553	3.1
Stoke-on-Trent Central	Simon Darby	2,502	7.7
Stoke-on-Trent North	Melanie Baddeley	3,196	8.0
Stoke-on-Trent South	Michael Coleman	3,762	9.4
Stourbridge	Robert Weale	1,696	3.6
Stratford-on-Avon	George Jones	1,097	2.2
Suffolk West	Ramon Johns	1,428	3.0
Sunderland Central	John McCaffrey	1,913	4.5
Surrey South West	Helen Hamilton	644	1.1
Sussex Mid	Stuart Minihane	583	1.0
Sutton and Cheam	John Clarke	1,014	2.1
Sutton Coldfield	Robert Grierson	1,749	3.5
Swansea East	Clive Bennett	1,715	5.2
Swansea West	Alan Bateman	910	2.6
Swindon North	Reginald Bates	1,542	3.1
Telford	Phil Spencer	1,513	3.7
Thurrock	Emma Colgate	3,618	7.9
Torbay	Ann Conway	709	1.4
Torfaen	Jennifer Noble	1,657	4.4
Totnes	Mike Turner	624	1.3
Tunbridge Wells	Andrew Mcbride	704	1.4
Twickenham	Chris Hurst	654	1.1
Tynemouth	Dorothy Brooke	1,404	2.7
Tyneside North	John Burrows	1,860	4.0
Uxbridge and South Ruislip	Dianne Neal	1,396	3.1
Vale of Clwyd	Ian Si'Ree	827	2.3
Wakefield	Ian Senior	2,581	5.8
Walsall North	Christopher Woodall	2,930	8.1
Wansbeck	Stephen Finlay	1,418	3.7
Warwickshire North	Jason Holmes	2,106	4.5
Washington and Sunderland West	Ian McDonald	1,913	5.1
Watford	Andrew Emerson	1,217	2.2
Weaver Vale	Colin Marsh	1,063	2.4
Wellingborough	Rob Walker	1,596	3.1
Wells	Richard Boyce	1,004	1.8
Wentworth and Dearne	George Baldwin	3,189	7.6
West Bromwich East	Terry Lewin	2,205	5.8
West Bromwich West	Russ Green	3,394	9.4
Westminster North	Stephen Curry	334	0.8
Weston-Super-Mare	Peryn Parsons	1,098	2.1
Wigan	Charles Mather	2,506	5.7
Windsor	Peter Phillips	950	1.9
Wolverhampton North East	Simon Patten	2,296	6.6
Worcester	Spencer Lee Kirby	1,219	2.5
Workington	Martin Wingfield	1,496	3.8
Wrekin, The	Susan Harwood	1,505	3.3
Wrexham	Melvin Roberts	1,134	3.4
Wyre Forest	Gordon Howells	1,120	2.2
Wythenshawe and Sale East	Bernard Todd	1,572	3.9
Yeovil	Robert Baehr	1,162	2.0
York Central	Jeff Kelly	1,171	2.5
York Outer	Cathy Smurthwaite	956	1.8
Yorkshire East	Gary Pudsey	1,865	3.6
	Total	563,743	1.9

=== By-elections, 2010–15 ===
Date of election	Constituency	Candidate	Votes	%
13 January 2011	Oldham East and Saddleworth	Derek Adams	1,460	4.5
3 March 2011	Barnsley Central	Enis Dalton	1,463	6.0
15 December 2011	Feltham and Heston	David Furness	540	2.3
15 November 2012	Corby	Gordon Ridell	614	1.7
15 November 2012	Manchester Central	Eddy O' Sullivan	492	3.0
29 November 2012	Rotherham	Marlene Guest	1,804	8.5
29 November 2012	Middlesbrough	Peter Foreman	328	1.9
2 May 2013	South Shields	Lady D MacBeth Brookes	711	2.9
13 February 2014	Wythenshawe and Sale East	Eddy O'Sullivan	708	3.0

=== General election, 7 May 2015 ===
Constituency	Candidate	Votes	%
Boston & Skegness	Robert West	119	0.3
Braintree	Paul Hooks	108	0.2
Charnwood	Cathy Duffy	489	0.9
Dagenham & Rainham	Tess Culnane	151	0.4
Hornchurch & Upminster	Paul Borg	193	0.3
Kingswood	Julie Lake	164	0.3
Old Bexley & Sidcup	Nicola Finch	218	0.5
Rotherham	Adam Walker	225	0.6
	Total	1,667	0.0

=== By-elections, 2015—2017 ===
Date of election	Constituency	Candidate	Votes	%
20 October 2016	Batley & Spen	David Furness	548	2.7
23 February 2017	Stoke-on-Trent Central	David Furness	124	0.6

=== General election, 8 June 2017 ===
Constituency	Candidate	Votes	%
Basildon South & Thurrock East	Paul Borg	383	0.8
Bexleyheath & Crayford	Peter Finch	290	0.6
Bishop Auckland	Adam Walker	991	2.3
Charnwood	Stephen Denham	322	0.6
Dagenham & Rainham	Paul Sturdy	239	0.5
Eltham	John Clarke	738	1.6
Hornchurch & Upminster	David Furness	380	0.7
Maldon	Richard Perry	257	0.5
Old Bexley & Sidcup	Michael Jones	324	0.7
Pendle	Brian Parker	718	1.6
	Total	4,642	

=== General election, 12 December 2019 ===
Constituency	Candidate	Votes	%
Hornchurch & Upminster	David Furness	510	0.9
	Total	510	0.0

== London Assembly and Mayor elections ==
=== Mayor of London ===
Election year	# of overall votes	% of overall vote	+/–	candidate
2000	33,569	2.0% (#7)	▲	Michael Newland
2004	58,407	3.1% (#6)	▲	Julian Leppert
2008	69,710	3.2% (#5)	▲	Richard Barnbrook
2012	28,751	1.3% (#7)	▼	Carlos Cortiglia
2016	13,325	0.5% (#10)	▼	David Furness

=== London Assembly ===
Election year	# of overall votes	% of overall vote	# of seats won	# of overall seats	+/–
2000	47,670	2.8% (#6)	0 / 25	0 / 25	▲
2004	90,365	4.71 (#6)	0 / 25	0 / 25	▲
2008	130,714	5.3% (#5)	0 / 25	1 / 25	▲
2012	47,024	2.1% (#6)	0 / 25	0 / 25	▼
2016	15,833	0.6% (#11)	0 / 25	0 / 25	▼0

== Local elections ==
The BNP's first electoral success came in 1993, when Derek Beackon was returned as a councillor in Millwall, London. He lost his seat in elections the following year. The next BNP success in local elections was not until the 2002 local elections, when three BNP candidates gained seats on Burnley council.

- In 2000, the BNP fielded 17 candidates in 12 councils and polled 3,022 votes. The average share of votes in wards contested was 8%.
- In 2001, the BNP fielded 4 candidates in three councils and polled 867 votes, with an average share of 4% in the wards contested.
- In 2002, the BNP fielded 67 candidates and polled 30,998 votes in 26 local councils. The BNP average share of votes was 16%. Three BNP candidates were elected for the first time in Burnley with an average share of 28.1%.
- In 2003, the BNP fielded a total of 217 candidates in 71 local authorities in England and Scotland. The party won a total of 13 council seats, polling over 101,221 votes and averaging 17% of the vote in those wards where it fielded candidates.

Later in 2003, the BNP won two local by-elections. In the Heckmondwike ward of Kirklees Council in August, David Exley polled 1,607 votes (44%). In September, Nick Geri won the Grays Riverside ward of Thurrock council, polling 552 votes (38%). Later in Burnley, the number of councillors increased, making the BNP briefly the second largest party and the official opposition on that council, a position it lost after the resignation of a BNP councillor who had been disciplined by the party. The BNP stood in the subsequent by-election.

- In 2004, the BNP had 312 candidates stand for election in 59 local authorities in England and Wales, including 25 candidates in Sunderland, 24 in Birmingham and 23 in Leeds. The BNP won 14 council seats and polled 190,200 votes.
- In 2005, the BNP fielded 41 candidates in 18 councils and polled 21,775 votes, averaging 11% share in the contested wards.

The party's biggest election success to date was a gain of 52% of the vote in the Goresbrook ward of Barking in the 2004 local elections. The victorious councillor, Daniel Kelley, retired just 10 months later, claiming he had been an outcast within the council. A new election was held in June 2005, in which the seat was regained by the Labour candidate.

- In 2006, the BNP polled a total of 229,389 votes, having fielded 363 candidates in 78 local authorities across England. The party averaged 18% of the votes in wards contested. The BNP fielded 40 candidates in Birmingham, 25 in Sunderland, 23 in Kirklees and 22 in Leeds. 33 BNP councillors were elected; four lost their seats and the party gained a seat with the defection of a Conservative councillor in Lincolnshire bringing its total to 49.

The biggest gain in the local elections on 4 May 2006, was in Barking and Dagenham where the BNP gained 17% of the vote. The party also won three seats in Epping Forest, three in Stoke-on-Trent, three in Sandwell, two in Burnley, two in Kirklees, and single seats in Bradford, Havering, Solihull, Redditch, Redbridge, Pendle and Leeds. The same year, the BNP also gained its first parish councillor in Wales when Mike Howard of Rhewl Mostyn, Flintshire, previously an Independent, joined the BNP.

- In the 2007 local elections, the BNP polled 292,911 votes. It won 10 seats with a net gain of one. The party fielded a record of 744 candidates in 148 councils across England and Scotland. This was more than double the number of candidates fielded in 2006; they scored on average 13% of the votes in the wards which they contested.

In summary of BNP councillors from 2000 to 2007: from 2000 to 2001 the BNP had none, in 2002 it had three, by 2003 it had 16 local councillors, this increased to 21 by 2005, in 2006 the biggest gain saw BNP's councillors rise to 48, and by 2007 to 50.

In 2007, the number of BNP councillors fell slowly due to resignations and expulsions, several of them associated with a failed leadership challenge in the summer. By the end of the year, the number was 42. In 2008, however, the BNP increased its councillors to 55.

- In 2008, the BNP polled an average of 14% across 593 wards contested having fielded 612 candidates. The total number of votes polled by the BNP stood at 240,968. The party gained 15 seats and had 55 councillors in total.

The BNP did not field as many candidates for the 2009 local elections, because of its focus on the European Parliament election the same year, but for the first time won representation at county council level, winning three such seats. A seat in a local by-election in Sevenoaks district, Kent, was also won by the BNP.

About four BNP councillors resigned at the end of 2009, leaving the party with 54 councillors by 2010. In the May 2010 local elections, 26 BNP councillors lost their seats, leaving the party with 28 seats overall. In Barking and Dagenham, the party lost all 12 seats won in 2006.

- In the 2011 local elections, the BNP fielded 268 candidates and defended 13 council seats. It lost 11 of these seats, including all 5 of their councillors in Stoke-on-Trent. Two councillors were re-elected, one in Queensbury, West Yorkshire, and the other in Charnwood, Leicestershire, but no new seats were gained.
- In the 2011 Northern Ireland local elections, the party fielded 4 candidates; two in Larne and one each in Castlereagh and Newtownabbey. They received a total 491 votes, 0.1% of the total, and gained no council seats.

Between the 2011 and 2012 elections, the BNP lost a number of councillors to resignations, such as in Nuneaton and Bedworth and Amber Valley. This left them with 8 councillors in the run-up to the 2012 election.

In the 2012 local elections, the BNP polled an average of 9% across 59 council wards, and lost all 6 seats that it was defending in that election. They were left with 2 seats in areas without contests.

In the 2013 elections, the BNP fielded 99 candidates and was defending one seat in Lancashire. The party lost its only county council seat and did not gain any others, leaving it with just 2 borough seats in Charnwood and Pendle.

In 2014, the party retained its seat in Pendle, winning by just 6 votes. In the London local elections, the party ran 32 candidates- six in Enfield, five in Croydon and Greenwich, four in Barking and Dagenham, three in Bexley, two in Bromley, Ealing, Havering and Hillingdon, and one in Kingston upon Thames. Their most successful candidate was Kevin Layzell in Havering, who received 556 votes. Overall, the party received 8,222 votes, 0.3%, and no candidate was elected. Elsewhere. the party ran a total of 61 candidates; 41 in metropolitan boroughs (thirteen in Coventry City Council, seven in Stockport, five in Salford, three in St Helens and Birmingham, two each in Manchester, Tameside and Wolverhampton, and one each in Bolton, Dudley, Walsall and Wigan), 2 in unitary authorities (both in Derby) and 18 in non-metropolitan districts (eight in Worcestershire, three in Nuneaton and Bedworth, two each in Amber Valley, Burnley and Pendle, and one in Exeter). Their best performance was in Stockport, where Paul Bennett received 419 votes. The party received 8,505 votes overall and did not win any new seats, but successfully defended their seat in Pendle.

- In the 2014 Northern Ireland local elections, the BNP nominated 2 candidates, both in the Coast Road electoral area of Mid and East Antrim. They received a total of 173 votes, 3.2% of the total for that electoral area, and neither were elected.

In 2015, the BNP sought re-election to their Charnwood seat. Incumbent councillor Catherine Ann Marie Duffy was defeated by 185 votes. Nationally, 16 BNP candidates stood for election; 3 in metropolitan boroughs (two in Salford, one in Manchester), 1 in unitary authorities (Derby) and 12 in non-metropolitan districts (four in Worcester City, two in Northampton, and one each in Charnwood, East Northamptonshire, Maldon, Burnley, Exeter and Pendle). The party received 2,074 votes, their best result being the seat they were defending in Charnwood. They gained no new seats and lost the one they were defending.

In the 2016 elections, the party fielded two candidates in Burnley, and one each in Barnsley, Tameside, Havant and Pendle. They received a combined total of 1,005 votes, and none were elected.

In the 2017 local elections, the BNP ran seven candidates; five in Essex (two in Pitsea, one in Halstead, one in Maldon and one in Heybridge & Tollesbury), one in Hampshire (Hayling Island) and one in Lincolnshire (Louth South). They received a combined total of 923 votes and none of them were elected.

The last remaining BNP councilor, Brian Parker of Pendle, did not run for re-election in 2018. Since no other candidates were elected, this marked the first time since 2002 that the party had no elected representation. Nationally, the party focused on that year's London local elections. It ran fifteen candidates overall; five in Bexley, three in Croydon, two in Barking and Dagenham, and one each in Ealing, Greenwich, Havering, Hillingdon and Lewisham. Their best single candidate performance was in Bexley, where Michael Jones received 398 votes. Overall, the party received a combined total of 2,329 votes, 0.1% of the total, and no candidate was elected. Elsewhere, the party only fielded one candidate, in Exeter, who received 34 votes and was not elected.

The BNP ran just two candidates in the 2019 local elections, one in Sevenoaks and one in Broxbourne. They received a combined total of 317 votes and neither were elected.

The party ran 2 candidates in the 2021 local elections; one in a by-election for Croydon and one in West Northamptonshire. They received a combined total of 147 votes and neither were elected.

== European Parliament ==
The 1999 European elections were the first time European elections contested by the BNP which qualified for a party electoral broadcast after standing in every region except Wales. With regional votes of between 0.4% and 1.7% (1.13% nationally), it failed to win any seats and lost all its deposits.

In the 2004 European elections, the BNP vote increased by 3.9%, saving deposits in every region except Scotland. No seats were taken.

In the 2009 European elections, the BNP won two seats. Andrew Brons was elected in the Yorkshire and the Humber with 9.8% of the vote and Nick Griffin in North West England, with 8% of the vote. Nationally, the BNP received 6.26%.

In the 2014 European elections, the BNP's share of the vote collapsed nationally to 1.1%. Brons had already left the BNP to set up the British Democratic Party and did not stand. Griffin failed to be re-elected.

They did not run any candidates in the 2019 European elections.

=== 1999 European elections ===
Regional lists	Votes	%	+/- %	MEPs
East Midlands	9,342	1.3	n/a	0
East of England	9,356	0.9	n/a	0
London	17,960	1.6	n/a	0
North East England	3,505	0.9	n/a	0
North West England	13,587	1.3	n/a	0
Scotland	3,729	0.4	n/a	0
South East England	12,161	0.8	n/a	0
South West England	9,752	0.9	n/a	0
West Midlands	14,344	1.7	n/a	0
Yorkshire and the Humber	8,911	1.2	n/a	0
Total	102,647	1.13	n/a	0

=== 2004 European elections ===
Regional lists	Votes	%	+/- %	MEPs
East Midlands	91,860	6.5	+5.2	0
East of England	65,557	4.3	+3.4	0
London	76,152	4.0	+2.5	0
North East England	50,249	6.4	+5.5	0
North West England	134,959	6.4	+5.1	0
Scotland	19,427	1.7	+1.3	0
South East England	64,877	2.9	+2.1	0
South West England	43,653	3.0	+2.1	0
Wales	27,135	2.9	n/a	0
West Midlands	107,794	7.5	+5.8	0
Yorkshire and the Humber	126,538	8.0	+6.8	0
Total	808,200	4.9	+3.9	0

=== 2009 European elections ===
Regional lists	Votes	%	+/- %	MEPs
East Midlands	106,319	8.7	+2.1	0
East of England	97,013	6.1	+1.7	0
London	86,420	4.9	+0.9	0
North East England	52,700	8.9	+2.5	0
North West England	132,194	8.0	+1.6	1
Scotland	27,174	2.5	+0.8	0
South East England	101,769	4.4	+1.4	0
South West England	60,889	3.9	+0.9	0
Wales	37,114	5.4	+2.5	0
West Midlands	121,967	8.6	+1.1	0
Yorkshire and the Humber	120,139	9.8	+1.8	1
Total	943,598	6.2	+1.3	2

=== 2014 European elections ===
Regional lists	Votes	%	+/- %	MEPs
East Midlands	18,326	1.6	−7.0	0
East of England	12,465	0.8	−5.3	0
London	19,246	0.9	−4.1	0
North East England	10,360	1.7	−7.2	0
North West England	32,826	1.9	−6.1	−1
Scotland	10,216	0.8	−1.7	0
South East England	16,909	0.7	−3.6	0
South West England	10,910	0.7	−3.2	0
Wales	7,655	1.0	−4.4	0
West Midlands	20,643	1.5	−7.1	0
Yorkshire and the Humber	20,138	1.6	−8.2	0
Total	179,694	1.1	-5.1	0

== Scottish Parliament ==
In UK parliamentary elections, the BNP had only ever contested six Scottish seats – Clydesdale (1992 and 1997), Edinburgh West (1992), Glasgow Central (2005), Glasgow Govan (1997), Glasgow North East (2005, 2009 by election) and Glasgow Shettleston (1983 and 1997) – until the 2010 General election, when it contested 13 which covered all Glasgow constituencies and parts of the north-east but failed to save any deposits.

In the 2003 Scottish Parliament election, the BNP only stood one candidate, Peter Appleby, in the Glasgow electoral region; he polled 2,344 votes (1.1%), 0.001% of the nationwide vote.

In the 2007 Scottish Parliament election the BNP competed in all the Scottish Parliamentary electoral regions, polling 1.2% of the vote (seventh place). It failed to save any of its deposits.

In the 2011 Scottish Parliament election the BNP fielded 32 candidates – four in each of the eight electoral regions. It gained 15,580 votes (0.78%) throughout Scotland ending in 11th place. The party lost all deposits in all regions with no elected members and its nationwide vote fell by 0.42%, being beaten by UKIP, the Scottish Senior Citizens Unity Party, the Scottish Christian Party and the Socialist Labour Party.

They did not run any candidates in the 2016 Scottish Parliament election.

=== Scottish Parliament election (3 May 2007) ===
Regional lists	Votes	%	+/- %
Central Scotland	4,125	1.4	n/a
Glasgow	3,865	1.9	+0.8
Highlands and Islands	2,152	1.2	n/a
Lothians	2,637	0.9	n/a
Mid Scotland and Fife	2,620	1.0	n/a
North East Scotland	2,764	1.1	n/a
South of Scotland	3,212	1.2	n/a
West of Scotland	3,241	1.2	n/a
Total	24,616	1.2	+1.2

Source: BBC News

=== Scottish Parliament election (5 May 2011) ===
Regional lists	Votes	%	+/- %
Central Scotland	2,214	0.9	−0.5
Glasgow	2,424	1.2	−0.7
Highlands and Islands	1,134	0.6	−0.5
Lothian	1,978	0.7	−0.2
Mid Scotland and Fife	1,726	0.7	−0.3
North East Scotland	1,925	0.7	−0.3
South Scotland	2,017	0.7	−0.4
West Scotland	2,162	0.8	−0.5
Total	15,580	0.78	-0.42

Source: BBC News

== National Assembly for Wales/Senedd ==
In the 2003 Assembly election, the BNP only stood one candidate, Pauline Gregory, in the South Wales East region, who obtained 3,210 votes (1.89%) (less than 0.01% of the total).

In the 2007 Assembly election, it stood 20 candidates with all 4 for each region, they finished 6th nationwide with 42,197 votes (4.3%). The Welsh nationalist party Plaid Cymru came second to the Labour Party. The Liberal Democrats came fourth having achieved 2.5 times the vote of the BNP and earning six seats. The BNP was the only minor party to save its deposits in the electoral regions with one in the North Wales region and the other in the South Wales West region.

In the 2011 election, the BNP stood 27 candidates – 7 for the constituencies and 20 for the additional regions in which there would be 4 candidates for each of the 5 regions. Two candidates, in Swansea East and Islwyn, respectively, saved their deposits for the first time ever in a Welsh Assembly constituency. Despite its hope to win an Assembly seat, the BNP's nationwide vote in the regions fell by 1.9% from 4.3% which it gained in the 2007 Assembly elections to 2.6% losing all regional deposits and being beaten by the Greens, the UKIP and even the Socialist Labour Party.

They did not run any candidates in the elections of 2016 or 2021.

=== Welsh Assembly election (3 May 2007) ===
Regional lists	Votes	%	+/- %
Mid and West Wales	6,389	2.9	n/a
North Wales	9,986	5.1	n/a
South Wales Central	7,899	3.8	n/a
South Wales East	8,940	4.7	+2.8
South Wales West	8,993	5.5	n/a
Total	42,197	4.3	+4.29

Source: BBC News

=== Welsh Assembly election (5 May 2011) ===
Constituency	Candidate	Votes	%
Alyn and Deeside	Michael Joseph Whitby	959	4.2
Blaenau Gwent	Brian Urch	948	4.7
Caerphilly	Anthony King	1,022	4.0
Islwyn	Peter Whalley	1,115	5.3
Neath	Michael Green	1,004	4.2
Swansea East	Joanne Shannon	1,102	5.8
Torfaen	Sue Harwood	906	4.1
	Total	7,056	0.7

Regional lists	Votes	%	+/- %
Mid and West Wales	2,821	1.3	−1.6
North Wales	4,705	2.5	−2.6
South Wales Central	3,805	1.8	−2.0
South Wales East	6,485	3.6	−1.1
South Wales West	4,714	3.1	−2.5
Total	22,610	2.4	-1.9

Source: BBC News

== Northern Ireland Legislative Assembly ==
=== Northern Ireland Legislative Assembly election, (5 May 2011) ===
The BNP stood 3 candidates for the Northern Ireland Legislative Assembly elections for the first time. They did not run any in the 2016 or 2017 Assembly elections.

Constituency	Candidate	1st Pref	Result	Counts	%	+/- %
Belfast East	Ann Cooper	337	Eliminated	5	1.0	n/a
East Antrim	Steven Moore	511	Eliminated	2	1.8	n/a
South Antrim	Stephen Parkes	404	Eliminated	1	1.3	n/a
	Total	1,252			0.2	n/a

Source: BBC News

== See also ==
- National Front (UK) election results
