= John Morse (British politician) =

British politician (born 1951)

John Morse (born 1951) is a British political activist involved with the far-right. He was a leading figure in the British National Party under John Tyndall, serving alongside Richard Edmonds as Tyndall's closest ally in the party.

His alliance with Tyndall began when Morse supported his leadership of the National Front and continued when he was a founder of the New National Front. In the BNP, Morse served as editor of the party newspaper British Nationalist. Tyndall and Morse were imprisoned in 1986 for publishing material relating to racial hatred for a year, although the two men only served four months. In 1994 Morse and Edmonds were both charged with causing violent disorder after a black man was struck with a glass in Bethnal Green.

Based in Winchester, he served as the BNP's Mid-South organiser but resigned from the position in 1999 when Tyndall was replaced as party chairman by Nick Griffin.

Morse was expelled from the BNP in 2002 and, although he was later reinstated, he is no longer involved in the party.

Apart from his political activities, Morse worked as a bus driver.

== Elections contested ==
UK General elections

Date of election	Constituency	Party	Votes	%
1983	Bournemouth West	BNP	180	0.4
1992	Cardiff North	BNP	121	0.3
1997	Bournemouth West	BNP	165	0.4

European Parliament elections

Year	Region	Party	Votes	%	Result	Notes
1999	East of England	BNP	9,356	0.9	Not elected	Multi member constituencies; party list
