= Charles Parker (British politician) =

English businessman and British National Party former member

Charles Parker was a leading member of the British National Party in its early years and provided the group with much of its funding.

A businessman in Brighton, Parker and his wife joined the National Front (NF) in 1975. He soon took charge of the Sussex branch of the party, a position he continued to hold until he joined the BNP, despite having to see off a challenge to his authority from Martin Wingfield.

Parker's daughter Valerie married NF Chairman John Tyndall, who was also based in the Sussex area, in 1977 and as a result Parker became closely associated with Tyndall over the next number of years. Following Tyndall out of the NF in 1980 he became a leading member of the New National Front and provided the financial backing that enabled the fledgling movement to gain a foothold. He took a major role in the attempts to reach out to other groups that the NNF initiated in the early 1980s and on 7 April 1982 he joined Tyndall, Ray Hill of the British Movement, Capt. Kenneth McKilliam, the founder of the NF's ex-servicemen's organisation and John Peacock of the British Democratic Party at a press conference in a hotel in Victoria, London to announce the foundation of the new BNP.

Parker became a leading figure within the BNP, continuing as head of the new group in Sussex, as well as providing much of the party's finances and acting as National Organiser. He also joined Hill in warning Tyndall against making any deals with the Official National Front, after one of its senior members, Joe Pearce, approached Tyndall about the possibility of an alliance. Advancing age meant that his role in the BNP diminished during the 1980s as he retired from politics.
