= Simon Darby =

British politician (born 1964)

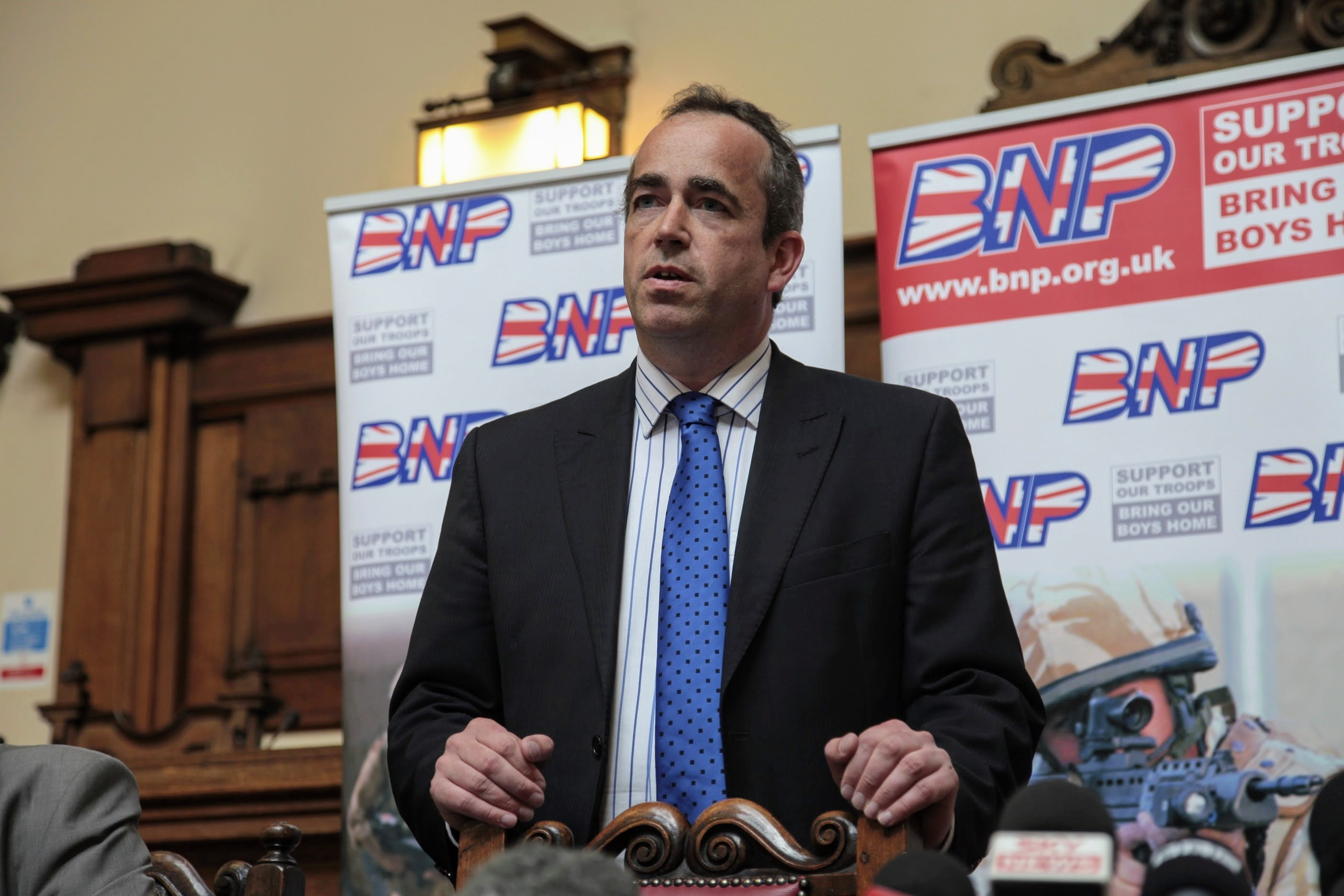
- Simon Darby at the BNP manifesto launch 23 April 2010

Deputy chairman of the British National Party
- In office 2007 – 1 July 2010
- Leader: Nick Griffin
- Preceded by: Scott McLean
- Succeeded by: Adam Walker

Councillor Dudley Metropolitan Borough Council Castle & Priory Ward
- In office 1 May 2003 – 10 June 2004
- Preceded by: Hall, Peter Robert
- Succeeded by: Finch, Joseph Alan
- Majority: 173 (7%)

Personal details
- Born: 8 November 1964 (age 61) West Bromwich, Staffordshire, England
- Party: British National Party

Simon Darby (born 8 November 1964) is a British politician and former deputy chairman of the British National Party.

== Background ==
By occupation a communications consultant, Darby began his political career in the National Democrats, most of whose activity was centred on his West Midlands base. Darby joined the BNP when his local National Democrat group defected to the party en bloc. He soon became associated with the modernising wing of the party led by Nick Griffin. He was appointed local organiser following Griffin's election as leader, and was courted for membership by the Freedom Party on its foundation, although he refused to leave the BNP.

Darby's involvement in local politics led to him being elected to Dudley Metropolitan Borough Council in 2003. He lost the seat in a round of elections the following year. Despite this loss, Darby remained one of the leading figures in the BNP, to the extent that Griffin, who in 2005-06 faced jail before being cleared of inciting racial hatred, designated Darby as party leader should he have been imprisoned.

Darby stood in the 2007 Welsh National Assembly Elections in the North Wales region but was not elected.

== Later party career ==
Newspaper reports identify Darby as the BNP's deputy leader in 2007. He became a personal assistant to Richard Barnbrook following the latter's election as the BNP's representative on the Greater London Authority in May 2008. In this capacity, in November 2008 Darby faced criticism after admitting carrying out BNP party political work from his office as Barnbrook's assistant at City Hall. Darby denied that he used GLA resources and said that he always made up any office hours spent on party activities. Darby is now the national press officer for the BNP.

In 2009, Darby was criticised after pictures showed a member of an Italian political rally giving a Fascist style salute while Darby spoke on stage. When asked about the incident, Darby responded, "I can't do anything about that. There were 500 people and three of them were caught doing that stupid behaviour." In May the same year, he clashed with Archbishop Dr John Sentamu who had condemned the BNP for labelling British citizens of African and Asian descent as "racial foreigners". Defending his comments, Darby insisted, "If I went there and preached down to those indigenous people in the same way that Sentamu does to us then I'd be attacked. If I was derogatory, condescending and arrogant - because that's what John Sentamu is - I would be attacked. And rightly so."

On 1 July 2010, Darby resigned his role as deputy chairman citing impartiality regarding the then forthcoming 2010 BNP leadership election challenge, writing on his blog, "I didn't really want to be drawn into the leadership question, however, it seems the inevitable has happened, with adversaries of Nick Griffin raising the issue of the position of Deputy Leader in general, and referring to me in particular. As you know, the position carries absolutely no constitutional weight, and I feel it totally unfair and underhand, in a potential contest that involves solely the leader of the party, that some are seeking to confuse matters by bringing up the position of Deputy." He continues to play a leading role as the party spokesman.

== Personal life ==
A keen angler and ornithologist, Darby has a BSc (Hons) in biology and chemistry.

== Elections contested ==
UK Parliament elections

Date of election	Constituency	Party	Votes	%
1997	Dudley North	NDs	469	1.0
2001	Dudley North	BNP	1,822	4.7
2005	Dudley North	BNP	4,022	9.7
2010	Stoke-on-Trent Central	BNP	2,502	7.7

Welsh Assembly elections (Additional members region; party list)

Date of election	Region	Party	Votes	Percentage of votes	Result
2007 Welsh Assembly election	North Wales	BNP	9,986	5.1	Not elected

European Parliament elections

Date of election	Constituency	Party	Votes	%	Notes
1996	Merseyside West	NDs	718	1.2	Single member constituencies

Year	Region	Party	Votes	%	Results	Notes
1999	West Midlands	BNP	14,344	1.7	Not elected	Multi member constituencies; party list
2004	West Midlands	BNP	107,794	7.5	Not elected	Multi member constituencies; party list
2009	West Midlands	BNP	121,967	8.6	Not elected	Multi member constituencies; party list
2014	North West England	BNP	32,826	1.9	Not elected	Multi member constituencies; party list
