= 2012 Croydon North by-election =

2012 UK Parliamentary by-election

- 29 November 2012

The Croydon North seat in the House of Commons
- Registered: 93,036
- Turnout: 26.5%
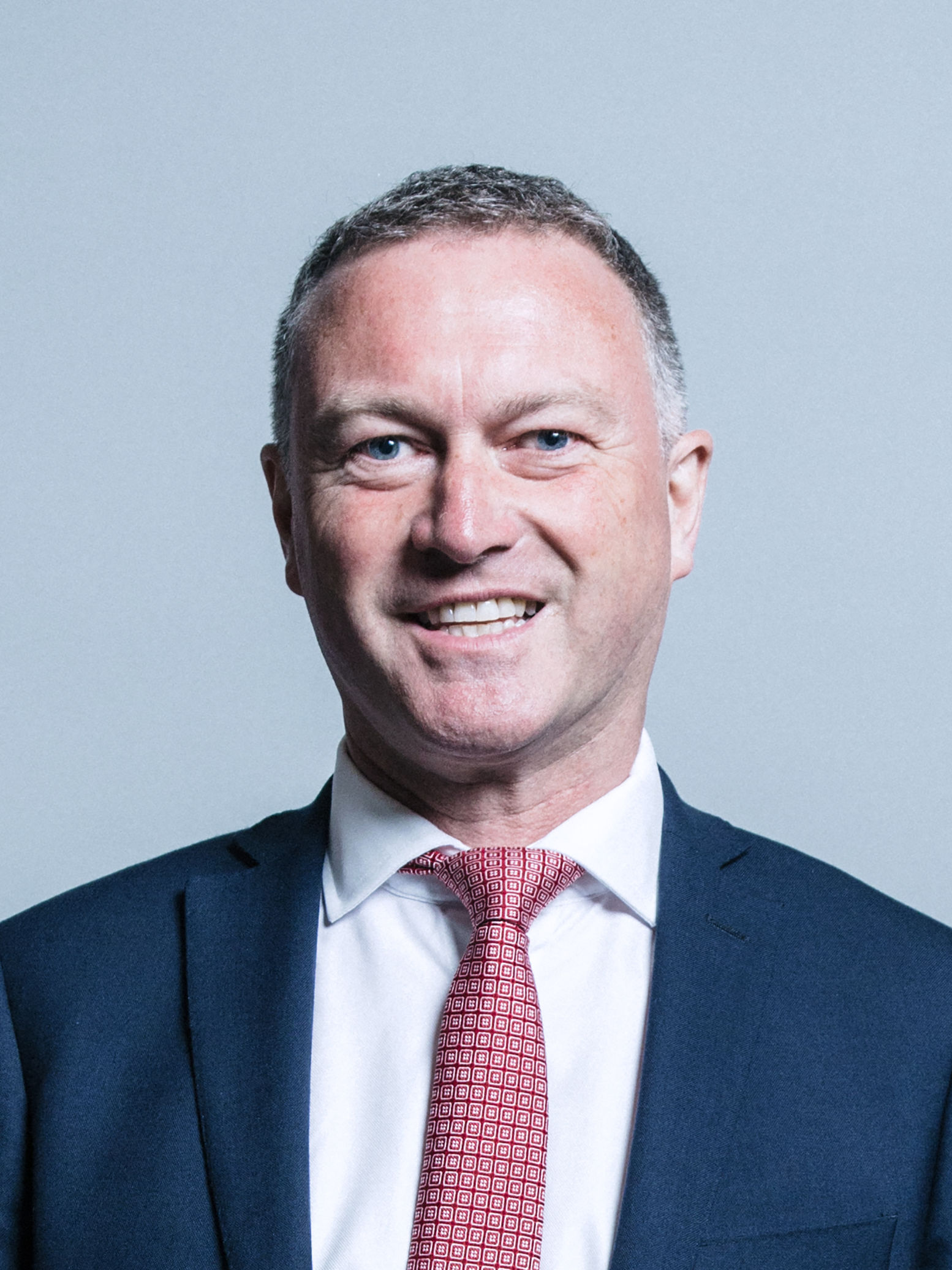

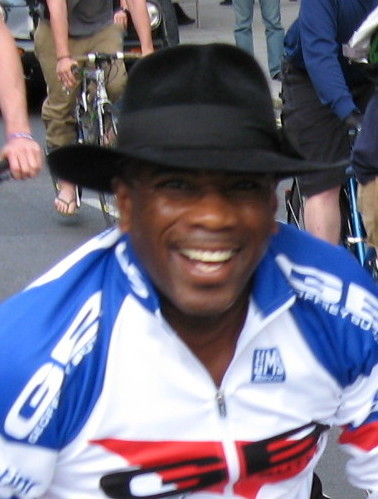
	First party	Second party	Third party
		Con
Candidate	Steve Reed	Andrew Stranack	Winston McKenzie
Party	Labour	Conservative	UKIP
Popular vote	15,898	4,137	1,400
Percentage	64.7%	16.8%	5.7%
Swing	▲8.7 pp	▼7.3 pp	▲4.0 pp
MP before election
Malcolm Wicks
Labour
Subsequent MP
Steve Reed
Labour

A by-election for the United Kingdom parliamentary constituency of Croydon North was held on 29 November 2012, caused by the death of incumbent Labour Party member of Parliament (MP) Malcolm Wicks. It was won by Steve Reed who held the seat for Labour.

Two other by-elections in Middlesbrough and Rotherham were held on the same day.

== Boundaries ==
The constituency covers the north west of the London Borough of Croydon and includes Thornton Heath, Norbury, Selhurst and parts of South and Upper Norwood. It is made up of eight electoral wards from the borough:

- Bensham Manor, Broad Green, Norbury, Selhurst, South Norwood, Thornton Heath, Upper Norwood, and West Thornton

Croydon's three constituencies are contiguous with the boundaries of the London Borough of Croydon. Croydon North borders the seats of Carshalton and Wallington, Mitcham and Morden, Streatham, Dulwich and West Norwood, Lewisham West and Penge, Beckenham, Croydon Central, and Croydon South.

== Result ==
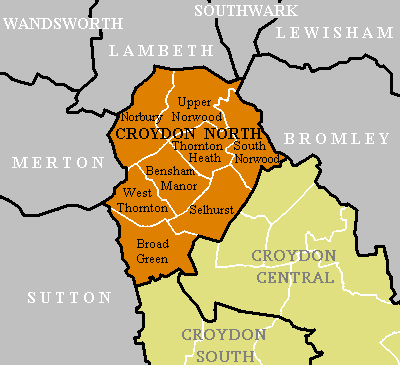
Wards of Croydon North constituency (orange) within the London Borough of Croydon (yellow)

Croydon Borough Council released the statement of persons nominated on 14 November. This confirmed 12 candidates would contest the election. The electorate was said to be around 104,000.

Charity worker and social entrepreneur Andrew Stranack, who has cerebral palsy, was the Conservative Party candidate.

On 17 October 2012, IT professional and former London Borough of Islington Councillor Marisha Ray was selected as the prospective Liberal Democrats candidate.

On 25 October, the Green Party chose local campaigner Shasha Khan, dubbed by local reporters as 'Croydon's Green Knight'.

Winston McKenzie, a perennial election candidate who stood for UKIP in Tottenham, was an independent candidate at the 2003 Brent East by-election, a Veritas Party nominee at Croydon North in 2005, and an independent candidate for London Mayor was chosen as the prospective candidate for the UK Independence Party.

On 29 October, the Chair of the London Race and Criminal Justice Consortium and a former Senior Policy Advisor to the then Mayor of London Ken Livingstone, Lee Jasper, was selected as the candidate for the Respect Party.

On 17 October, the National Front confirmed their prospective candidate to be the former British National Party Deputy Chairman and engineer Richard Edmonds.

On 3 November 2012, former children's book publisher and current Leader of London Borough of Lambeth Council, councillor Steve Reed was chosen to be the Labour candidate after a closely fought battle with London Assembly member Val Shawcross.

2012 Croydon North by-election
Party	Candidate	Votes	%	±%
Labour	Steve Reed	15,892	64.7	+8.7
Conservative	Andrew Stranack	4,137	16.8	−7.3
UKIP	Winston McKenzie	1,400	5.7	+4.0
Liberal Democrats	Marisha Ray	860	3.5	−10.5
Green	Shasha Khan	855	3.5	+1.5
Respect	Lee Jasper	707	2.9	+2.4
CPA	Stephen Hammond	192	0.8	New
National Front	Richard Edmonds	161	0.7	New
Communist	Ben Stevenson	119	0.5	+0.2
Monster Raving Loony	John Cartwright	110	0.4	New
Nine Eleven Was An Inside Job	Simon Lane	66	0.3	New
Young People's	Robin Smith	63	0.3	New
Majority		11,755	47.9	+16.0
Turnout		24,562	26.5	−34.1
Rejected ballots		112	0.1	N/A
Registered electors		93,036		
Labour hold		Swing	+8.0	

== Previous result ==
General election 2010: Croydon North
Party	Candidate	Votes	%	±%
Labour	Malcolm Wicks	28,947	56.0	+2.4
Conservative	Jason Hadden	12,466	24.1	+1.9
Liberal Democrats	Gerry Jerome	7,226	14.0	−3.2
Green	Shasha Khan	1,017	2.0	−0.9
UKIP	Jonathan Serter	891	1.7	0.0
Christian	Novlette Williams	586	1.1	New
Respect	Mohommad Shaikh	272	0.5	New
Communist	Ben Stevenson	160	0.3	New
Independent	Mohamed Seyed	111	0.2	New
Majority		16,481	31.9	+0.5
Turnout		51,676	60.6	+8.0
Registered electors		85,216		
Labour hold		Swing	+0.3	

== See also ==
- 1940 Croydon North by-election
- 1948 Croydon North by-election
- List of United Kingdom by-elections
- Opinion polling for the 2015 United Kingdom general election
