= Tom Holmes (British politician) =

British far-right politician (1930–2016)

Thomas Frank Holmes (31 October 1930 – August 2016) was a British far-right politician. He was the chairman of the National Front between 1998 and 2009, and was a long-standing member of the movement.

== Life and activism ==
Holmes was born in Great Yarmouth, Norfolk on 31 October 1930. He was involved in nationalist politics from 1958. Holmes later lived in Caister-on-Sea, a village near Yarmouth. He died there in August 2016, at the age of 85.

== Views ==
Holmes was a strong supporter of European nationalism and stated, "I have contacts with people all over Europe: Austria, Italy, France, Germany, Spain, Greece, Serbia, but none of these are official contacts, we have unofficial contacts, yes, we support any European nationalist party." He was also highly critical of the British National Party, claiming that it was no longer truly white nationalist and condemning it for having a Sikh columnist in the party's newspaper.

== General elections contested ==
Date of election	Constituency	Party	Votes	%
1979	Yarmouth	NF	640	1.2
2001	North Thanet	NF	395	0.9
2005	Halifax	NF	191	0.5
