= Richard Edmonds =

English far-right avtivist

Deputy chairman and national organiser of the British National Party
- In office 1982–1999
- Leader: John Tyndall
- Succeeded by: Sharron Edwards (as deputy chairman)

Chairman of the British National Party acting
- In office 1986
- Leader: John Tyndall

Personal details
- Born: 10 March 1943 Hounslow, Middlesex, England
- Died: 23 December 2020 (aged 77) Sutton, South London, England
- Party: National Front (1973–1980; 2011–2020); New National Front (1980–1982); British National Party (1982–2011)

Richard Charles Edmonds (10 March 1943 – 23 December 2020) was a British far-right politician and activist. He was the deputy chairman and national organiser of the British National Party (BNP) and also prominent in the National Front (NF) during two spells of membership.

== Early activities ==
Edmonds began his political career in 1972 as a member of the National Front (NF), holding a number of positions during John Tyndall's chairmanship of the party. In the October 1974 general election he was NF candidate at Deptford, polling 1,731 votes (4.5%). At this time, he was a mathematics teacher at Tulse Hill Comprehensive School. In his election address he said, "To young immigrants, Richard Edmonds says that they should study to the best of their abilities, for their duty and future lie in helping their compatriots to build up their own countries." He followed Tyndall into the New National Front in 1980 and was appointed head of the youth section, editing Young Nationalist magazine.

From 1982, Edmonds held senior positions within the newly formed British National Party (BNP), eventually becoming deputy leader and also acting leader for a spell in 1986 while Tyndall was in prison for incitement to racial hatred. Edmonds took a role in funding the party, including partially funding the purchase of a new party headquarters and bookshop in Welling. Edmonds ran the party's Welling premises, living in the premises, for ten years, from 1989 to 1999. In the 1992 election he gained a 3.6% share of the vote in Bethnal Green and Stepney, the party's best showing in that election.

== Criminal convictions, Holocaust denial and media coverage ==
Edmonds was a Holocaust denier. In 1988, The Sunday Times revealed that the Holocaust News, a publication that claimed the Holocaust was an "evil hoax", was being published by Edmonds, on behalf of a BNP front organisation, the Centre for Historical Review, and distributed by members. According to John Tyndall, after this interview took place Edmonds gave Jon Craig and Jo Revell, the two journalists covering the story, his business card telephone number in the strictest confidence. Subsequently, the published article contained the name of the company Edmonds worked for. Tyndall wrote that the next day Edmonds was told to leave. The theme was re-visited in Panorama on 8 April 1991, when Edmonds described the publication as "a wonderful statement of the truth".

In 1993, Edmonds and a group of BNP members were drinking outside a pub in Bethnal Green; when a black man and his white girlfriend tried to pass, the BNP crowd spat at them and shouted "nigger lover" and "monkey" at them. Edmonds threw a beer glass at them and his companions "glassed" the man's face and punched and kicked him. Edmonds was eventually sentenced to the time he had already spent in jail on remand. He also has a conviction for damaging a statue of Nelson Mandela on the South Bank in London. There was further controversy in 1993 when he told The Guardian's Duncan Campbell that "we [the BNP] are 100% racist". Edmonds had previously clarified his position to Panorama as "racism means long live the white race, long live the British race".

In 2005, Edmonds gave support to the British Holocaust denier David Irving when he was arrested for denying the Holocaust in Austria. Edmonds shouted to Irving, "Stay strong, stay strong, good luck to you." Edmonds told reporters that he was defending free speech.

== Nick Griffin's leadership of the BNP ==
Edmonds' held the position of national organiser until 1999 when he was forced to resign following the elevation of Nick Griffin in the leadership election that year. Edmonds remained Tyndall's closest ally but was not expelled from the party when Tyndall and another long-term ally, John Morse, were expelled in 2003, before being subsequently reinstated. Edmonds continued to write for Spearhead until it ceased publication on Tyndall's death in 2005. He is a long-term supporter of John Tyndall. Although he sometimes attended events sponsored by the Nationalist Alliance, Edmonds remained a member of the BNP, playing a leading role in its Croydon branch (which has been at times somewhat cool towards the national leadership).

Edmonds was co-opted by Griffin onto the BNP's Advisory Council in September 2008, thereby returning to the upper echelon of the party and ending his period of apparent dissidence. However, in August 2010, following Eddy Butler's unsuccessful leadership challenge, Edmonds was sacked from the Advisory Council due to his open criticism of Griffin's fundraiser, Jim Dowson, and to his support for the leadership bid by Butler.

Following the party's poor showing in the 2011 English local elections, Welsh Assembly and Scottish Parliamentary elections, Edmonds announced his candidature for the leadership of the BNP. According to The Guardian, Edmonds, a "BNP hardliner", had little chance of success, although at the time then MEP Andrew Brons was supporting Edmonds against Griffin. At the end of May 2011, Richard Edmonds stepped down from his challenge in favour of Brons.

== Rejoined the National Front ==
The NF in a report on its 2011 AGM, claimed that Edmonds had decided to rejoin the party. This was subsequently confirmed and he took up a role as an activist for the group. He was the party's candidate in the 2012 Croydon North by-election, finishing eighth out of twelve candidates with 161 votes (0.7% vote share) and in Carshalton and Wallington for the 2015 general election, receiving 49 votes (0.1%). He was the NF's candidate in the Batley and Spen by-election, held on 20 October 2016, following the murder of the MP Jo Cox. Edmonds gained 87 votes (0.43%).

== Death ==
Edmonds died at his home in Sutton, South London, on 23 December 2020, at the age of 77. He had been suffering from a serious heart condition for several years before his death.

== Elections contested ==
=== UK Parliament elections ===
Date of election	Constituency	Party	Votes	%
October 1974	Lewisham, Deptford	NF	1,731	4.8
1983	Lewisham, East	BNP	288	0.7
1992	Bethnal Green & Stepney	BNP	1,310	3.6
November 2012 by-election	Croydon North	NF	161	0.7
2015	Carshalton and Wallington	NF	49	0.1
October 2016 by-election	Batley and Spen	NF	87	0.4

=== Greater London Council elections ===
Date of election	Constituency	Party	Votes	%
1977	Deptford	NF	1,463	7.2
1981	Deptford	NNF	487	2.0

=== London Assembly elections ===
Date of election	Constituency	Party	Votes	%
2012	Havering and Redbridge	NF	1,936	1.4
2016	Croydon and Sutton	NF	1,106	0.6

== Bibliography ==
- N. Copsey, Contemporary British Fascism: The British National Party and the Quest for Legitimacy, Basingstoke: Palgrave Macmillan, 2004
- John Tyndall, The Eleventh Hour, Welling: Albion Press, 1998
