= Battle of the Bagradas River (255 BC) =

Battle of the First Punic War

- Part of the First Punic War
- The campaign in North Africa of which this battle was a part; the approximate location of the battle is shown by "5".
Date	Spring 255 BC
Location	Medjerda River near Tunis 36.7975°N 10.1659°E
Result	Carthaginian victory: Marcus Atilius Regulus captured

Belligerents
Carthage	Rome

Commanders and leaders
Xanthippus	Marcus Atilius Regulus (POW)

Strength
16,000 12,000 infantry 4,000 cavalry 100 elephants	15,500 15,000 infantry 500 cavalry

Casualties and losses
At least 800 killed	13,500 13,000 killed 500 captured

The Battle of the Bagradas River (the ancient name of the Medjerda), also known as the Battle of Tunis, was a victory by a Carthaginian army led by Xanthippus over a Roman army led by Marcus Atilius Regulus in the spring of 255 BC, nine years into the First Punic War. The previous year, the newly constructed Roman navy established naval superiority over Carthage. The Romans used this advantage to invade Carthage's homeland, which roughly aligned with modern-day Tunisia in North Africa. After landing on the Cape Bon Peninsula and conducting a successful campaign, the fleet returned to Sicily, leaving Regulus with 15,500 men to hold the lodgement in Africa over the winter.

Instead of holding his position, Regulus advanced towards the city of Carthage and defeated the Carthaginian army at the Battle of Adys. The Romans followed up and captured Tunis, only 16 kilometres (10 mi) from Carthage. Despairing, the Carthaginians sued for peace, but Regulus's proposed terms were so harsh the Carthaginians decided to fight on. They gave charge of the training of their army, and eventually operational control, to the Spartan mercenary general Xanthippus.

In the spring of 255 BC, Xanthippus led an army strong in cavalry and elephants against the Romans' infantry-based force. The Romans had no effective answer to the elephants. Their outnumbered cavalry were chased from the field and the Carthaginian cavalry then surrounded most of the Romans and wiped them out; 500 survived and were captured, including Regulus. A force of 2,000 Romans avoided being surrounded and retreated to Aspis. The war continued for another 14 years, mostly on Sicily or in nearby waters, before ending with a Roman victory; the terms offered to Carthage were more generous than those proposed by Regulus.

== Primary sources ==
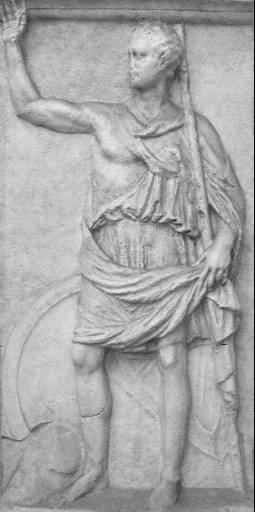
Polybius – "a remarkably well-informed, industrious, and insightful historian"

The main source for almost every aspect of the First Punic War (Note: The term Punic comes from the Latin word Punicus (or Poenicus), meaning "Carthaginian", and is a reference to the Carthaginians' Phoenician ancestry.) is the historian Polybius (c. 200 – c. 118 BC), a Greek sent to Rome in 167 BC as a hostage. His works include a now lost manual on military tactics, but he is best known for his The Histories, written sometime after 167 BC, or about a century after the Battle of the Bagradas River. Polybius's work is considered broadly objective and largely neutral as between Carthaginian and Roman points of view.

Carthaginian written records were destroyed along with their capital, Carthage, in 146 BC and so Polybius's account of the First Punic War is based on several, now-lost, Greek and Latin sources. Polybius was an analytical historian and wherever possible personally interviewed participants in the events he wrote about. Only the first book of the forty comprising The Histories deals with the First Punic War. The accuracy of Polybius's account has been much debated over the past 150 years, but the modern consensus is to accept it largely at face value, and the details of the battle in modern sources are almost entirely based on interpretations of Polybius's account. He was on the staff of Scipio Aemilianus when Scipio led a Roman army during the Third Punic War on a campaign through many of the locations which featured in the events of 256–255 BC. The modern historian Andrew Curry considers that "Polybius turns out to [be] fairly reliable"; while the classicist Dexter Hoyos describes him as "a remarkably well-informed, industrious, and insightful historian". Other, later, histories of the war exist, but in fragmentary or summary form, and they usually cover military operations on land in more detail than those at sea. Modern historians usually also take into account the later histories of Diodorus Siculus and Dio Cassius, although the classicist Adrian Goldsworthy states that "Polybius' account is usually to be preferred when it differs with any of our other accounts." (Note: Sources other than Polybius are discussed by Bernard Mineo in "Principal Literary Sources for the Punic Wars (apart from Polybius)".) Other sources include inscriptions, coins, archaeological evidence and empirical evidence from reconstructions such as the trireme Olympias.

== Background ==
In 264 BC the states of Carthage and Rome went to war, starting the First Punic War. Carthage was a well-established maritime power in the Western Mediterranean; Rome had recently unified mainland Italy south of the Arno River under its control. Rome's expansion into southern Italy probably made it inevitable that it would eventually clash with Carthage over Sicily on some pretext. The immediate cause of the war was the issue of control of the Sicilian town of Messana (modern Messina).

By 256 BC the war had grown into a struggle in which the Romans were attempting to decisively defeat the Carthaginians and, at a minimum, control the whole of Sicily. The Carthaginians were engaging in their traditional policy of waiting for their opponents to wear themselves out, in the expectation of then regaining some or all of their possessions and negotiating a mutually satisfactory peace treaty. The Romans were essentially a land-based power and had gained control of most of Sicily. The war there had reached a stalemate, as the Carthaginians focused on defending their well-fortified towns and cities; these were mostly on the coast and so could be supplied and reinforced without the Romans being able to use their superior army to interfere.

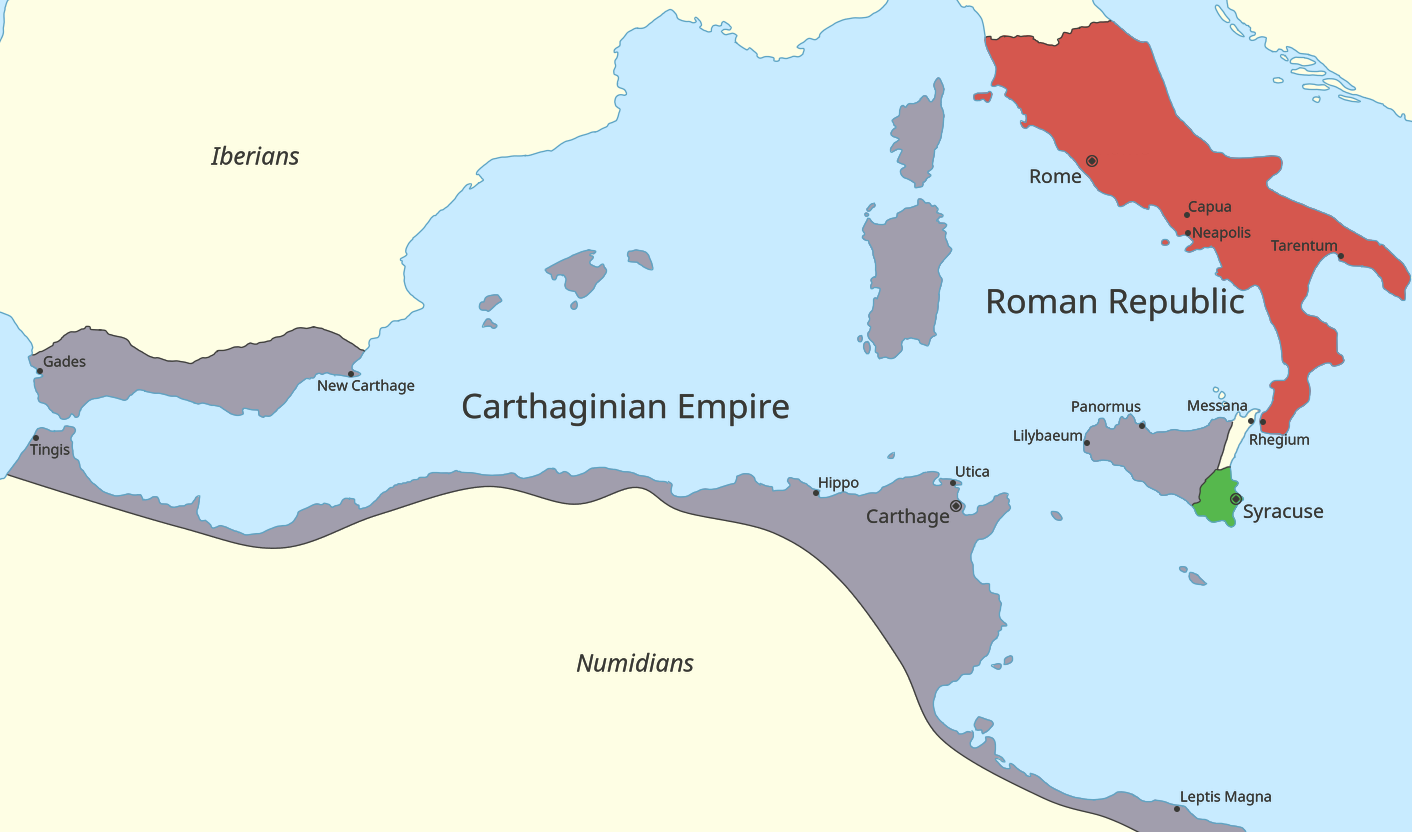
Territory controlled by Rome and Carthage at the start of the First Punic War

The focus of the war shifted to the sea, where the Romans had little experience; on the few occasions they had previously felt the need for a naval presence they relied on small squadrons provided by their allies. In 260 BC Romans set out to construct a fleet using a shipwrecked Carthaginian quinquereme as a blueprint for their own ships. Frustration at the continuing stalemate in the land war on Sicily, combined with naval victories at Mylae (260 BC) and Sulci (258 BC), led the Romans to develop a plan to invade the Carthaginian heartland in North Africa and threaten their capital (close to what is now Tunis). Both sides were determined to establish naval supremacy and invested large amounts of money and manpower in maintaining and increasing the size of their navies.

It was the long-standing Roman procedure to appoint two men each year, known as consuls, to each lead an army. The Roman fleet of 330 warships plus an unknown number of transports sailed from Ostia, the port of Rome, in early 256 BC, jointly commanded by both consuls for the year, Marcus Atilius Regulus and Lucius Manlius Vulso Longus. They embarked approximately 26,000 legionaries from the Roman forces on Sicily. The Carthaginians were aware of the Romans' intentions and mustered all available warships, 350, under Hanno and Hamilcar, off the south coast of Sicily to intercept them. With a combined total of about 680 warships carrying as many as 290,000 crew and marines, the battle was possibly the largest naval battle in history by the number of combatants involved. When they met at the Battle of Cape Ecnomus, the Carthaginians took the initiative, hoping their superior ship-handling skills would be decisive. After a prolonged and confused day of fighting the Carthaginians were defeated, losing 30 ships sunk and 64 captured to Roman losses of 24 ships sunk.

== Prelude ==
1: Romans land and capture Aspis (256 BC) 2: Roman victory at Adys (256 BC) 3: Romans capture Tunis (256 BC) 4: Xanthippus sets out from Carthage with a large army (255 BC) 5: Romans are defeated at the Battle of the Bagradas River. (255 BC) 6: Romans retreat to Aspis and leave Africa. (255 BC)

As a result of the battle, the Roman army, commanded by Regulus and Longus, landed in Africa near Aspis (modern Kelibia) on the Cape Bon Peninsula and began ravaging the Carthaginian countryside for supplies to feed their 90,000 rowers and crew, and 26,000 legionaries. They captured 20,000 slaves, vast herds of cattle and, after a brief siege, the city of Aspis. The Roman Senate sent orders for most of the Roman ships and a large part of the army to return to Sicily under Longus, probably due to the logistical difficulties of supplying more than 100,000 men over the winter. Regulus was left with 40 ships, 15,000 infantry and 500 cavalry to overwinter in Africa. Regulus was an experienced military commander, having been consul in 267 BC, when he was awarded a triumph for his victory against the Salentini. (Note: Quintus Caedicius was elected consul for the year alongside Longus; he died after taking office but before the fleet sailed. Regulus was appointed to replace him.) His orders were to weaken the Carthaginian army pending reinforcement in the spring. It was expected he would achieve this by raids and by fomenting rebellion among Carthage's subject territories, but consuls had wide discretion. Regulus chose to take his relatively small force and strike inland. He advanced on the city of Adys, 60 kilometres (40 mi) south-east of Carthage, and besieged it. The Carthaginians, meanwhile, had recalled Hamilcar from Sicily with 5,000 infantry and 500 cavalry. Hamilcar and two previously unknown generals named Hasdrubal and Bostar were placed in joint command of an army which was strong in cavalry and elephants and was approximately the same size as the Roman force.

The Carthaginians established a camp on a hill near Adys. The Romans carried out a night march and launched a surprise dawn attack on the camp from two directions. After confused fighting the Carthaginians broke and fled. Their losses are unknown, although their elephants and cavalry escaped with few casualties. The Romans followed up and captured numerous towns, including Tunis, only 16 km (10 mi) from Carthage. From Tunis the Romans raided and devastated the immediate area around Carthage. Many of Carthage's African possessions took the opportunity to rise in revolt. The city of Carthage was packed with refugees fleeing Regulus or the rebels, and food ran out. In despair, according to most ancient sources, the Carthaginians sued for peace. Polybius differs in stating that Regulus initiated the negotiations, hoping to receive the glory of ending the war before his successors arrived to replace him. In either case Regulus, within sight of what he took to be a thoroughly defeated Carthage, demanded harsh terms: Carthage was to hand over Sicily, Sardinia and Corsica; pay all of Rome's war expenses; pay tribute to Rome each year; be prohibited from declaring war or making peace without Roman permission; have its navy limited to a single warship; but provide 50 large warships to the Romans on their request. Finding these completely unacceptable, the Carthaginians decided to fight on. (Note: The historian Frank Walbank believes that these terms, given by Cassius Dio, are invented.)

== Armies ==
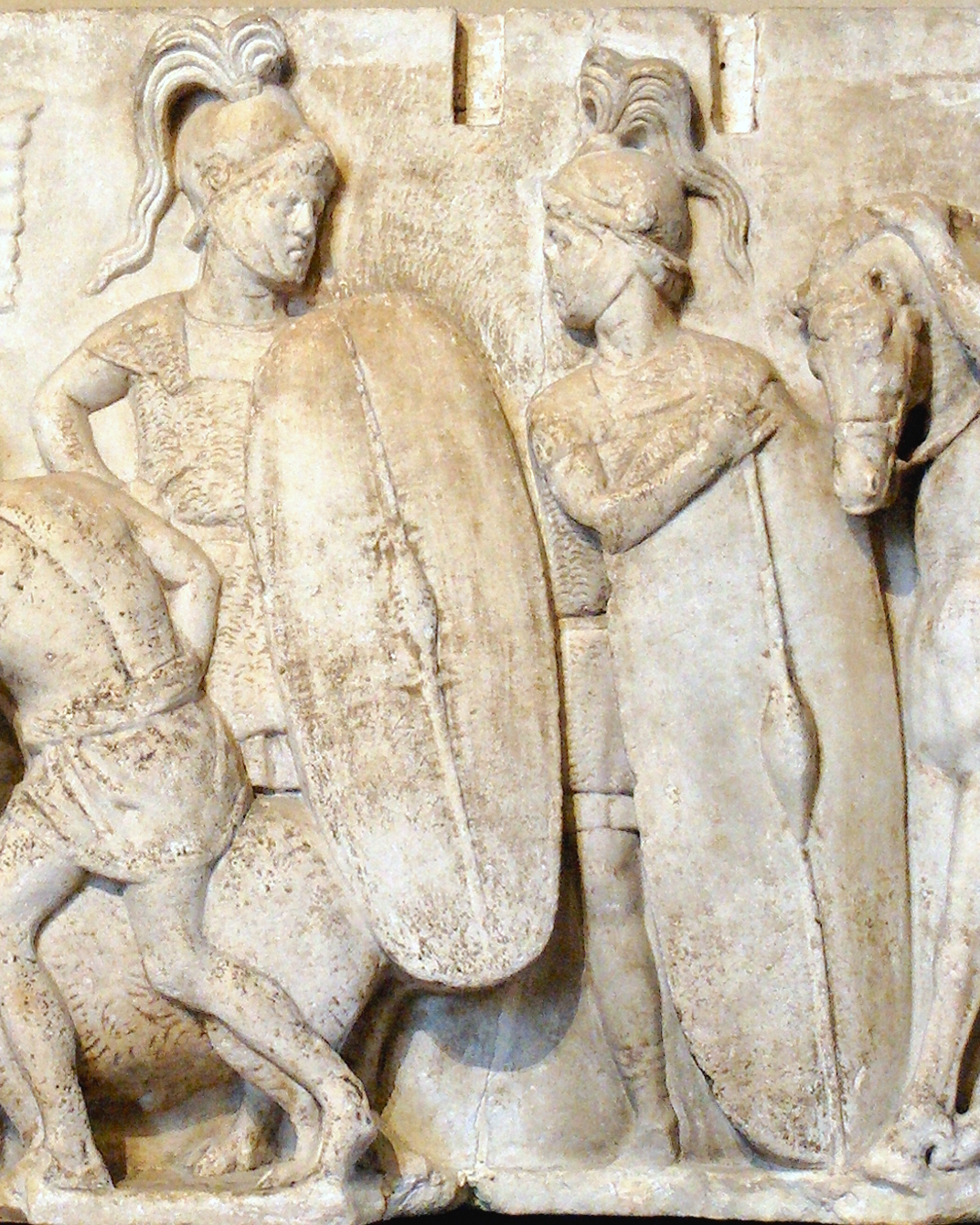
Detail from the Ahenobarbus relief showing two Roman foot-soldiers from the second century BC

Most male Roman citizens were liable for military service and would serve as infantry, a better-off minority providing a cavalry component. Traditionally, when at war the Romans would raise two legions, each of 4,200 infantry (Note: This could be increased to 5,000 in some circumstances.) and 300 cavalry. A few infantry served as javelin-armed skirmishers. The balance were equipped as heavy infantry, with body armour, a large shield and short thrusting swords. They were divided into three ranks, of which the front rank also carried two javelins, while the second and third ranks had a thrusting spear instead. Both legionary sub-units and individual legionaries fought in relatively open order. An army was usually formed by combining a Roman legion with a similarly sized and equipped legion provided by their Latin allies. It is not clear how the 15,000 infantry at the Bagradas River were constituted, but they possibly represented four slightly under-strength legions: two Roman and two allied. Regulus did not attract any troops from the towns and cities rebelling against Carthage. In this he differed from other generals, including Roman ones, leading armies against Carthage in Africa. The reasons for this are not known. In particular, the difficulty in transporting horses had restricted his cavalry force to only 500, and his failure to make up this deficiency is puzzling.

Carthaginian citizens served in their army only if there was a direct threat to the city. When they did they fought as well-armoured heavy infantry armed with long thrusting spears, although they were notoriously ill-trained and ill-disciplined. In most circumstances Carthage recruited foreigners to make up its army. Many would be from North Africa which provided several types of fighters including: close-order infantry equipped with large shields, helmets, short swords and long thrusting spears; javelin-armed light infantry skirmishers; close-order shock cavalry carrying spears; and light cavalry skirmishers who threw javelins from a distance and avoided close combat. Both Spain and Gaul provided small numbers of experienced infantry; unarmoured troops who would charge ferociously, but had a reputation for breaking off if a combat was protracted. (Note: The Spanish used a heavy throwing spear which the Romans were later to adopt as the pilum.) The close order Libyan infantry and the citizen-militia would fight in a tightly packed formation known as a phalanx. Slingers were frequently recruited from the Balearic Islands, although it is not clear if any were present at Tunis. The Carthaginians also employed war elephants; North Africa had indigenous African forest elephants at the time. (Note: These elephants were typically about 2.5-metre-high (8 ft) at the shoulder, and should not be confused with the larger African bush elephant.)

== Xanthippus ==
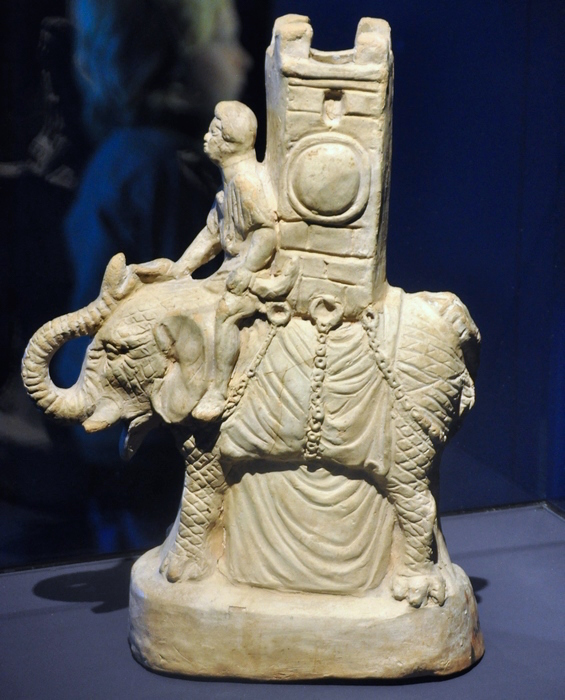
Roman statuette of a war elephant, recovered from Pompeii

The Carthaginians were recruiting fighting men from all over the Mediterranean region, and at around this time a large group of recruits from Greece arrived in Carthage. Among them was a Spartan mercenary commander, Xanthippus. Polybius states he had taken part in Spartan training methods and that he knew both how to deploy and how to manoeuvre an army. He made a good impression with the troops of the Carthaginian army, and was able to persuade the Carthaginian Senate that the strongest elements of their army were their cavalry and elephants and that to be deployed to best effect they needed to fight on open level ground. The historian John Lazenby speculates he may have previously faced elephants when Pyrrhus of Epirus attacked Sparta in the 270s BC. Xanthippus was put in charge of training over the winter, although a committee of Carthaginian generals retained operational control. As the prospect of a decisive battle drew nearer, and as Xanthippus's skill at manoeuvring the army became more evident, full control was given to him. Whether this was a decision of the Senate, the generals, or was forced on them by the wishes of the troops, who included many Carthaginian citizens, is not clear.

== Battle ==
Xanthippus led the army of 100 elephants, 4,000 cavalry and 12,000 infantry – the latter included the 5,000 veterans from Sicily and many citizen-militia – out of Carthage and set up camp close to the Romans in an area of open plain. The precise site is not known, but it is assumed to be close to Tunis. The Roman army of about 15,000 infantry and 500 cavalry advanced to meet them, and set up camp about 2 km (1 mi) away. The next morning both sides deployed for battle. Xanthippus placed the Carthaginian citizen-militia in the centre of his formation; with the Sicilian veterans and the freshly hired infantry divided on either side of them; and with the cavalry equally divided on either side of these. The elephants were deployed in a single line in front of the centre of the infantry. The Romans placed their legionary infantry in their centre, arranged in a deeper and denser formation than usual. Polybius considered this to be an effective anti-elephant formation, but points out that it shortened the frontage of the Roman infantry and made them liable to being out-flanked. Light infantry skirmishers were positioned in front of the legions, and the 500 cavalry were divided between the flanks. Regulus apparently hoped to punch through the elephants with his massed infantry, overcome the Carthaginian phalanx in their centre and so win the battle before he needed to worry about being attacked on the flanks.

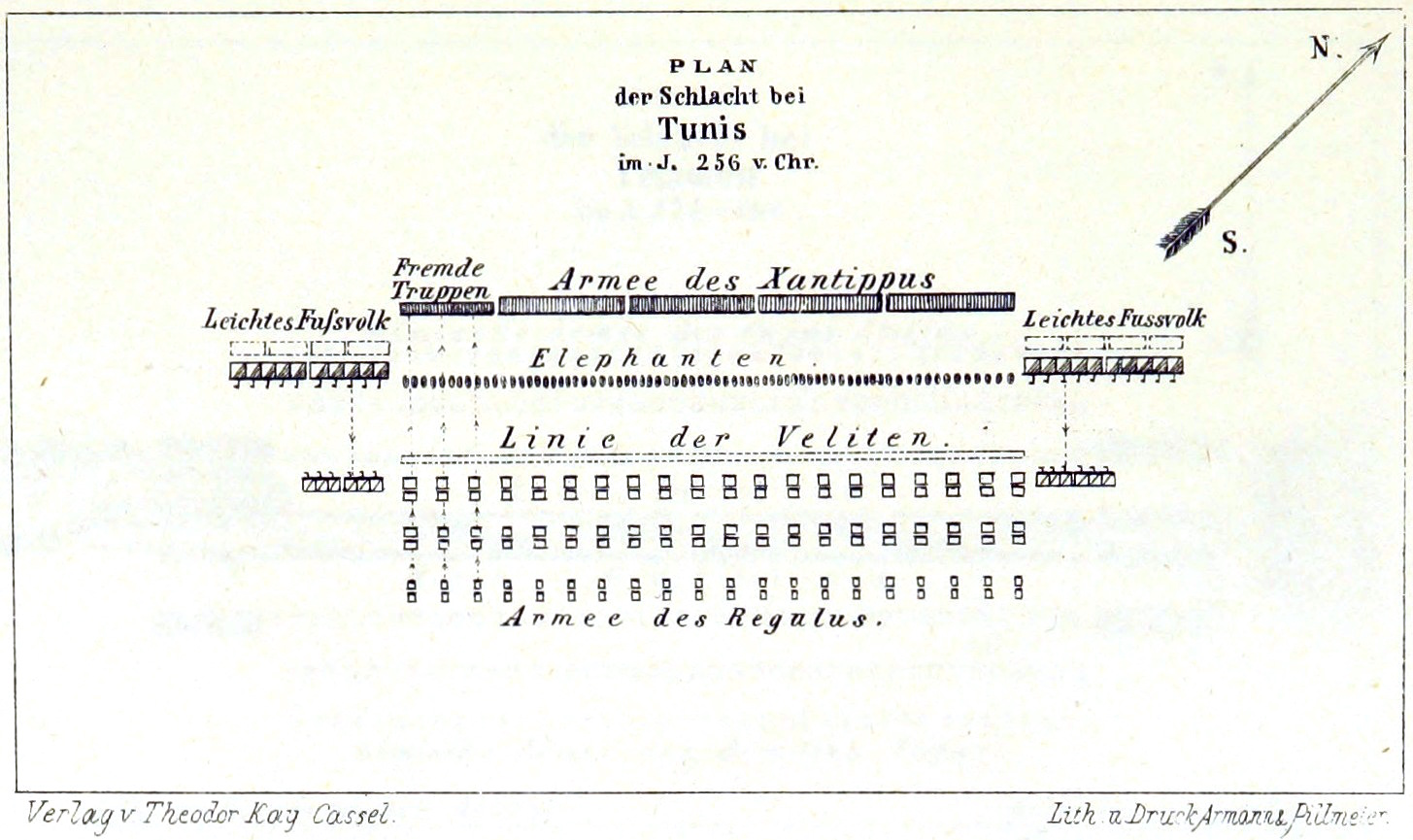
A plan of the battle: Carthaginians at top, Romans at bottom and elephants in the middle

The battle opened with attacks by the Carthaginian cavalry and elephants. The Roman cavalry, hopelessly outnumbered, were soon swept away. The Roman legionaries advanced, shouting and banging their sword hilts on their shields in an attempt to deter the elephants. Part of the Roman left overlapped the line of elephants, and they charged the infantry of the Carthaginian right, who broke and fled back to their camp, pursued by the Romans. This part of the Roman force probably consisted of Latin allies. The rest of the Roman infantry had difficulties with the elephants, who were not deterred by their noise but charged home, inflicting casualties and considerable confusion. At least some of the legionaries fought their way through the line of elephants, and attacked the Carthaginian phalanx. But they were too disordered to fight effectively and the phalanx held firm. Some units of the Carthaginian cavalry were now returning from their pursuit and started to attack or feint against the Roman rear and flanks. The Romans attempted to fight on all sides which brought their forward momentum to a halt.

The Romans held firm, possibly partly because of the way their dense formation jammed them close together, but the elephants continued to rampage through their ranks, and the Carthaginian cavalry pinned them in place by hurling missiles into their rear and flanks. Then Xanthippus ordered the phalanx to attack. Most of the Romans were packed into a space where they could not resist effectively and were slaughtered. Regulus and a small force fought their way out of the encirclement, but were pursued and shortly he and 500 survivors were forced to surrender. (Note: Some later Roman accounts make various claims of Regulus being mistreated, but Polybius does not mention this and Diodorus, a writer hostile to the Carthaginians, suggests he died from natural causes.) A total of about 13,000 Romans were killed. The Carthaginians lost 800 men from the force on their right which was routed; the losses of the rest of their army are not known. A force of 2,000 Romans survived, from the left wing who had broken through into the Carthaginian camp; they escaped the battlefield and retreated to Aspis. This was Carthage's only victory in a major land battle during the war.

== Aftermath ==
Xanthippus, fearful of the envy of the Carthaginian generals he had outdone, took his pay and returned to Greece. Regulus died in Carthaginian captivity; later Roman authors invented a tale of him displaying heroic virtue while a prisoner. The Romans sent a fleet to evacuate their survivors and the Carthaginians attempted to oppose it. In the resulting Battle of Cape Hermaeum off Africa the Carthaginians were heavily defeated, losing 114 ships captured and 16 sunk. The Roman fleet, in turn, was devastated by a storm while returning to Italy, 384 ships having been sunk from their total of 464 (Note: This assumes, per G.K. Tipps, that all 114 captured Carthaginian vessels were sailing with the Romans.) and 100,000 men lost, the majority non-Roman Latin allies. The war continued for a further 14 years, mostly on Sicily or the nearby waters, before ending with a Roman victory; the terms offered to Carthage were more generous than those proposed by Regulus. The question of which state was to control the western Mediterranean remained open, and their relationship was tense. When Carthage besieged the Roman-protected town of Saguntum in eastern Iberia in 218 BC, it ignited the Second Punic War with Rome.

== Notes, citations and sources ==
=== Sources ===
- Andrei, Cristina; Nedu, Decebal (2010). "The Campaign of Marcus Atilius Regulus in Africa, Military Operations by Sea and by Land (256−255 B.C.)". Constanta Maritime University Annals. Constanta, Romania: Constanta Maritime University: 206–209. ISSN 1582-3601.
- Bagnall, Nigel (1999). The Punic Wars: Rome, Carthage and the Struggle for the Mediterranean. London: Pimlico. ISBN 978-0-7126-6608-4.
- Broughton, Thomas Robert Shannon (1986). The Magistrates of the Roman Republic. Atlanta: Scholars Press. ISBN 978-0-89130-812-6.
- Casson, Lionel (1991). The Ancient Mariners (2nd ed.). Princeton, New Jersey: Princeton University Press. ISBN 978-0-691-06836-7.
- Champion, Craige B. (2015) [2011]. "Polybius and the Punic Wars". In Hoyos, Dexter (ed.). A Companion to the Punic Wars. Chichester, West Sussex: John Wiley. pp. 58–76. ISBN 978-1-119-02550-4.
- Collins, Roger (1998). Spain: An Oxford Archaeological Guide. Oxford: Oxford University Press. ISBN 978-0-19-285300-4.
- Curry, Andrew (2012). "The Weapon That Changed History". Archaeology. 65 (1): 32–37. JSTOR 41780760.
- Erdkamp, Paul (2015) [2011]. "Manpower and Food Supply in the First and Second Punic Wars". In Hoyos, Dexter (ed.). A Companion to the Punic Wars. Chichester, West Sussex: John Wiley. pp. 58–76. ISBN 978-1-119-02550-4.
- Goldsworthy, Adrian (2006). The Fall of Carthage: The Punic Wars 265–146 BC. London: Phoenix. ISBN 978-0-304-36642-2.
- Hau, Lisa Irene (2016). Moral History from Herodotus to Diodorus Siculus. Edinburgh: Edinburgh University Press. ISBN 978-1-4744-1107-3.
- Hoyos, Dexter (2010). The Carthaginians. London: Routledge. ISBN 978-1-136-96862-4.
- Hoyos, Dexter (2015) [2011]. A Companion to the Punic Wars. Chichester, West Sussex: John Wiley. ISBN 978-1-119-02550-4.
- Kistler, John (2006). War Elephants. Westport, Connecticut: Praeger. ISBN 978-0-8032-6004-7.
- Koon, Sam (2015) [2011]. "Phalanx and Legion: the "Face" of Punic War Battle". In Hoyos, Dexter (ed.). A Companion to the Punic Wars. Chichester, West Sussex: John Wiley. pp. 77–94. ISBN 978-1-119-02550-4.
- Lazenby, John Francis (1996). The First Punic War: A Military History. Stanford, California: Stanford University Press. ISBN 0-8047-2673-6. (registration required)
- Miles, Richard (2011). Carthage Must be Destroyed. London: Penguin. ISBN 978-0-14-101809-6.
- Mineo, Bernard (2015) [2011]. "Principal Literary Sources for the Punic Wars (apart from Polybius)". In Hoyos, Dexter (ed.). A Companion to the Punic Wars. Chichester, West Sussex: John Wiley. pp. 111–127. ISBN 978-1-119-02550-4.
- Rankov, Boris (2015) [2011]. "A War of Phases: Strategies and Stalemates". In Hoyos, Dexter (ed.). A Companion to the Punic Wars. Chichester, West Sussex: John Wiley. pp. 149–166. ISBN 978-1-4051-7600-2.
- Shutt, R.J.H. (1938). "Polybius: A Sketch". Greece & Rome. 8 (22): 50–57. doi:10.1017/S001738350000588X. JSTOR 642112. S2CID 162905667.
- Sidwell, Keith C.; Jones, Peter V. (1998). The World of Rome: an Introduction to Roman Culture. Cambridge: Cambridge University Press. ISBN 978-0-521-38600-5.
- Tipps, G.K. (1985). "The Battle of Ecnomus". Historia: Zeitschrift für Alte Geschichte. 34 (4): 432–465. JSTOR 4435938.
- Tipps, G.K. (2003). "The Defeat of Regulus". The Classical World. 96 (4): 375–385. doi:10.2307/4352788. JSTOR 4352788.
- Walbank, Frank (1959). "Naval Triaii". The Classical Review. 64 (1): 10–11. doi:10.1017/S0009840X00092258. JSTOR 702509. S2CID 162463877.
- Walbank, Frank (1990). Polybius. Vol. 1. Berkeley: University of California Press. ISBN 978-0-520-06981-7.
- Warmington, Brian Herbert (1993) [1960]. Carthage. New York: Barnes & Noble. ISBN 978-1-56619-210-1.
