= 255 BC =

255 BC in various calendars
Gregorian calendar	255 BC; CCLV BC
Ab urbe condita	499
Ancient Egypt era	XXXIII dynasty, 69
Pharaoh	Ptolemy II Philadelphus, 29
Ancient Greek Olympiad (summer)	131st Olympiad, year 2
Assyrian calendar	4496
Balinese saka calendar	N/A
Bengali calendar	−848 – −847
Berber calendar	696
Buddhist calendar	290
Burmese calendar	−892
Byzantine calendar	5254–5255
Chinese calendar	乙巳年 (Wood Snake); 2443 or 2236 — to — 丙午年 (Fire Horse); 2444 or 2237
Coptic calendar	−538 – −537
Discordian calendar	912
Ethiopian calendar	−262 – −261
Hebrew calendar	3506–3507
- Hindu calendars
Vikram Samvat	−198 – −197
Shaka Samvat	N/A
Kali Yuga	2846–2847
Holocene calendar	9746
Iranian calendar	876 BP – 875 BP
Islamic calendar	903 BH – 902 BH
Javanese calendar	N/A
Julian calendar	N/A
Korean calendar	2079
Minguo calendar	2166 before ROC 民前2166年
Nanakshahi calendar	−1722
Seleucid era	57/58 AG
Thai solar calendar	288–289
Tibetan calendar	ཤིང་མོ་སྦྲུལ་ལོ་ (female Wood-Snake) −128 or −509 or −1281 — to — མེ་ཕོ་རྟ་ལོ་ (male Fire-Horse) −127 or −508 or −1280

Year 255 BC was a year of the pre-Julian Roman calendar. At the time it was known as the Year of the Consulship of Nobilior and Paullus (or, less frequently, year 499 Ab urbe condita). The denomination 255 BC for this year has been used since the early medieval period, when the Anno Domini calendar era became the prevalent method in Europe for naming years.

== Events ==
=== By place ===
==== Roman Republic ====
- The Battle of Adis (or Adys) is fought near the city of that name, 40 miles (64 kilometres) southeast of Carthage, between Carthaginian forces and a Roman army led by Marcus Atilius Regulus. The Romans inflict a crushing defeat upon the Carthaginians, and the latter then sue for peace. The ensuing negotiations between the parties lead to Regulus demanding Carthage agree to an unconditional surrender, cede Sicily, Corsica and Sardinia to Rome, renounce the use of their navy, pay an indemnity, and sign a vassal-like treaty. These terms are so harsh that the people of Carthage resolve to keep fighting.
- The Carthaginians, angered by Regulus' demands, hire Xanthippus, a Spartan mercenary, to reorganize the army. The revitalised Carthaginian army, led by Xanthippus, decisively defeat the Romans in the Battle of Tunis and capture their commander Marcus Atilius Regulus. A Roman fleet, sent to rescue Regulus and his troops, is wrecked in a storm off Sicily.

==== Egypt ====
- In the Second Syrian War, Ptolemy II loses ground in Cilicia, Pamphylia, and Ionia, while Antiochus II regains Miletus and Ephesus. A peace is then concluded between Antiochus and Ptolemy under which Antiochus is to marry Ptolemy's daughter Berenice Syra.

==== Bactria ====
- Diodotus I, Seleucid satrap of Bactria, rebels against Antiochus II and becomes the founder of the Greco-Bactrian Kingdom.

==== China ====
- King Hui of Zhou becomes the last claimant king of the Zhou dynasty of China.

== Births ==
- Xu Fu, ancient Chinese alchemist
