= Battle of Adys =

256 BC battle of the First Punic War

- Part of the First Punic War
Date	Late 256 BC
Location	Adys, Carthage (present-day Oudna, Tunisia) 36°36′25″N 10°10′25″E
Result	Roman victory

Belligerents
Rome	Carthage

Commanders and leaders
Marcus Atilius Regulus	Bostar; Hamilcar; Hasdrubal

Strength
15,000 infantry 500 cavalry	12,000 infantry 4,000 cavalry 100 war elephants

Casualties and losses
Few	
- Location within Tunisia

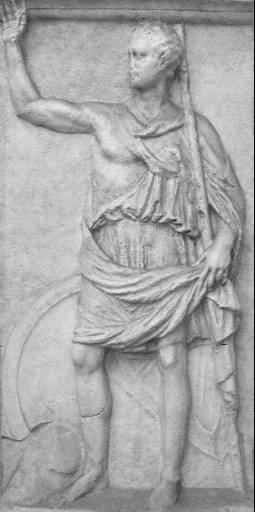
Polybius – "a remarkably well-informed, industrious, and insightful historian"

The battle of Adys (or Adis) took place in late 256 BC during the First Punic War between a Carthaginian army jointly commanded by Bostar, Hamilcar and Hasdrubal and a Roman army led by Marcus Atilius Regulus. (Note: Usually identified from the other Carthaginians named Hasdrubal as "the son of Hanno".) Earlier in the year, the new Roman navy had established naval superiority and used this advantage to invade the Carthaginian homeland, which roughly aligned with modern Tunisia in North Africa. After landing on the Cape Bon Peninsula and conducting a successful campaign, the fleet returned to Sicily, leaving Regulus with 15,500 men to hold the lodgement in Africa over the winter.

Instead of holding his position, Regulus advanced towards the Carthaginian capital, Carthage. The Carthaginian army established itself on a rocky hill near Adys (modern Uthina) where Regulus was besieging the town. Regulus had his forces execute a night march to launch twin dawn assaults on the Carthaginians' fortified hilltop camp. One part of this force was repulsed and pursued down the hill. The other part then charged the pursuing Carthaginians in the rear and routed them in turn. At this the Carthaginians remaining in the camp panicked and fled.

The Romans advanced to and captured Tunis, only 16 kilometres (10 mi) from Carthage. Despairing, the Carthaginians sued for peace. The terms offered by Regulus were so harsh that Carthage resolved to fight on. A few months later, at the battle of the Bagradas River (battle of Tunis), Regulus was defeated and his army all but wiped out. The war continued for a further 14 years.

== Primary sources ==
The main source for almost every aspect of the First Punic War (Note: The term Punic comes from the Latin word Punicus (or Poenicus), meaning "Carthaginian", and is a reference to the Carthaginians' Phoenician ancestry.) is the historian Polybius (c. 200 – c. 118 BC), a Greek sent to Rome in 167 BC as a hostage. His works include a manual on military tactics, no longer extant but he is now known for The Histories, written sometime after 146 BC, or about a century after the battle of Adys. Polybius's work is considered broadly objective and largely neutral between the Carthaginian and Roman points of view. The accuracy of Polybius's account has been much debated over the past 150 years but the modern consensus is to accept it largely at face value and the details of the war in modern sources are largely based on interpretations of Polybius's account. The historian Andrew Curry sees Polybius as being "fairly reliable"; while Dexter Hoyos describes him as "a remarkably well-informed, industrious, and insightful historian". Other, later, ancient histories of the war exist but in fragmentary or summary form and they usually cover military operations on land in more detail than those at sea. Modern historians usually take into account the later histories of Diodorus Siculus and Dio Cassius, although the classicist Adrian Goldsworthy states "Polybius' account is usually to be preferred when it differs with any of our other accounts". (Note: Sources other than Polybius are discussed by Bernard Mineo in "Principal Literary Sources for the Punic Wars (apart from Polybius)".) Other sources include inscriptions, archaeological evidence and empirical evidence from reconstructions such as the trireme Olympias.

== Background ==
The First Punic War between the states of Carthage and Rome began in 264 BC. Carthage was the leading maritime power in the Western Mediterranean, its navy dominating both militarily and commercially. Rome had recently unified mainland Italy south of the Arno. The immediate cause of the war was a wish to control the Sicilian town of Messana (modern Messina). More broadly both sides wished to control Syracuse, the most powerful city-state in Sicily. By 260 BC the war had grown into a struggle in which the Romans wanted at least control the whole of Sicily.

The Carthaginians were engaging in their traditional policy of waiting for their opponents to wear themselves out, in the expectation of then regaining some or all of their possessions and negotiating a mutually satisfactory peace treaty. The Romans were essentially a land-based power and had gained control of most of Sicily using their army. The war there had reached a stalemate, as the Carthaginians focused on defending their well-fortified towns and cities; these were mostly on the coast and so could be supplied and reinforced by sea without the Romans being able to use their superior army to interfere. The focus of the war shifted to the sea, where the Romans had little experience; on the few occasions they had previously felt the need for a naval presence they had relied on small squadrons provided by their allies. In 260 BC Romans set out to construct a fleet using a shipwrecked Carthaginian quinquereme as a blueprint for their own ships.

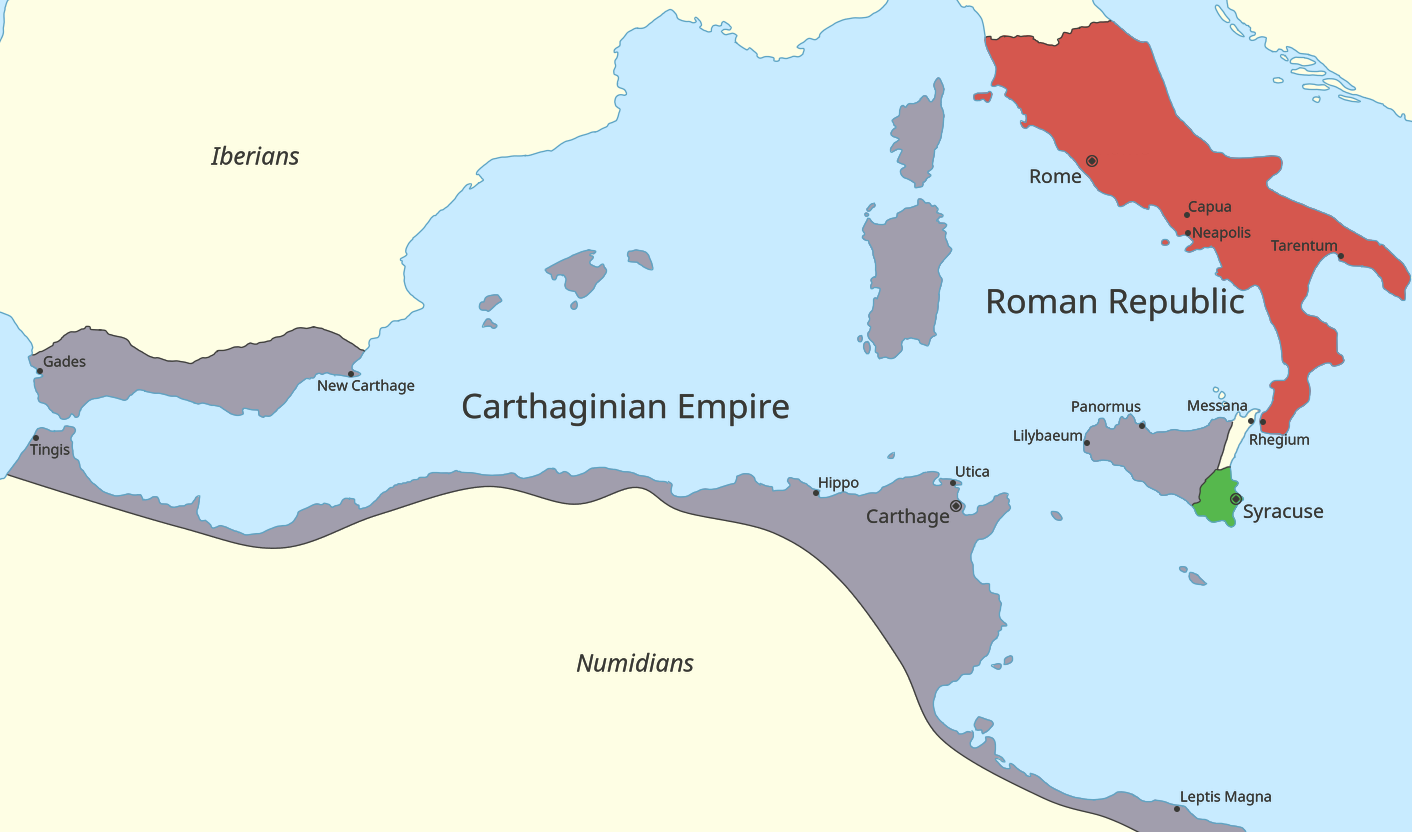
Territory controlled by Rome and Carthage at the start of the First Punic War

Naval victories at Mylae and Sulci, and their frustration at the continuing stalemate in Sicily, led the Romans to focus on a sea-based strategy and to develop a plan to invade the Carthaginian heartland in North Africa and threaten their capital, Carthage (close to what is now Tunis). Both sides were determined to establish naval supremacy and invested large amounts of money and manpower in increasing and maintaining the size of their navies.

The Roman fleet of 330 warships plus an unknown number of transport ships sailed from Ostia, the port of Rome, in early 256 BC, commanded by the consuls for the year, Marcus Atilius Regulus and Lucius Manlius Vulso Longus. They embarked approximately 26,000 picked legionaries from the Roman forces on Sicily. The Carthaginians were aware of the Romans' intentions and mustered all 350 available warships under Hanno (Note: He was known as Hanno the Great, the second (of three) Carthaginians named Hanno to be awarded that sobriquet.) and Hamilcar, off the south coast of Sicily to intercept them. A combined total of about 680 warships carrying up to 290,000 crew and marines (Note: The modern historian Boris Rankov writes that it "may have involved the largest number of combatants of any naval battle in history"; a view also put forward by the classicist John Lazenby.) met in the battle of Cape Ecnomus. The Carthaginians took the initiative, anticipating that their superior ship-handling skills would tell. After a prolonged and confused day of fighting the Carthaginians were defeated, losing 30 ships sunk and 64 captured to Roman losses of 24 ships sunk.

== Prelude ==
As a result of the sea battle, the Roman army, commanded by Regulus, landed in Africa near Aspis (modern Kelibia) on the Cape Bon Peninsula in summer 256 BC and began ravaging the Carthaginian countryside. They captured 20,000 slaves and "vast herds of cattle", and after a brief siege, captured the city of Aspis. They also fomented rebellions in many of Carthage's subject territories. The Roman Senate sent orders for most of the Roman ships and a large part of the army to return to Sicily, probably due to the logistical difficulties of feeding these more than 100,000 men over the winter. Regulus was left with 40 ships, 15,000 infantry and 500 cavalry to overwinter in Africa. His orders were to weaken the Carthaginian army pending reinforcement in the spring. It was expected he would achieve this by raids and by encouraging Carthage's rebellious subject territories, but consuls had wide discretion.

Regulus chose to take his relatively small force and strike inland. He advanced on the city of Adys (modern Uthina), only 60 kilometres (40 mi) south-east of Carthage, and besieged it. The Carthaginians, meanwhile, had recalled Hamilcar from Sicily with 5,000 infantry and 500 cavalry. Hamilcar and two generals named Hasdrubal and Bostar were placed in joint command of an army which was strong in cavalry and elephants and was approximately the same size as the Roman force.

== Armies ==
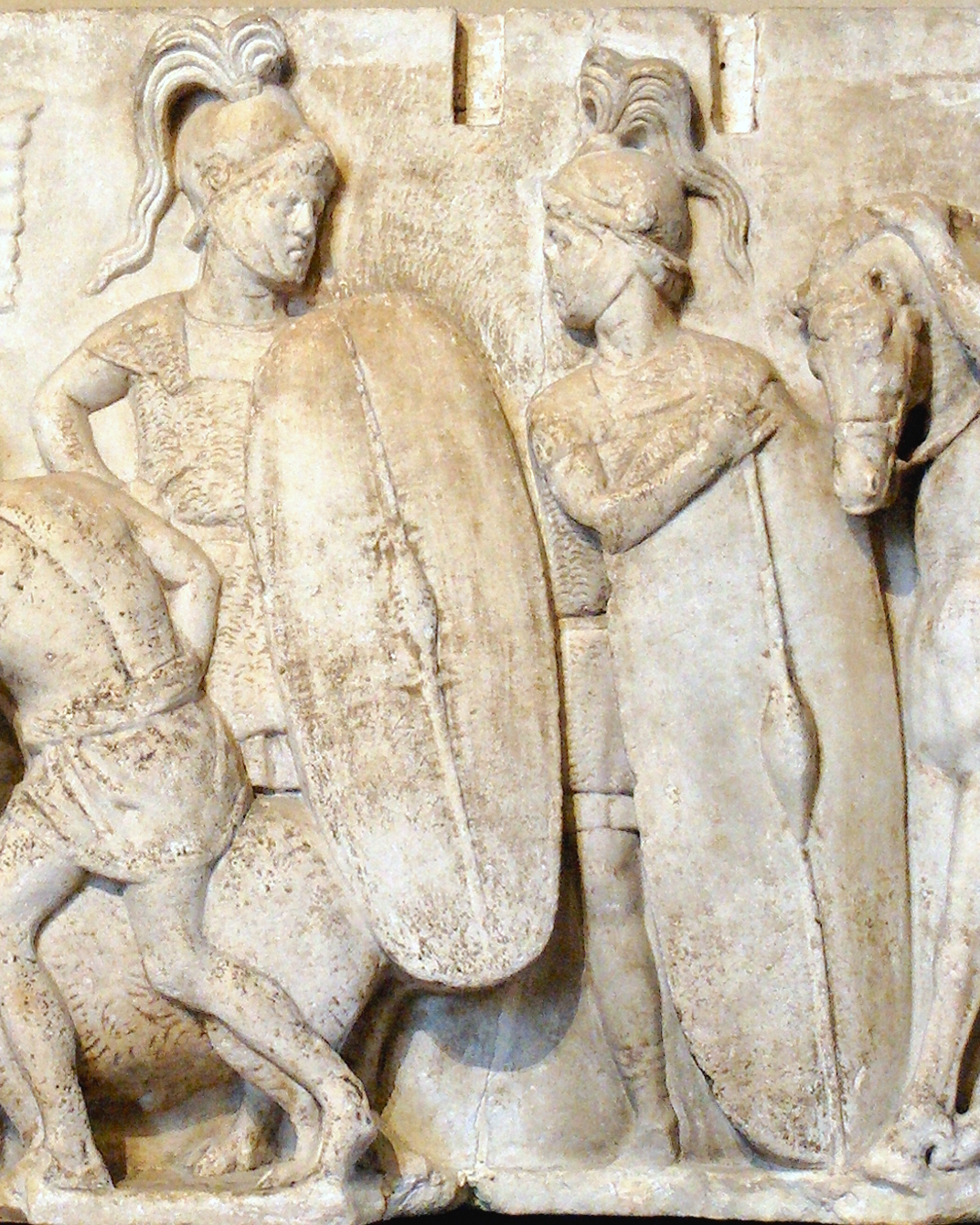
Detail from the second century BC Ahenobarbus relief showing two Roman foot-soldiers

Most male Roman citizens were liable for military service and served as infantry, with a more wealthy minority providing a cavalry component. Traditionally, each year the Romans would raise two legions, each of 4,200 infantry (Note: This could be increased to 5,000 in some circumstances.) and 300 cavalry. A small number of the infantry served as javelin-armed skirmishers. The balance were equipped as heavy infantry, with body armour, a large shield, and short thrusting swords. They were divided into three ranks, of which the front rank also carried two javelins, while the second and third ranks had a thrusting spear instead. Both legionary sub-units and individual legionaries fought in relatively open order, or relatively well spaced from each other compared with the more tightly packed close order formations common at the time. An army was usually formed by combining a Roman legion with a similarly sized and equipped legion provided by their Latin allies. It is not clear how the 15,000 infantry at Adys were constituted, but the modern historian John Lazenby suggests that they may have represented four slightly under-strength legions: two Roman and two allied. Regulus did not attract any troops from the towns and cities rebelling against Carthage. In this he differed from other generals, including Roman ones, leading armies against Carthage in Africa. The reasons for this are not known, and Lazenby states that his failure to make up his deficiency in cavalry in particular is puzzling.

Carthaginian male citizens, who were largely inhabitants of the city of Carthage, served in their army only if there was a direct threat to the city. When they did they fought as well-armoured heavy infantry armed with long thrusting spears, although they were notoriously ill-trained and ill-disciplined. In most circumstances Carthage recruited foreigners to make up its army. Many would be from North Africa which provided several types of fighters including: close-order infantry equipped with large shields, helmets, short swords and long thrusting spears; javelin-armed light infantry skirmishers; close-order shock cavalry carrying spears; and light cavalry skirmishers who threw javelins from a distance and avoided close combat. Both Iberia and Gaul provided small numbers of experienced infantry: unarmoured troops who would charge ferociously, but had a reputation for breaking off if a combat was protracted. (Note: The Spanish used a heavy throwing spear which the Romans were later to adopt as the pilum.) Most of the Carthaginian infantry fought in a tightly packed formation known as a phalanx. Slingers were frequently recruited from the Balearic Islands, although it is not clear if any were present at Adys. The Carthaginians also employed war elephants; North Africa had indigenous African forest elephants at the time. The precise makeup of the army at Adys is not known, but a few months later, at the battle of Tunis, the Carthaginians fielded 100 elephants, 4,000 cavalry and 12,000 infantry; the latter would have included the 5,000 veterans from Sicily and many citizen-militia.

== Battle ==
Determined to prevent the Romans further despoiling the countryside, the Carthaginians advanced to Adys, where they set up a fortified camp on a rocky hill near the town. They did not wish to commit to a battle on the open ground around Adys too hastily. Polybius is critical of this decision by the Carthaginians, as their main advantages over the Romans were their cavalry and their elephants, neither of which could be deployed to advantage from behind fortifications, on steep ground, or in rough terrain. Modern historians point out that the Carthaginian generals would have been well aware of the strength of the legions when formed up in open battle and that to pause in a strong position while scouting the enemy and formulating a plan was not obviously a mistake. This was especially the case as their army was newly formed and not yet fully trained or used to operating together; although the modern historian George Tipps describes this deployment as a "total misuse" of their cavalry and elephants.

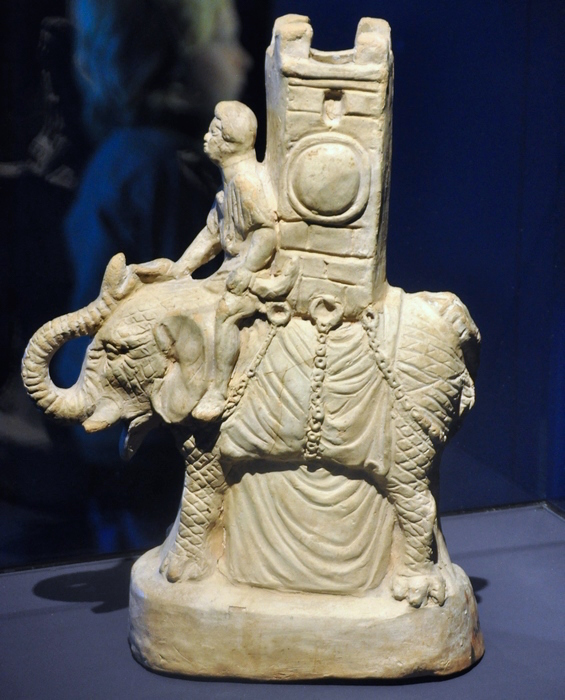
Roman statuette of a war elephant recovered from Pompeii

With the Carthaginian army overlooking him from a fortified hill Regulus immediately made the audacious decision to split his army in two and have each carry out a night march to launch a surprise dawn attack on the camp. The Romans would be attacking uphill against the Carthaginians' prepared position, but an attack from two directions would be difficult to respond to. Tipps describes the plan as a demonstration of Regulus's "recklessness". Both Roman forces were in position on time and successfully launched their attacks, although apparently not simultaneously. Complete surprise cannot have been achieved, as at least a large part of the Carthaginians were able to form up and confront one half of the Roman assault. This column was thrown back by the Carthaginians – it is assumed at the line of their fortifications, although this is not certain – and driven down the hill in disorder. The situation was confused, with the rest of the Carthaginians taking no effective action and failing to co-ordinate with their victorious colleagues. According to the military historian Nigel Bagnall, the cavalry and elephants were promptly evacuated, as it was recognised they would not be able to play any useful role, either in defending the fortifications or on the broken terrain of the hill more generally.

Those Carthaginians pursuing the first Roman force chased them off the hill, and all or part of the second Roman column, rather than attacking the Carthaginian camp, charged downhill into the rear of the now over-extended Carthaginians. It is possible this group of Carthaginians also faced a frontal counter-attack by Roman reserves after leaving the hill. In any event, after some further fighting they fled the field. At this the Carthaginians in the camp, the fortifications of which had not been breached, panicked and withdrew. The Romans pursued for some distance, although Polybius provides no figures for Carthaginian losses. Modern historians suggest the Carthaginians suffered few or no losses to their cavalry and elephants. Breaking off their pursuit, the victorious Romans plundered the hilltop camp.

== Aftermath ==
A map of the campaign of which Adys was a part. The approximate site of the battle is denoted by "2". 1: Romans land and capture Aspis (256 BC) 2: Roman victory at Adys (256 BC) 3: Romans capture Tunis (256 BC) 4: Xanthippus sets out from Carthage with a large army (255 BC) 5: Romans are defeated at the battle of the Bagradas River. (255 BC) 6: Romans retreat to Aspis and leave Africa. (255 BC)

The Romans followed up on their victory and captured numerous towns, including Tunis, only 16 km (10 mi) from Carthage. From Tunis the Romans raided and devastated the immediate area around Carthage. Many of Carthage's African possessions took the opportunity to rise in revolt. The city of Carthage was packed with refugees fleeing Regulus or the rebels and food ran out. In despair, the Carthaginians sued for peace. Regulus, within sight of what he took to be a thoroughly defeated Carthage, demanded harsh terms: Carthage was to hand over Sicily, Sardinia and Corsica; pay all of Rome's war expenses; pay tribute to Rome each year; be prohibited from declaring war or making peace without Roman permission; have its navy limited to a single warship; but provide 50 large warships to the Romans on their request. Finding these terms completely unacceptable, the Carthaginians decided to fight on.

They gave charge of the training of their army to the Spartan mercenary commander Xanthippus. In 255 BC Xanthippus led an army of 12,000 infantry, 4,000 cavalry and 100 elephants against the Romans and decisively defeated them at the battle of Tunis. Approximately 2,000 Romans retreated to Aspis; 500, including Regulus, were captured; the rest were killed. Xanthippus, fearful of the envy of the Carthaginian generals he had outdone, took his pay and returned to Greece.

The Romans sent a fleet to evacuate their survivors and the Carthaginians attempted to oppose it. In the resulting battle of Cape Hermaeum off Africa the Carthaginians were heavily defeated, losing 114 ships captured. The Roman fleet, in turn, was devastated by a storm while returning to Italy, with 384 ships sunk from their total of 464 (Note: This assumes, per G. K. Tipps, that all 114 captured Carthaginian vessels were sailing with the Romans.) and 100,000 men lost, the majority non-Roman Latin allies. The war continued for a further 14 years, mostly on Sicily or the nearby waters, before ending with a Roman victory; the terms offered to Carthage were more generous than those proposed by Regulus. The question of which state was to control the western Mediterranean remained open, and when Carthage besieged the Roman-protected town of Saguntum in eastern Iberia in 218 BC, it ignited the Second Punic War with Rome.

== Notes, citations and sources ==
=== Sources ===
- Andrei, Cristina; Nedu, Decebal (2010). "The Campaign of Marcus Atilius Regulus in Africa, Military Operations by Sea and by Land (256–255 B.C.)". Constanta Maritime University Annals. Constanta, Romania: Constanta Maritime University: 206–209. ISSN 1582-3601.
- Bagnall, Nigel (1999). The Punic Wars: Rome, Carthage and the Struggle for the Mediterranean. London: Pimlico. ISBN 978-0-7126-6608-4.
- Champion, Craige B. (2015) [2011]. "Polybius and the Punic Wars". In Hoyos, Dexter (ed.). A Companion to the Punic Wars. Chichester, West Sussex: John Wiley. pp. 95–110. doi:10.1002/9781444393712.ch6. ISBN 978-1-4051-7600-2.
- Collins, Roger (1998). Spain: An Oxford Archaeological Guide. Oxford University Press. ISBN 978-0-19-285300-4.
- Curry, Andrew (2012). "The Weapon That Changed History". Archaeology. 65 (1): 32–37. JSTOR 41780760.
- Erdkamp, Paul (2015) [2011]. "Manpower and Food Supply in the First and Second Punic Wars". In Hoyos, Dexter (ed.). A Companion to the Punic Wars. Chichester, West Sussex: John Wiley. pp. 58–76. doi:10.1002/9781444393712.ch4. ISBN 978-1-4051-7600-2.
- Goldsworthy, Adrian (2006). The Fall of Carthage: The Punic Wars 265–146 BC. London: Phoenix. ISBN 978-0-304-36642-2.
- Hau, Lisa Irene (2016). Moral History from Herodotus to Diodorus Siculus. Edinburgh: Edinburgh University Press. doi:10.3366/edinburgh/9781474411073.001.0001. ISBN 978-1-4744-1107-3.
- Hoyos, Dexter (2007). Truceless War: Carthage's Fight for Survival, 241 to 237 BC. Leiden; Boston: Brill. doi:10.1163/ej.9789004160767.i-294. ISBN 978-90-474-2192-4.
- Hoyos, Dexter (2015) [2011]. A Companion to the Punic Wars. Chichester, West Sussex: John Wiley. ISBN 978-1-4051-7600-2.
- Koon, Sam (2015) [2011]. "Phalanx and Legion: the 'Face' of Punic War Battle". In Hoyos, Dexter (ed.). A Companion to the Punic Wars. Chichester, West Sussex: John Wiley. pp. 77–94. doi:10.1002/9781444393712.ch5. ISBN 978-1-4051-7600-2.
- Lazenby, John Francis (1996). The First Punic War: A Military History. Stanford, California: Stanford University Press. ISBN 978-0-8047-2674-0.
- Miles, Richard (2011). Carthage Must be Destroyed. London: Penguin. ISBN 978-0-14-101809-6.
- Mineo, Bernard (2015) [2011]. "Principal Literary Sources for the Punic Wars (apart from Polybius)". In Hoyos, Dexter (ed.). A Companion to the Punic Wars. Chichester, West Sussex: John Wiley. pp. 111–127. doi:10.1002/9781444393712.ch7. ISBN 978-1-4051-7600-2.
- Rankov, Boris (2015) [2011]. "A War of Phases: Strategies and Stalemates". In Hoyos, Dexter (ed.). A Companion to the Punic Wars. Chichester, West Sussex: John Wiley. pp. 149–166. doi:10.1002/9781444393712.ch9. ISBN 978-1-4051-7600-2.
- Shutt, R. J. H. (1938). "Polybius: A Sketch". Greece & Rome. 8 (22): 50–57. doi:10.1017/S001738350000588X. JSTOR 642112. S2CID 162905667.
- Sidwell, Keith C.; Jones, Peter V. (1998). The World of Rome: an Introduction to Roman Culture. Cambridge: Cambridge University Press. ISBN 978-0-521-38600-5.
- Tipps, G. K. (1985). "The Battle of Ecnomus". Historia: Zeitschrift für Alte Geschichte. 34 (4): 432–465. JSTOR 4435938.
- Tipps, G. K. (2003). "The Defeat of Regulus". The Classical World. 96 (4): 375–385. doi:10.2307/4352788. JSTOR 4352788.
- Walbank, Frank (1959). "Naval Triaii". The Classical Review. 64 (1): 10–11. doi:10.1017/S0009840X00092258. JSTOR 702509. S2CID 162463877.
- Walbank, F. W. (1990). Polybius. Vol. I. Berkeley: University of California Press. ISBN 978-0-520-06981-7.
- Warmington, Brian Herbert (1993) [1960]. Carthage. New York: Barnes & Noble. ISBN 978-1-56619-210-1.
