= 256 BC =

256 BC in various calendars
Gregorian calendar	256 BC; CCLVI BC
Ab urbe condita	498
Ancient Egypt era	XXXIII dynasty, 68
Pharaoh	Ptolemy II Philadelphus, 28
Ancient Greek Olympiad (summer)	131st Olympiad (victor)¹
Assyrian calendar	4495
Balinese saka calendar	N/A
Bengali calendar	−849 – −848
Berber calendar	695
Buddhist calendar	289
Burmese calendar	−893
Byzantine calendar	5253–5254
Chinese calendar	甲辰年 (Wood Dragon); 2442 or 2235 — to — 乙巳年 (Wood Snake); 2443 or 2236
Coptic calendar	−539 – −538
Discordian calendar	911
Ethiopian calendar	−263 – −262
Hebrew calendar	3505–3506
- Hindu calendars
Vikram Samvat	−199 – −198
Shaka Samvat	N/A
Kali Yuga	2845–2846
Holocene calendar	9745
Iranian calendar	877 BP – 876 BP
Islamic calendar	904 BH – 903 BH
Javanese calendar	N/A
Julian calendar	N/A
Korean calendar	2078
Minguo calendar	2167 before ROC 民前2167年
Nanakshahi calendar	−1723
Seleucid era	56/57 AG
Thai solar calendar	287–288
Tibetan calendar	阳木龙年 (male Wood-Dragon) −129 or −510 or −1282 — to — 阴木蛇年 (female Wood-Snake) −128 or −509 or −1281

Year 256 BC was a year of the pre-Julian Roman calendar. At the time it was known as the Year of the Consulship of Longus and Caedicius/Regulus (or, less frequently, year 498 Ab urbe condita). The denomination 256 BC for this year has been used since the early medieval period, when the Anno Domini calendar era became the prevalent method in Europe for naming years.

== Events ==
=== By place ===
==== Roman Republic ====
- Rome aims for a quick end to hostilities in the First Punic War and decides to invade the Carthaginian colonies in Northern Africa to force the enemy to accept terms. A major fleet is built, including transports for the army and its equipment, and warships for their protection. Carthage under Hamilcar tries to intervene but a force under the Roman general and consul Marcus Atilius Regulus and his colleague Lucius Manlius Vulso Longus defeat the Carthaginian fleet in the Battle of Cape Ecnomus off the southern coast of Sicily.

==== North Africa ====
- Following the Battle of Cape Ecnomus, the Romans land an army near Carthage (Tunesia, North Africa) and begin ravaging the Carthaginian countryside. The Roman army soon forces the capitulation of Clupea, a town 40 miles (64 kilometres) east of Carthage. After setting up Roman defenses for the city, the two consuls receive instructions from Rome that Vulso is to set sail for Rome, taking most of the fleet with him. Regulus, on the other hand, is to stay with the infantry and cavalry to finish the war.
- Marcus Atilius Regulus marches to Aspis and takes the town after a short siege.
- From their new base at Aspis the Romans march on towards Carthage; they encounter and defeat the Carthaginian army at the Battle of Adys.

==== China ====
- The Great Wall of China construction starts.
- Luoyang falls without much resistance to the armies of the Qin, ending the reign of the emperor Zhou Nan Wang. Although a successor was appointed as Dong Zhou Hui Wang, traditionally in Chinese history this is considered the end of the Zhou dynasty.
- The Du Jiang Yan Irrigation System is constructed, ending flooding and irrigating thousands of square miles of land through an ingeniously designed system.

== Births ==
- Liu Bang, founder of the Han dynasty of China (d. 195 BC)

== Deaths ==
- Zhou Nan Wang, Chinese king of the Zhou dynasty
