= Battle of Cape Ecnomus =

Naval battle of the First Punic War; possibly the largest in history

- Part of the First Punic War
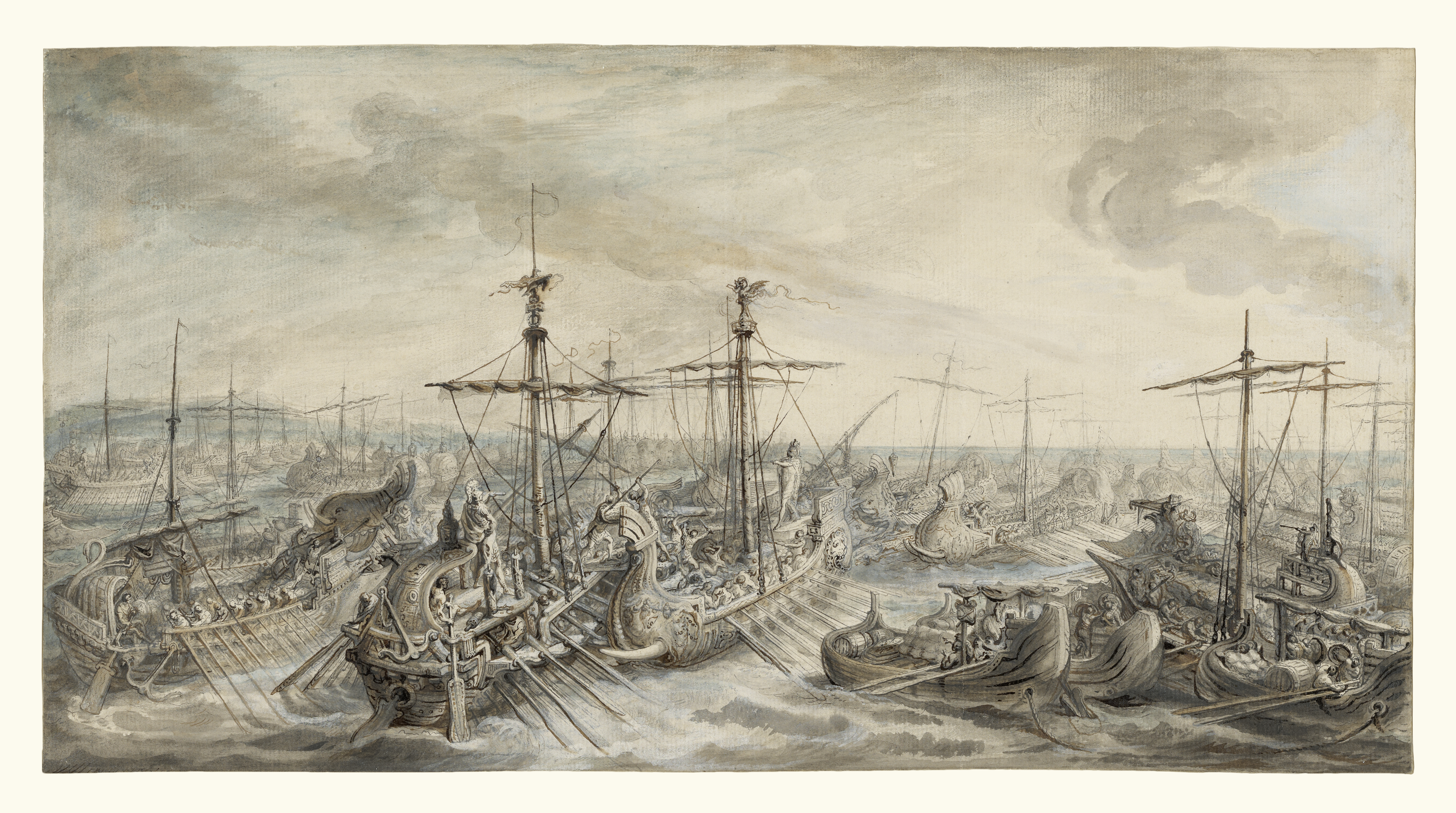
- 1763 painting
| Date | 256 BC |
| Location | Off southern Sicily 37.0500°N 13.9000°E |
| Result | Roman victory |

Belligerents
| Roman Republic | Carthage |

Commanders and leaders
| Marcus Atilius Regulus; Lucius Manlius Vulso | Hamilcar; Hanno |

Strength
| 330 ships 138,600–140,000 crew and marines | 350 ships 147,000–150,000 crew and marines |

Casualties and losses
| 24 ships sunk 10,000 men killed | 30 ships sunk 64 ships captured 30,000–40,000 men killed or captured |
- Location of the battle, off the south coast of Sicily

The Battle of Cape Ecnomus or Eknomos (Ancient Greek: Ἔκνομος) was a naval battle, fought off southern Sicily, in 256 BC, between the fleets of Carthage and the Roman Republic, during the First Punic War (264–241 BC). The Carthaginian fleet was commanded by Hanno (Note: He was known as Hanno the Great, the second (of three) Carthaginians named Hanno to be awarded that sobriquet.) and Hamilcar; the Roman fleet jointly by the consuls for the year, Marcus Atilius Regulus and Lucius Manlius Vulso Longus. It resulted in a clear victory for the Romans.

The Roman fleet of 330 warships plus an unknown number of transports had sailed from Ostia, the port of Rome, and had embarked approximately 26,000 picked legionaries shortly before the battle. They planned to cross to Africa and invade the Carthaginian homeland, in Tunisia. The Carthaginians were aware of the Romans' intentions and mustered all available warships, 350, off the south coast of Sicily to intercept them. With a combined total of about 680 warships carrying up to 290,000 crew and marines, the battle was arguably the single largest battle of ancient history, and was possibly the largest naval battle in history by the number of combatants involved. (Note: Many historians have not accepted the numbers Polybius gives for the fleets. At this distance we cannot know if Polybius's figures are correct, so the best approach is to broadly accept them.)

When the fleets met, the Carthaginians took the initiative and the battle devolved into three separate conflicts, where the Carthaginians hoped that their superior ship-handling skills would win the day. After a prolonged and confusing day of fighting, the Carthaginians were decisively defeated, losing 30 ships sunk and 64 captured to Roman losses of 24 ships sunk.

== Sources ==
The main source for almost every aspect of the First Punic War (Note: The term Punic comes from the Latin word Punicus (or Poenicus), meaning "Carthaginian", and is a reference to the Carthaginians' Phoenician ancestry.) is the historian Polybius (c. 200 – c. 118 BC), a Greek sent to Rome in 167 BC as a hostage. His works include a now lost manual on military tactics, but he is best known for The Histories, written sometime after 167 BC, or about a century after the Battle of Ecnomus. Polybius's work is considered broadly objective and largely neutral—between Carthaginian and Roman points of view.

Most Carthaginian written records were destroyed along with their capital, Carthage, in 146 BC and so Polybius's account of the First Punic War is based on several, now lost, Greek and Latin sources. Polybius was an analytical historian and wherever possible personally interviewed participants in the events he wrote about. Only the first book of the 40 comprising The Histories deals with this war, but the modern historian G. K. Tipps considers that The Histories contains "an extensive and meticulously detailed account of the Battle of Ecnomus". The accuracy of Polybius's account has been much debated over the past 150 years, but the modern consensus is to accept it largely at face value, and the details of the battle in modern sources are almost entirely based on interpretations of Polybius's account. Other, later, histories of the war exist, but in fragmentary or summary form, and they usually cover military operations on land in more detail than those at sea. Modern historians usually also take into account the later histories of Diodorus Siculus and Dio Cassius, although the classicist Adrian Goldsworthy states that "Polybius's account is usually to be preferred when it differs with any of our other accounts". (Note: Sources other than Polybius are discussed by Bernard Mineo in "Principal Literary Sources for the Punic Wars (apart from Polybius)".) Other sources include inscriptions, archaeological evidence and empirical evidence from reconstructions such as the trireme Olympias.

== Background ==
=== Operations in Sicily ===
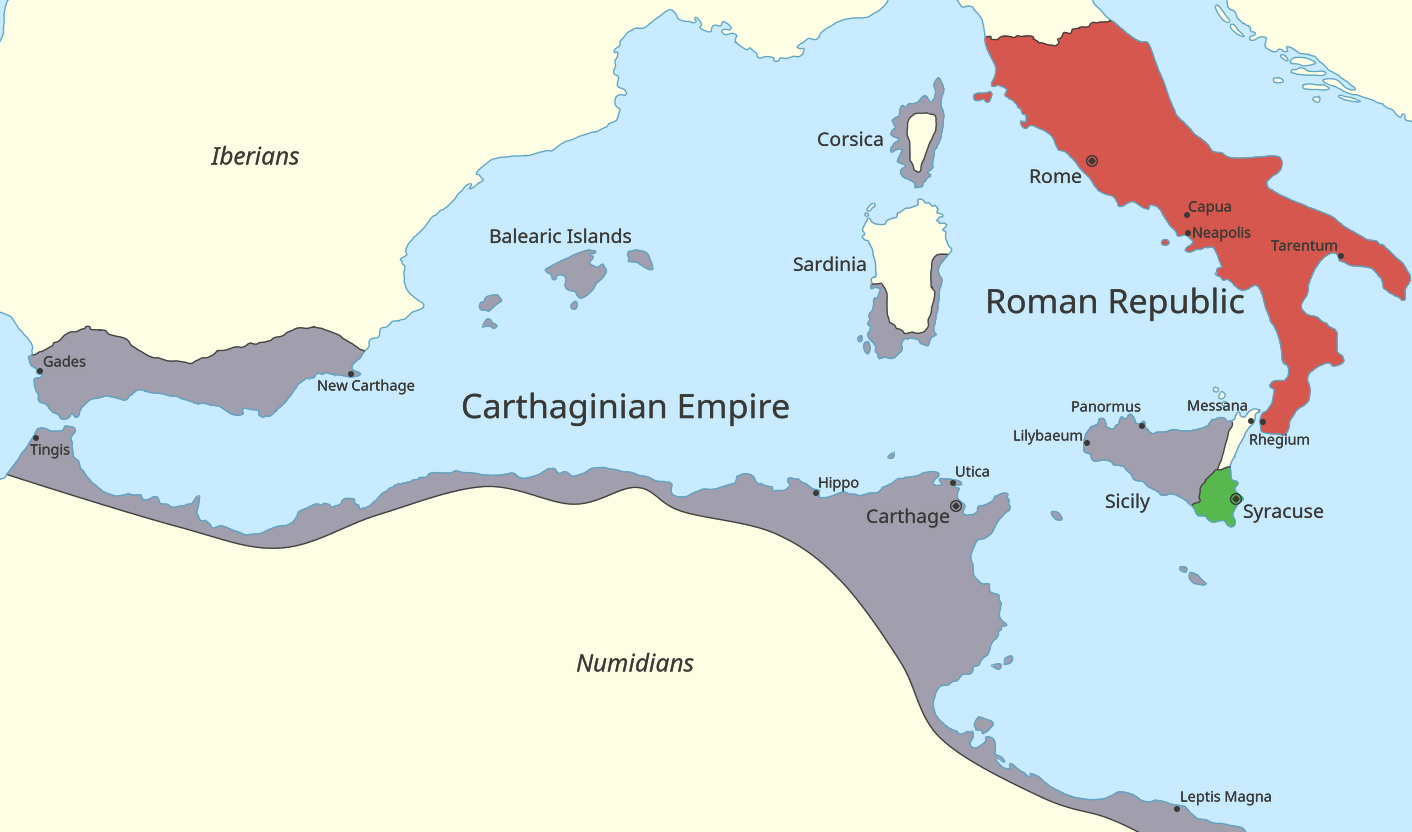
Territory controlled by Rome and Carthage at the start of the First Punic War

In 264 BC, the states of Carthage and Rome went to war, starting the First Punic War. Carthage was a well-established maritime power in the Western Mediterranean; Rome had recently unified mainland Italy south of the Po under its control. The immediate cause of the war was control of the Sicilian town of Messana (modern Messina). More broadly both sides wished to control Syracuse, the most powerful city-state on Sicily. By 256 BC, the war had grown into a struggle in which the Romans were attempting to defeat decisively the Carthaginians and, at a minimum, control the whole of Sicily.

The Carthaginians were engaging in their traditional policy of waiting for their opponents to wear themselves out, in the expectation of then regaining some or all of their possessions and negotiating a mutually satisfactory peace treaty. The Romans were essentially a land-based power and had gained control of most of Sicily. The war there had reached a stalemate, as the Carthaginians focused on defending their well-fortified towns and cities; these were mostly on the coast and so could be supplied and reinforced without the Romans being able to use their superior army to interfere. The focus of the war shifted to the sea, where the Romans had little experience; on the few occasions they had previously felt the need for a naval presence they had relied on small squadrons provided by their allies.

=== Ships ===
During this period the standard warship of the Carthaginian navy was the quinquereme, meaning "five-oared". The quinquereme was a galley, c. 45 metres (150 ft) long, c. 5 metres (16 ft) wide at water level, with its deck standing c. 3 metres (10 ft) above the sea, and displacing around 100 tonnes (110 short tons; 98 long tons). The galley expert John Coates has suggested that they could maintain 7 knots (8.1 mph; 13 km/h) for extended periods. The quinquereme was superior as a warship to the previous mainstay of Mediterranean navies, the trireme, and, being heavier, performed better than the triremes in bad weather. The modern replica galley Olympias has achieved speeds of 8.5 knots (9.8 mph; 15.7 km/h) and cruised at 4 knots (4.6 mph; 7.4 km/h) for hours on end.

Depiction of the position of the rowers in three levels (from top: thranitai, zygitai and thalamitai) in a Greek trireme

The generally accepted theory regarding the arrangement of oarsmen in quinqueremes is that there would be sets – or files – of three oars, one above the other, with two oarsmen on each of the two uppermost oars and one on the lower, for a total of five oarsmen per file. This would be repeated down the side of a galley for a total of 28 files on each side; 168 oars in total. At least one man on each oar would need to have had some experience if the ship was to be handled effectively. Vessels were built as cataphract, or "protected", ships, with a closed hull to protect the rowers, and a full deck able to carry marines and catapults. Carthaginian quinqueremes used a separate "oar box" which contained the rowers and was attached to the main hull. This development meant the rowers would be located above or at deck level, which allowed the hull to be strengthened, and increased carrying capacity; as well as improving the ventilation conditions of the rowers, an important factor in maintaining their stamina, and thereby improving the ship's maintainable speed.

In 260 BC Romans set out to construct a fleet of 100 quinqueremes and 20 triremes. They used a shipwrecked Carthaginian quinquereme as a blueprint for their own. As novice shipwrights, the Romans built copies that were heavier than the Carthaginian vessels, and so slower and less manoeuvrable. The quinquereme provided the workhorse of the Roman and Carthaginian fleets throughout the Punic Wars, although hexaremes (six oarsmen per bank), quadriremes (four oarsmen per bank) and triremes are also occasionally mentioned. So ubiquitous was the type that Polybius uses it as a shorthand for "warship" in general. A quinquereme carried a crew of 300: 280 oarsmen and 20 deck crew and officers; it would also normally carry a complement of 40 marines; if battle was thought to be imminent this would be increased to as many as 120.

=== Naval operations ===
The corvus, the Roman ship boarding device

Getting the oarsmen to row as a unit, let alone to execute the more complex battle manoeuvres, required long and arduous training. As a result, the Romans were initially at a disadvantage against the more experienced Carthaginians. To counter Carthaginian superiority, the Romans introduced the corvus, a bridge 1.2 m (4 ft) wide and 11 m (36 ft) long, with a heavy spike on the underside, which was designed to pierce and anchor into an enemy ship's deck. This allowed Roman legionaries acting as marines to board enemy ships and capture them, rather than employing the previously traditional tactic of ramming. All warships were equipped with rams, a triple set of 60-centimetre-wide (2 ft) bronze blades weighing up to 270 kilograms (600 lb) positioned at the waterline. They were made individually by the lost-wax method to fit immovably to a galley's prow. In the century prior to the Punic Wars, boarding had become increasingly common and ramming had declined, as the larger and heavier vessels adopted in this period lacked the speed and manoeuvrability necessary to ram, while their sturdier construction reduced the ram's effect even in case of a successful attack. The Roman adaptation of the corvus was a progression of this trend and compensated for their initial disadvantage in ship manoeuvring skills. However, the added weight in the prow compromised the ship's manoeuvrability, and in rough sea conditions the corvus became useless.

Largely because of the Romans' use of the corvus, the Carthaginians were defeated in large naval battles at Mylae in 260 BC and Sulci in 257 BC. These victories, and their frustration at the continuing stalemate in Sicily, led the Romans to focus on a sea-based strategy and to develop a plan to invade the Carthaginian heartland in North Africa and threaten their capital, Carthage (close to what is now Tunis), in the hope of a war-winning outcome. Both sides were determined to establish naval supremacy and invested large amounts of money and manpower in maintaining and increasing the size of their navies.

== Prelude ==
The Carthaginian fleet mustered at Carthage in the late spring of 256 BC, before sailing for Lilybaeum (modern Marsala), their major base in Sicily, to resupply and to embark soldiers to use as marines. It then sailed east along the coast of Sicily to Heraclea Minoa, the easternmost of the Sicilian towns the Carthaginians still held and was joined by those ships already operating from Sicily, at least 62 and probably more. These brought the Carthaginian fleet up to 350 ships, nearly all quinqueremes, commanded by Hanno, who had been defeated at Agrigentum six years earlier, and Hamilcar, the victor of the Battle of Thermae (not to be confused with Hamilcar Barca).

The Romans mustered at about the same time, probably at Ostia, the port of Rome. The Roman fleet consisted of 330 warships, the large majority quinqueremes. They were accompanied by an unknown number of transports, mostly carrying the horses of the invasion force. The two consuls for the year, Marcus Atilius Regulus and Lucius Manlius Vulso Longus, were given command of the fleet; each sailed in a hexareme, the only larger ships noted as participating in the battle. The Roman fleet sailed south along the coast of Italy, crossed to Sicily at Messana, and sailed south and then west to the roadstead at Phintias (modern Licata) where they rendezvoused with the Roman army on Sicily. The Roman fleet embarked 80 picked legionaries on each warship, intending to either land them in Africa in pursuit of their strategic objective or to complement the galleys' marines if the Carthaginian navy challenged them.

In total the Roman fleet had 140,000 men on board: rowers, other crew, marines and soldiers. The number of Carthaginians is less certainly known but was estimated by Polybius at 150,000, and most modern historians broadly support this. If these figures are approximately correct, then the Battle of Ecnomus is possibly the largest naval battle of all time, by the number of combatants involved.

Rather than sail directly from Phintias for North Africa, the Romans sailed west, intending to cross the Strait of Sicily at its narrowest point. This would minimise the time the fleet spent in the open sea; ships of the time, especially the less seaworthy galleys, kept in sight of land whenever possible. The Carthaginians were aware of the Roman intentions and correctly anticipated their route. They intercepted the Roman fleet to the east of Heraclea Minoa, after it had left Licata. The fleets are commonly stated to have met off Cape Ecnomus, immediately after the Romans left Licata. However, this is not supported by Polybius, or any other primary source; it is a modern convention. The medieval historian Joannes Zonaras cites Dio Cassius to locate the battle immediately to the east of Heraclea Minoa.

== Battle ==
A series of maps showing the various stages of the battle

The Roman fleet moved along the Sicilian coast in a compact formation. They were deployed in four squadrons, of unequal size. The first two squadrons (I and II) led the way, each arrayed in echelon, together forming a wedge. The squadron on the right was under Vulso and the squadron on the left under Regulus. The consuls' hexaremes sailed alongside each other, at the "point" of the wedge. The third squadron (III) was immediately behind them, towing the transports. The fourth (IV) was in line abreast, protecting the rear. The Carthaginians sailed east, expecting to encounter the Roman fleet, and were possibly warned of its approach by small scout-ships. They were organised in three unequally-sized squadrons, arranged in a single line abreast with their left, landward, wing (1) advanced. The Carthaginian centre (2) was commanded by Hamilcar and their right (3) by Hanno. The fleets sighted each other and both advanced.

As the two leading Roman squadrons, their first and second, made for the middle of the Carthaginian line, Hamilcar staged a feigned retreat with his centre, the Carthaginian second squadron, probably by rowing in reverse, and the consuls pursued. The Roman third squadron, towing the transports, fell behind and a gap opened between the two leading and the two rear Roman squadrons. Both Carthaginian wings advanced on the two rearmost squadrons, by-passing the Roman centre and attempting to attack from the flanks to avoid the corvus boarding mechanism. The Carthaginian landward squadron, the first, attacked the Roman warships towing transports, the Roman third squadron, which had been exposed by the advance of their centre. The Romans cast off their tows to be able to manoeuvre. Hanno's force, to seaward, the Carthaginian third squadron, was composed of the fastest and most manoeuvrable Carthaginian ships and attacked the Roman squadron at the rear of their fleet, their fourth; which was being impeded by the now-drifting transports. Having separated the Roman centre from the two rearmost squadrons, Hamilcar and his ships of the Carthaginian second squadron turned to fight the pursuing Romans. The battle thus devolved into three separate fights.

Modern and ancient historians have both suggested that Hamilcar's retreat was intended to specifically bring this situation about: to break up the compact Roman formation and allow the Carthaginians to use their greater tactical skill to outmanoeuvre the threat of the corvi and ram the Roman ships in their sides or rears. At the time of Ecnomus neither the speed nor manoeuvrability of the Roman ships, nor the skills of their crews, were up to the standards of the Carthaginians. The Romans had become more skilled over the four years since they first built their navy, while the recent large increase in the size of the Carthaginian navy meant many of their crews had little experience. Consequently, the superiority in their ships' manoeuvrability and their crews' seamanship was less than they thought. Furthermore, the solidly built Roman ships were less susceptible to the effect of a successful ramming attack than the Carthaginians had anticipated. The three fights became shapeless brawls, where superior ship handling counted for little. On the other hand, when the Romans were able to employ their corvi and board, they had the advantage of the experienced and heavily armoured legionaries they had embarked to transport to Africa.

The commanders of the Roman third squadron, which had been towing the transports, felt outmatched and retreated to the shore. Despite having started the battle echeloned forward from their main fleet, their opponents, the ships of the Carthaginian first squadron, were unable to cut them off from the coast. Once there, the Roman third squadron took up a defensive position: they halted in shallow water, facing away from land, so that the Carthaginians could only attack their flanks with difficulty, and had to face the Romans' corvi if they attacked from the front. In spite of this, this fight was the one where the Romans were most hard-pressed. The rearmost Roman squadron was also outfought by the Carthaginian's third squadron. It put up a stout resistance, but its situation became desperate.

The battle was decided in the fight between the two fleets' centres – the Roman first and second squadrons fighting the Carthaginian second squadron. Several Roman ships were rammed and sunk, as were several Carthaginian. More Carthaginian ships were boarded and captured. After a long fight the crews of the surviving ships of the Carthaginian centre lost heart and fled. The Roman centre broke off its pursuit in response to the consuls' signals, and rowed back to assist their two rear squadrons, and to rescue the drifting transports. Vulso's first squadron attacked the Carthaginian first squadron. Regulus' second squadron launched an attack against Hanno's third squadron. He approached the Carthaginians from their disengaged side, threatening to trap them against the Roman fourth squadron which they were already fighting. Hanno withdrew with those ships of the Carthaginian third squadron that were able to extricate themselves. Regulus and his Roman second squadron then moved to reinforce Vulso's attack with the Roman first squadron on the last Carthaginian squadron still fighting, the first, which was now surrounded. This was when the Carthaginians suffered their heaviest losses; 50 of their ships, trapped against the shore and heavily outnumbered, surrendered. After a prolonged and confused day of fighting the Carthaginians had been decisively defeated, losing 30 ships sunk and 64 captured to Roman losses of 24 ships sunk. The Carthaginians lost between 30,000 and 40,000 men, the majority captured; Roman casualties were approximately 10,000 killed.

== Aftermath ==
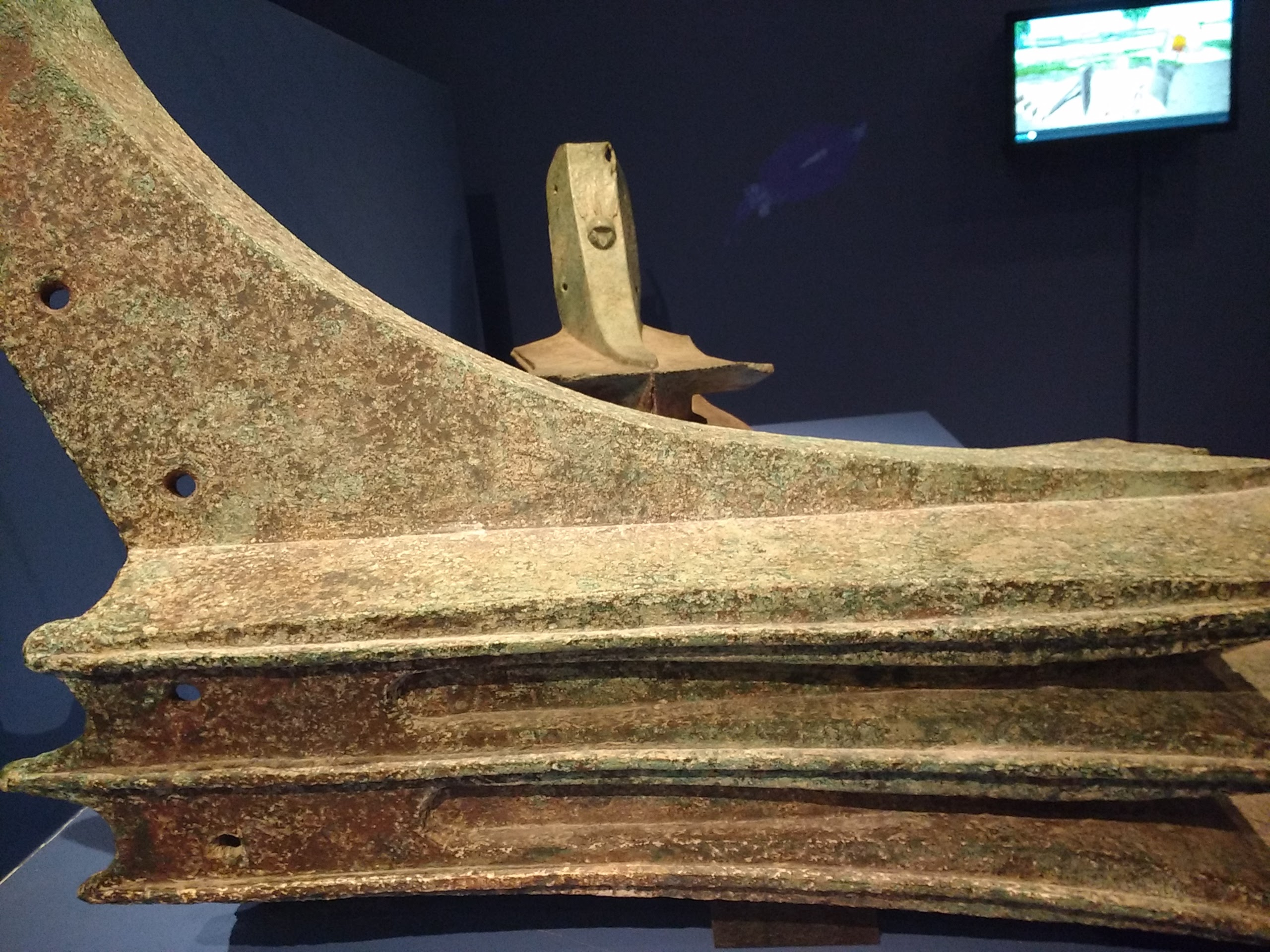
Carthaginian naval ram, c. 240 BC; note the gouges towards the bottom, probably from bow to bow contact with another vessel

Following the battle, the Romans landed in Sicily for repairs, to rest the crews, and to reorganise their forces. The prows of the captured Carthaginian ships were sent to Rome to adorn the speaker's platform of the Forum, according to the tradition initiated after the Battle of Mylae. The Carthaginian fleet fell back to home waters, where it prepared to fight again. Its commanders were unable to predict the Roman landing point and were on the western side of Cape Bon when the Romans under Regulus successfully landed on the east at Aspis (modern Kelibia) and besieged it. Manlius returned to Rome and celebrated a triumph. Hamilcar and 5,500 Carthaginian troops were withdrawn from Sicily to reinforce the Carthaginian army in Africa.

Regulus' invasion initially went well and in 255 BC the Carthaginians sued for peace. The terms proposed by Regulus were so harsh that the Carthaginians fought on, defeating his army. The Romans sent a fleet to evacuate their survivors and the Carthaginians attempted to oppose it. In the resulting Battle of Cape Hermaeum off Africa the Carthaginians were heavily defeated, losing 114 ships captured. The Roman fleet, in turn, was devastated by a storm while returning to Italy, losing 384 ships and 100,000 men. It is possible that the presence of the corvus made the Roman ships much less seaworthy; there is no record of their being used after this disaster.

The war eventually ended in 241 BC with a Roman victory at the Battle of the Aegates Islands, leading to an agreed peace. Henceforth Rome was the leading military power in the western Mediterranean, and increasingly the Mediterranean region as a whole. The immense effort of building 1,000 galleys during the war laid the foundation for Rome's maritime dominance for 600 years.

== Notes, citations and sources ==
=== Sources ===
- Bagnall, Nigel (1999). The Punic Wars: Rome, Carthage and the Struggle for the Mediterranean. London: Pimlico. ISBN 978-0-7126-6608-4.
- Casson, Lionel (1995). Ships and Seamanship in the Ancient World. Baltimore, MD: Johns Hopkins University Press. ISBN 0-8018-5130-0.
- Coates, John F. (2004). "The Naval Architecture and Oar Systems of Ancient Galleys". In Gardiner, Robert (ed.). Age of the Galley: Mediterranean Oared Vessels since Pre-Classical Times. London: Chrysalis. pp. 127–141. ISBN 978-0-85177-955-3.
- Curry, Anne (2012). "The Weapon That Changed History". Archaeology. 65 (1): 32–37. JSTOR 41780760.
- Dart, Christopher J.; Vervaet, Frederik J. (2011). "The Significance of the Naval Triumph in Roman History (260-29 BCE)". Zeitschrift für Papyrologie und Epigraphik. 176. Dr. Rudolf Habelt GmbH: 267–280. JSTOR 41291126.
- Goldsworthy, Adrian (2000). The Fall of Carthage. London: Phoenix. ISBN 978-0-304-36642-2.
- Hau, Lisa Irene (2016). Moral History from Herodotus to Diodorus Siculus. Edinburgh: Edinburgh University Press. ISBN 978-1474411073.
- Hoyos, Dexter (2007). Truceless War: Carthage's Fight for Survival, 241 to 237 BC. Leiden; Boston: Brill. ISBN 978-90-474-2192-4.
- Lazenby, John Francis (1996). The First Punic War: A Military History. Stanford, CA: Stanford University Press. ISBN 978-0-8047-2674-0. (registration required)
- Meijer, Fik (1986). A History of Seafaring in the Classical World. London; Sydney: Croom and Helm. ISBN 978-0-70993-5650.
- Miles, Richard (2011). Carthage Must be Destroyed. New York: Penguin. ISBN 978-0-14-101809-6.
- Mineo, Bernard (2015) [2011]. "Principal Literary Sources for the Punic Wars (apart from Polybius)". In Hoyos, Dexter (ed.). A Companion to the Punic Wars. Chichester, West Sussex: John Wiley & Sons. ISBN 978-1-1190-2550-4.
- Morrison, John S. & Coates, John F. (1996). Greek and Roman Oared Warships. Oxford: Oxbow Books. ISBN 978-1-90018-8074.
- Murray, William M. (2011). The Age of Titans: The Rise and Fall of the Great Hellenistic Navies. Oxford: Oxford University Press. ISBN 978-0-19993-2405.
- Rankov, Boris (2015) [2011]. "A War of Phases: Strategies and Stalemates". In Hoyos, Dexter (ed.). A Companion to the Punic Wars. Oxford: John Wiley & Sons. pp. 149–166. ISBN 978-1-405-17600-2.
- Rodgers, William Ledyard (1937). Greek and Roman Naval Warfare. Annapolis: United States Naval Institute. pp. 278–291. OCLC 800534587.
- Shutt, R.J.H. (1938). "Polybius: A Sketch". Greece & Rome. 8 (22): 50–57. doi:10.1017/S001738350000588X. JSTOR 642112. S2CID 162905667.
- Sidwell, Keith C.; Jones, Peter V. (1998). The World of Rome: an Introduction to Roman Culture. Cambridge: Cambridge University Press. ISBN 978-0-521-38600-5.
- de Souza, Philip (2008). "Naval Forces". In Sabin, Philip; van Wees, Hans & Whitby, Michael (eds.). The Cambridge History of Greek and Roman Warfare, Volume 1: Greece, the Hellenistic World and the Rise of Rome. Cambridge: Cambridge University Press. pp. 357–367. ISBN 978-0-521-85779-6.
- Tipps, G.K. (1985). "The Battle of Ecnomus". Historia: Zeitschrift für Alte Geschichte. 34 (4): 432–465. JSTOR 4435938.
- Walbank, F.W. (1959). "Naval Triaii". The Classical Review. 64 (1): 10–11. doi:10.1017/S0009840X00092258. JSTOR 702509. S2CID 162463877.
- Wallinga, Herman Tammo (1956). The Boarding-Bridge of the Romans. Groningen; Djakarta: J.B. Wolters. OCLC 458845955.
- Warmington, Brian Herbert (1993) [1960]. Carthage. New York: Barnes & Noble, Inc. ISBN 978-1-56619-210-1.
