= Largest naval battle in history =

Disputed title

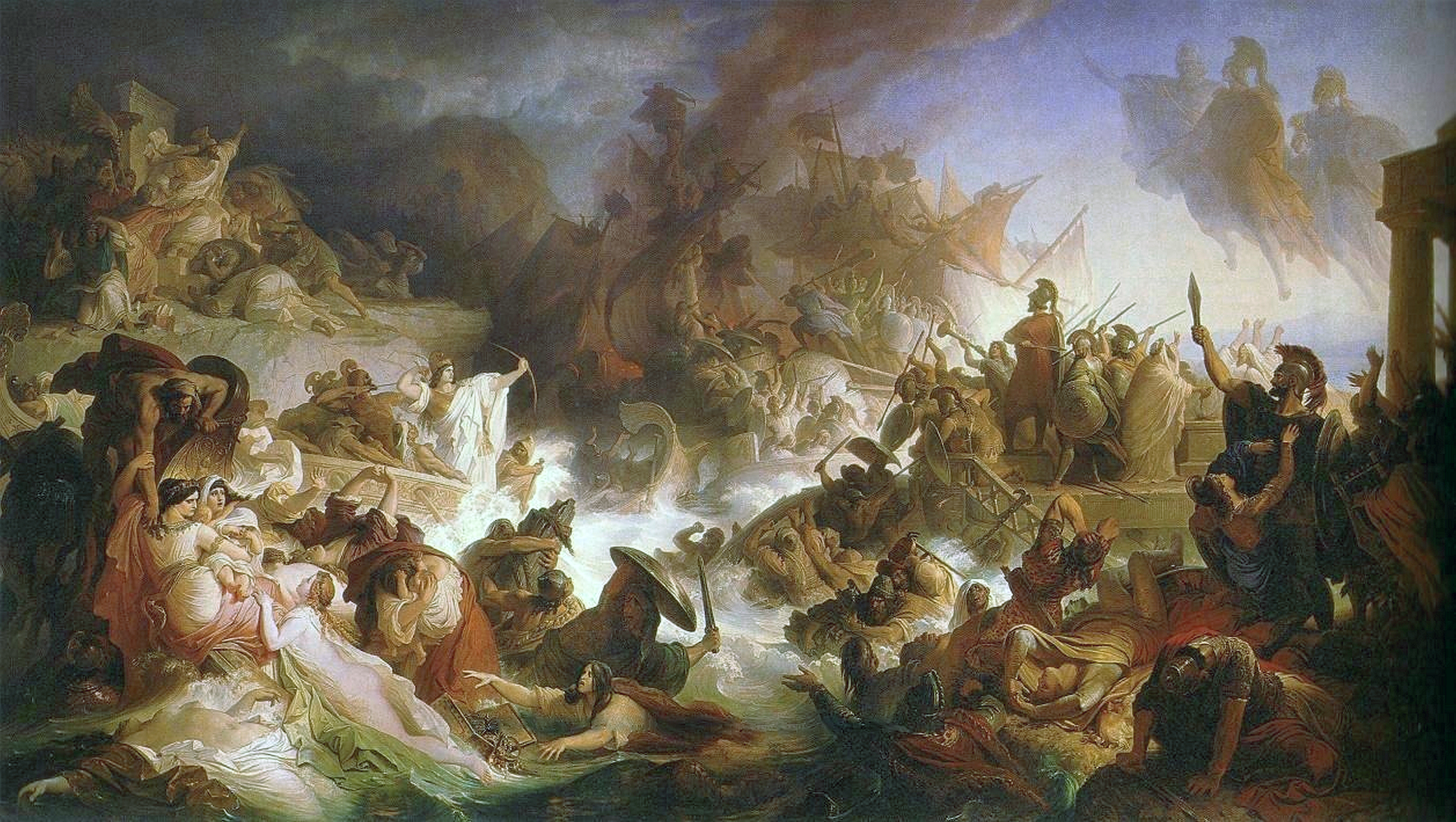
A romantic style painting of the Battle of Salamis by Wilhelm von Kaulbach

The "largest naval battle in history" is a disputed title between adherents of varying criteria which include the numbers of personnel or vessels involved in the naval battle, the total displacement of the vessels involved and sometimes the significance and implications of the battle. While battles fought in modern times are comparatively well-documented, the figures from those in pre-Renaissance era are generally believed by contemporary chroniclers to be exaggerated.

== Helmut Pemsel's evaluation ==
In 1975, the Austrian historian Helmut Pemsel attempted to evaluate naval battles in history by a scoring system. He assigned a score to each of four aspects of a battle as follows:

- Numbers involved (1–4)
- Strategic significance (0–2)
- Tactical execution (0–2)
- Political significance (0–1)

According to him, the largest naval battle ever is the Battle of Leyte Gulf, scoring 8 of a possible 9 points total, while six others tied for second at 7 points each: Salamis, the Aegates, Actium, Barfleur and La Hougue, Trafalgar and Jutland.

== Candidates ==
- Salamis, September 480 BC. A fleet of 371 Greek ships defeated 600–900 Persian ships in this decisive battle off the coast of Athens. The high-end estimate of 1,271 ships involved is the largest number of ships involved in a single battle. Greek triremes typically had crews of about 200 men, and the smaller penteconters were each crewed by 50 oarsmen, yet the total number of personnel involved in the battle is uncertain.
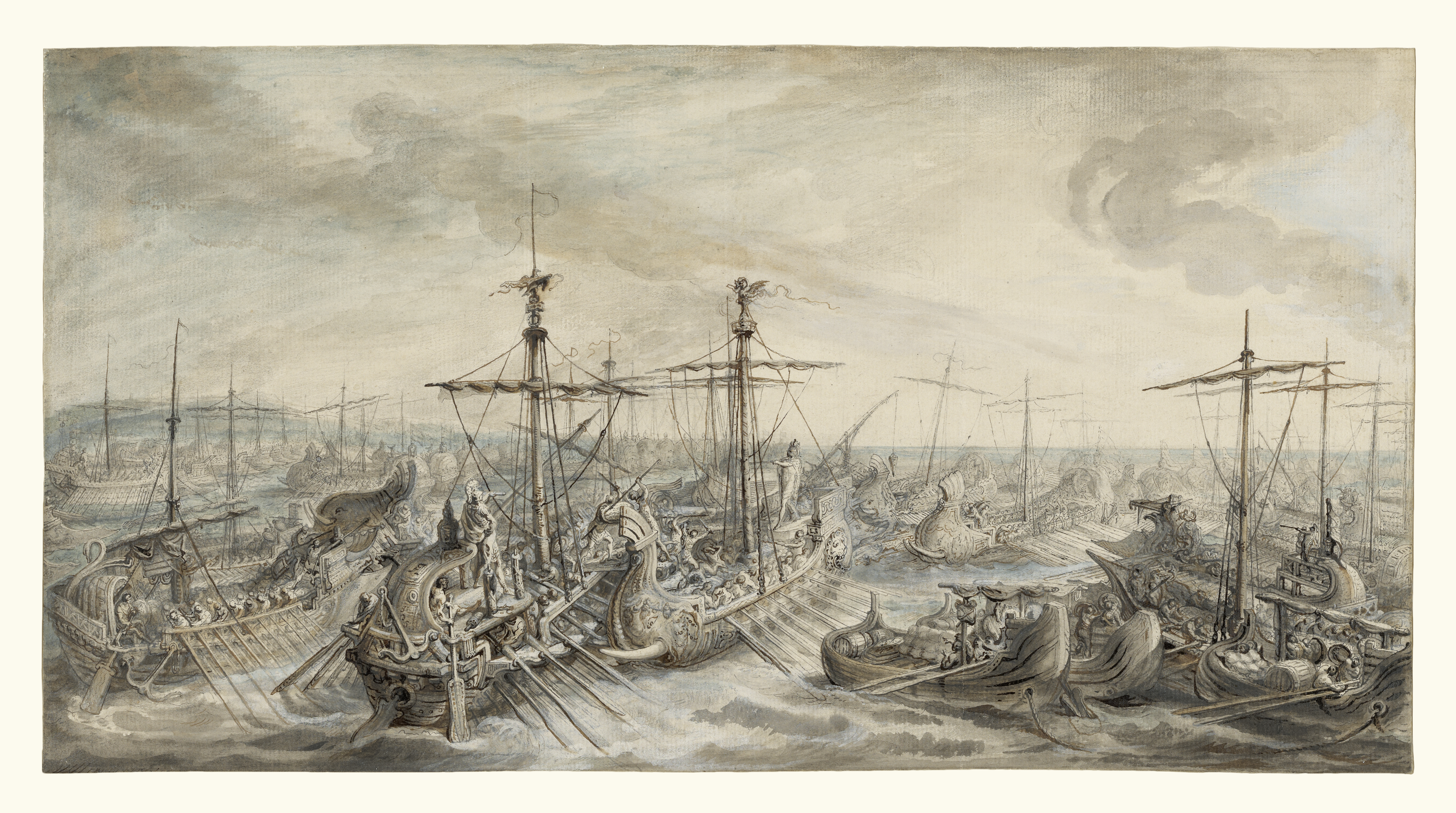
  The Naval Battle Near Ecnomus (256 BC) by Gabriel de Saint-Aubin
- Cape Ecnomus, 256 BC. One of Ancient Rome's first major naval victories over its rival, the city of Carthage, during the First Punic War. In total the Roman fleet had 140,000 men on board: rowers, other crew, marines and soldiers. The number of Carthaginians is less certainly known but was estimated by Polybius at 150,000, and most modern historians broadly support this. If these figures are approximately correct, then this is possibly the largest naval battle of all time, by the number of combatants involved.
- Red Cliffs, winter of 208–209 AD. A decisive battle between the warlord Cao Cao and the warlords Sun Quan, Liu Bei and Liu Qi saw the much smaller allied force of 50,000 defeat Cao Cao's at least 220,000-strong force. The precise estimates of numbers are likely lost to time, but it may be the largest in terms of participants as supported by some sources.
- Yamen, 19 March 1279. This battle completed the Mongol-led Yuan dynasty's conquest of the Southern Song Dynasty. It is claimed that more than 1,000 Song dynasty ships were destroyed by the Yuan dynasty fleet near Yamen, Guangdong, China. This is greater than the low-end estimate of ships involved at the Battle of Salamis; however not all Song ships were warships.
- Lake Poyang, 30 August – 4 October 1363. It is claimed to be the largest naval battle in terms of personnel, with a reported 850,000 sailors and soldiers involved. A Ming dynasty rebel force, said to be 200,000 strong, commanded by Zhu Yuanzhang, met a Han rebel force, claimed to be 650,000 strong, commanded by Chen Youliang, on Lake Poyang, China's largest freshwater lake.
- Jutland, 31 May – 1 June 1916. The Imperial German Navy's High Seas Fleet commanded by Vice-Admiral Reinhard Scheer and the British Grand Fleet under Admiral Sir John Jellicoe engaged in battle near Jutland, Denmark, during World War I. The German fleet consisted of 16 dreadnought and 6 pre-dreadnought battleships, 5 battle cruisers, 11 light cruisers, and 61 fleet torpedo boats, while the British fleet was comprised 28 battleships, 9 battle cruisers, 8 armoured cruisers, 26 light cruisers, 78 destroyers, 1 minelayer, and 1 seaplane carrier. Britain suffered more casualties and lost more ships than Germany but the outcome was a strategic success for the British since it resulted in the successful containment of the German fleet. In terms of total displacement of ships involved, it was the largest surface battle.
- Philippine Sea, 19–20 June 1944. This was the largest aircraft carrier battle in history, involving fifteen American fleet and light carriers, nine Japanese carriers, 170 other warships, and some 1,700 aircraft. In terms of displacement, the U.S. Fifth Fleet's Fast Carrier Task Force (TF 58) is the largest single naval formation ever to give battle.

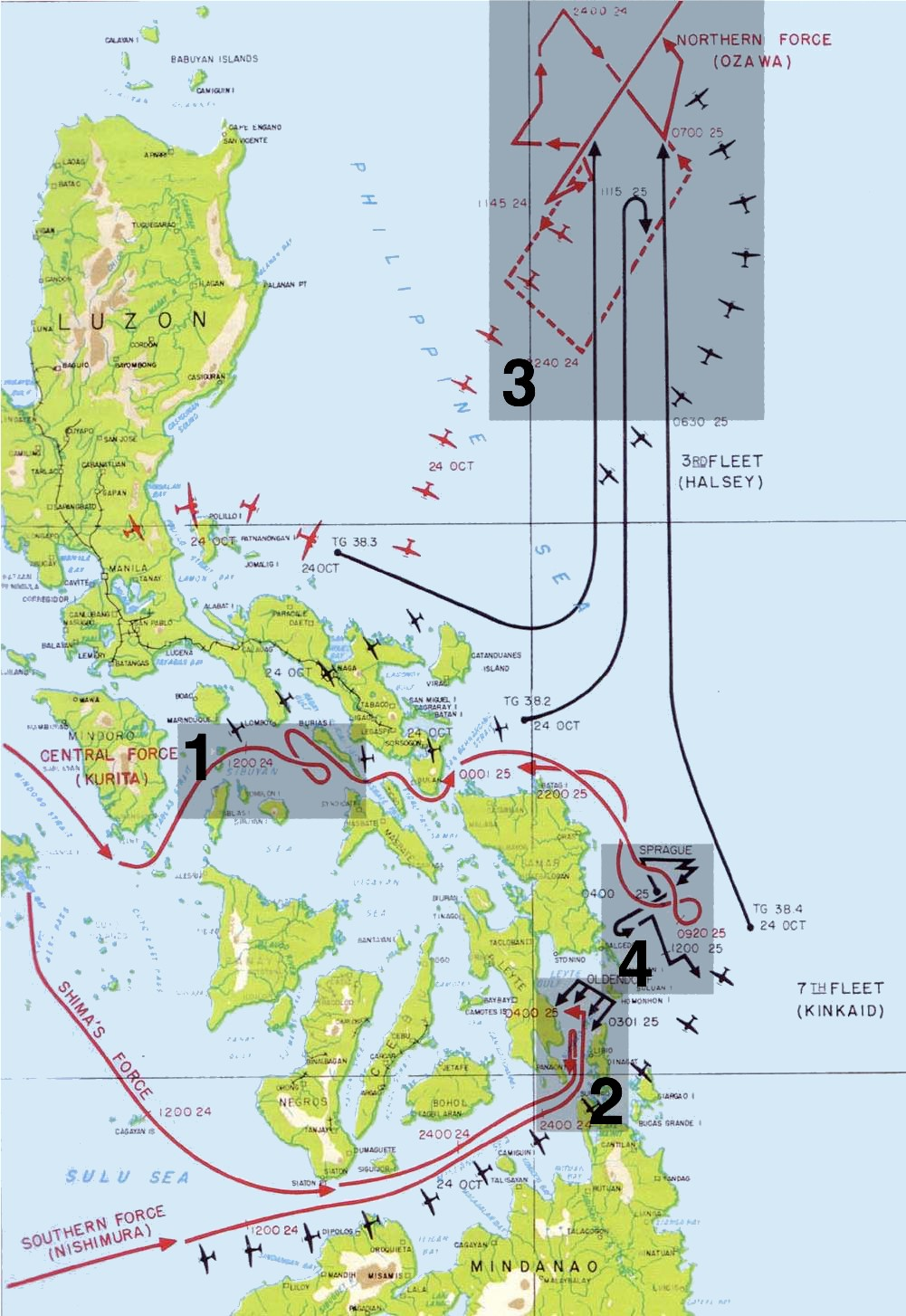
The four main actions in the Battle of Leyte Gulf: 1 Battle of the Sibuyan Sea 2 Battle of Surigao Strait 3 Battle off Cape Engaño 4 Battle off Samar. Leyte Gulf is north of 2 and west of 4. The island of Leyte is west of the gulf.

- Leyte Gulf, 23–26 October 1944. The largest in terms of displacement of ships in the combined orders of battle, if not necessarily in terms of displacement of the ships engaged, was also the largest in terms of the displacement of ships sunk and in terms of the size of the area within which the component battles took place. The United States Third and Seventh Fleets (in total, Task Forces 38, 77, 78, and 79) including some Australian warships, comprised 8 large aircraft carriers, 8 light carriers, 18 escort carriers, 12 battleships, 24 cruisers, 141 destroyers and destroyer escorts, and many other ships, as well as about 1,500 aircraft. The Allies won a decisive victory over Japanese forces, which consisted of 1 large aircraft carrier, 3 light carriers, 9 battleships, 19 cruisers, 34 destroyers, and several hundred aircraft. The opposing fleets carried a combined total of about 200,000 personnel. Leyte Gulf consisted of four major subsidiary battles: the Battle of the Sibuyan Sea, the Battle of Surigao Strait, the Battle off Samar, and the Battle off Cape Engaño, along with other actions. They are counted together by virtue of all being a result of the Japanese operation Sho-Go, which was aimed at destroying the Allied amphibious forces involved in the invasion of Leyte. However, the individual battles were separated by distances as great as two hundred miles, as well as several days' time, from the first submarine action to the Japanese withdrawal.
