= Hamilcar (fortifier of Drepanum) =

Carthaginian general in the First Punic War

Hamilcar (Punic: 𐤇𐤌𐤋𐤊, ḤMLK) was a general who succeeded to the command of the Carthaginians in the First Punic War. He defeated Rome's allies at the Battle of Thermae in 259 BC and killed 4,000–6,000 of them with the help of surprise and good use of military intelligence. He then captured the towns of Enna and Camarina that same year with the assistance of traitors. He was defeated at the Battle of Tyndaris in 257 BC, losing 18 ships and sinking 9 Roman ships. He failed to prevent the Roman landing in Africa, being defeated at the Ecnomus in 256 BC, one of the largest naval battles in antiquity, with the loss of 94 ships, to the Romans' 24. After the Roman invasion of Africa, Hamilcar was recalled by Carthage from Sicily. He was defeated by Marcus Atilius Regulus at the Battle of Adys in 255 BC.

== See also ==
- Other Hamilcars in Carthaginian history
