= Siege of Aspis =

Military investment of the town of Aspis by the Romans during the First Punic War

- Part of the First Punic War
Date	Early 255 BC
Location	Aspis 36°51′N 11°6′E
Result	Roman victory

Belligerents
Roman Republic	Carthage

Commanders and leaders
Marcus Atilius Regulus	Unknown

The siege of Aspis or Clupea was fought in 256 BC between Carthage and the Roman Republic. It was the first fighting on African land during the First Punic War.

== Background ==
After defeating the Carthaginian navy sent to stop them from reaching Africa at the Battle of Cape Ecnomus, the Romans landed close to Aspis, to the south of Carthage.

== Battle ==
The Romans moved to besiege Aspis by building a trench and palisade to defend their ships. Carthage was not yet prepared to fight on land and the city fell after the garrison made a short resistance. By taking Clupea, the Romans controlled the area of land opposite to Carthage and secured their rear in order to scour the enemy before them. The Romans forced Aspis to surrender, and having left in their place a proper garrison, they sent some messengers to Rome to inform them of their success and to receive instructions on the next measures to be pursued. They then decamped with all their forces, and marched through the country to plunder it.

== Aftermath ==
After defeating the Carthaginians, the Romans dispatched most of their fleet back to Rome except for a number of 15,000 infantry and 500 cavalry. The rest of the army, under the command of Marcus Atilius Regulus, remained in North Africa. Advancing inland and plundering the territory along the way, they stopped at the city of Adys. The resulting siege of Adys gave the Carthaginians time to gather an army, only to have that army defeated at the Battle of Adys.
