= Xanthippus (Spartan commander) =

3rd century BC mercenary hired by Carthage

General Xanthippus
- Native name: Ξάνθιππος
- Born: Sparta
- Allegiance: Ancient Carthage (?) Ptolemaic kingdom
- Rank: General (Strategos)
- Conflicts: First Punic War: Battle of Tunis

Xanthippus (Ancient Greek: Ξάνθιππος) of Lacedaemon, or of Carthage, was a Spartan mercenary general employed by Carthage during the First Punic War. He led the Carthaginian army to considerable success, compared to previous failure, against the Roman Republic during the course of the war, training the army to a professional standard before defeating the Romans at the Battle of Tunis, where Carthaginian forces routed the Roman expeditionary force and captured the Roman consul Marcus Atilius Regulus in 255 BC.

Diodorus says that Xanthippus was the leader of a small band of Spartan mercenaries drafted by Carthage during the war. Xanthippus was hired as a Spartan drillmaster by the Carthaginians in 255 BC. Polybius tells us that he first came to the attention of the Carthaginian leaders when he criticized the behaviour of Carthage's generals, arguing that it was they, and not the Romans, who were causing setbacks. Having been summoned to explain himself to Carthage's elite, he successfully argued his case and was placed in command of the Carthaginian army. Despite initial concern amongst the Carthaginians that Xanthippus would not be up to the task, he swiftly proved himself by successfully drilling the Carthaginian army and gained the approval of the soldiery.

Polybius credits Xanthippus with the Carthaginian formation at the Battle of Tunis. He placed the citizen phalanx in the centre of his formation, with the experienced mercenaries holding the right flank. His elephants he placed "a suitable distance" ahead of the phalanx, and his cavalry on his wings supported by more mercenary infantry, where they were able to use their numerical superiority to overwhelm their Roman counterparts and attack the Roman flanks, routing the Roman forces. Having defeated the Roman force in Africa, Polybius says that Xanthippus sailed home for Greece.

Diodorus gives an account of Xanthippus' death. After the Battle of Tunis, Xanthippus stopped in the city of Lilybaeum (now Marsala, Sicily), which was besieged by the Romans. He inspired courage and led an attack defeating the Romans. Jealous of Xanthippus's success, the city betrayed him by giving him a leaky ship, and he supposedly sank in the Adriatic Sea on his voyage home. Scholar John Lazenby argues that this story is completely implausible, a claim supported by a report of a Xanthippus being made governor of a newly acquired province by Ptolemy Euergetes of Egypt in 245 BC. It is supported by Polybius' assertion that Xanthippus returned to Greece rather than stopping in Lilybaeum, a more likely claim as Polybius lived closer to Xanthippus' time than Diodorus, and in terms of general plausibility. Appian, in his African Book, asserts that Xanthippus was sent back to Sparta with honors and warships by the Carthaginians, but that they had the ships' captains toss Xanthippus and his men into the sea.

Silius Italicus writes that Xanthippus was originally from Amyclae in Laconia and that he fathered three sons with a Carthaginian woman named Barce during the First Punic War. Their names were Eumachus, Critias, and Xanthippus, who bore his father's name. The brothers were proud of their Laconian heritage and eager to prove themselves in battle, hoping that after the Second Punic War they might visit their father's homeland. They served in Hannibal's army and were killed at the Battle of the Ticinus. There they fought against three Roman brothers, Virbius, Capys and Albanus, and in a fierce encounter all six warriors slew one another.

== Popular influences ==
- 'Ksanthippos' is the main character in the book Karthago (fi) by Jukka M. Heikkilä. The book tells a fictionalized story of Xanthippus and his role in Carthage's wars.

== Sources ==
- Lazenby, John F. (1996). The First Punic War. London and New York: Routledge. ISBN 9781134214228.
- Goldsworthy, Adrian (2006). The Fall of Carthage. London: Weidenfeld & Nicolson. ISBN 9780304366422.
