= Marcus Atilius Regulus (consul 267 BC) =

Roman general (died 255 BC)

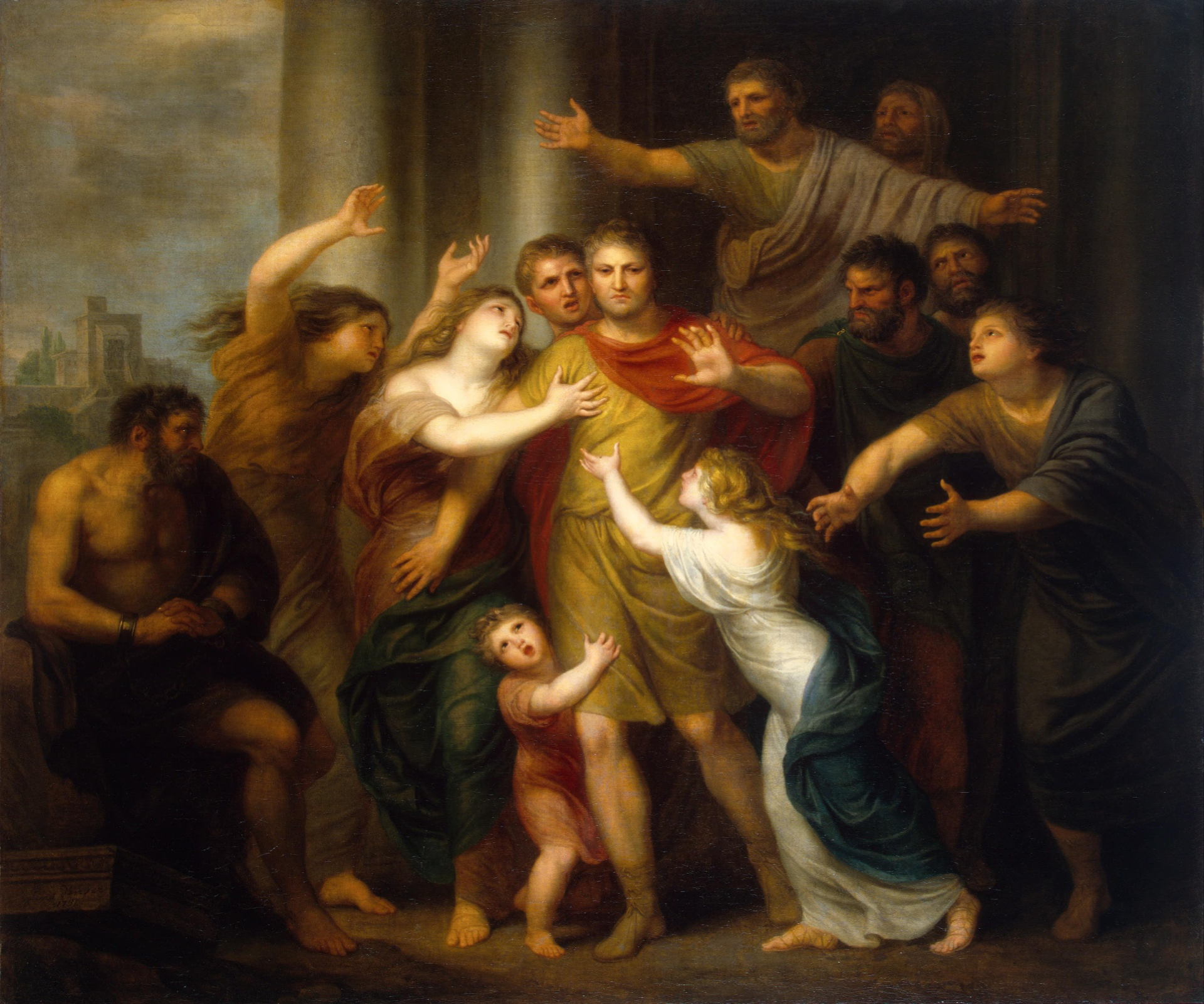
- 1791 painting of Andries Cornelis Lens depicting the myth of Regulus's voluntary return to Carthage, now in the Hermitage Museum.
- Died: Unknown Dungeon, Carthage, Carthaginian Empire
- Occupations: Politician and soldier
- Office: Consul (267, 256 BC)
- Spouse: Marcia
- Children: Marcus Atilius Regulus
- Relatives: Gaius Atilius Regulus (brother)

Military service
- Battles/wars: First Punic War; Battle of Cape Ecnomus; Siege of Aspis; Battle of Adys; Battle of the Bagradas River (255 BC)

Marcus Atilius Regulus (fl. 267 – 255 BC) was a Roman statesman and general who was a consul of the Roman Republic in 267 BC and 256 BC. Much of his career was spent fighting the Carthaginians during the first Punic War. In 256 BC, he and Lucius Manlius Vulso Longus defeated the Carthaginians at the naval battle off Cape Ecnomus; afterwards he led the Roman expedition to Africa but was defeated at the Bagradas River in spring of 255 BC. He was captured and then probably died of natural causes, with the story of his death later being much embellished.

== Life ==
Regulus was first consul in 267 BC. He campaigned with his co-consul (Lucius Julius Libo) against the Sallentini, captured Brundisium, and thence celebrated a double triumph. During the First Punic War, he was elected suffect consul in 256 BC, in place of Quintus Caedicius, who had died in office. With his colleague, Lucius Manlius Vulso Longus, he fought and defeated a large Carthaginian fleet off the coast of Sicily – the Battle of Cape Ecnomus – and the two then invaded North Africa, landing at Aspis on the eastern side of the Cape Bon peninsula.

After the Siege of Aspis, the consuls ravaged the countryside and seized some twenty thousand war captives. Manlius was recalled to Rome and celebrated a naval triumph, while Regulus captured Tunis and entered negotiations with Carthage. While crossing the river Bagradas, his forces supposedly fought an enormous serpent. During the siege of Adys, some 24 kilometres south of Carthage, the Carthaginians attacked over unfavourable hilly ground, triggering the Battle of Adys, which the Romans won. Wintering in Tunis, Regulus engaged in negotiations with the Carthaginians but offered very harsh terms that were rejected; Scullard, in the Cambridge Ancient History, rejects the claims given in Dio that Regulus's terms were so harsh as to "amount to a complete surrender" as "scarcely reliable". Scullard believes that it is more likely that the Romans would have required Carthage to vacate Sicily; the Carthaginians, unwilling to leave the western half of the island, would have refused such a demand.

His command was prorogued into 255 BC. That spring, the Carthaginians, buttressed by the arrival of Spartan mercenaries under Xanthippus and bristling against Regulus's proposals of harsh terms, fought Regulus at the Battle of the Bagradas River. On a plain, which gave the Carthaginians space to utilise their war elephants and cavalry, Regulus was defeated and captured; only some two thousand Romans escaped the battle and were picked up by the Roman navy before being wrecked by a storm. Regulus died of neglect or starvation in captivity, though his fate "was soon embellished by legend".

== Legends of death ==
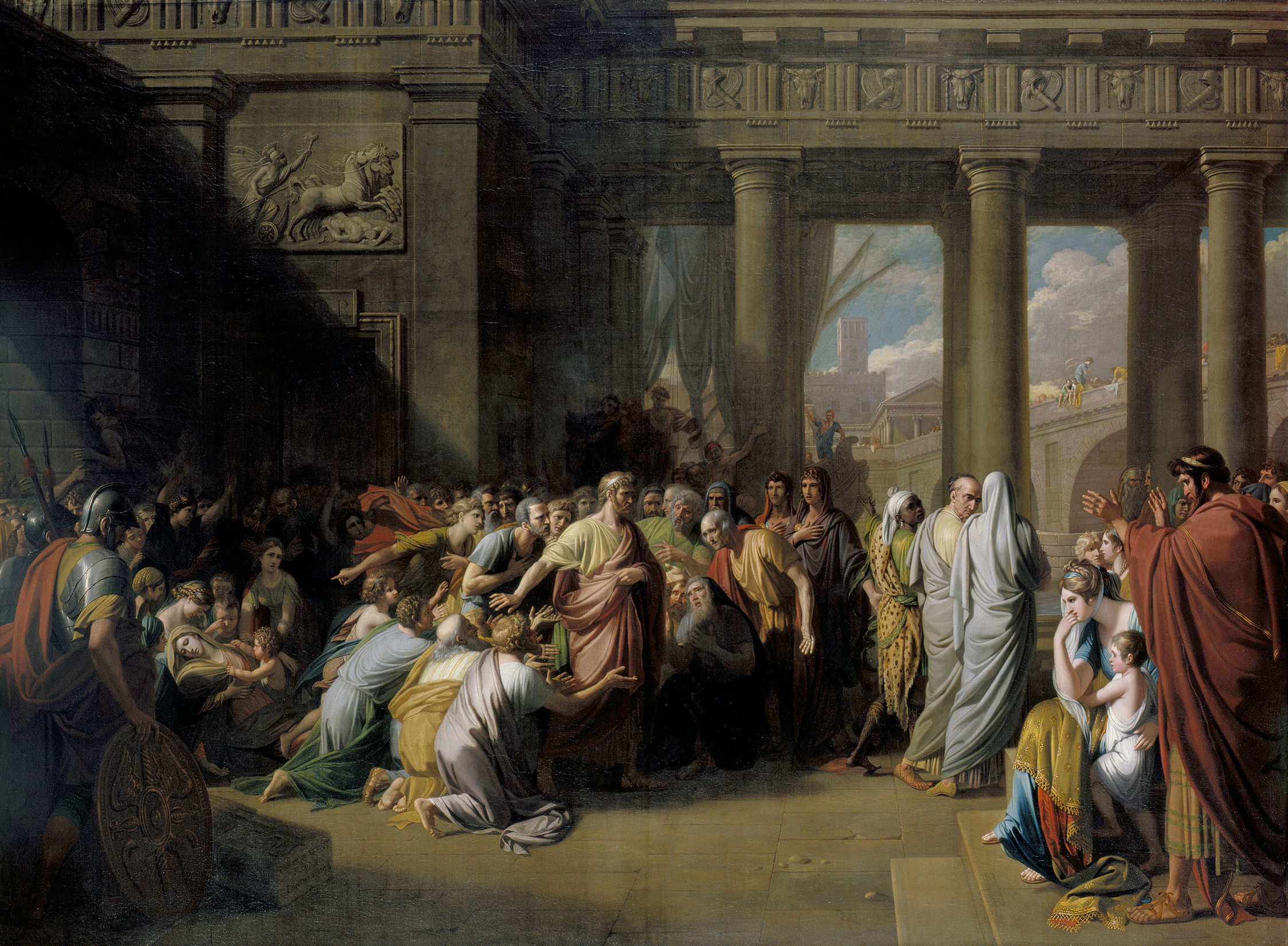
The Departure of Regulus by Benjamin West, 1769.

According to legend, the Carthaginians sent him back to Rome, under oath to return. He was to negotiate for a prisoner exchange or peace terms, but he opposed any such exchange or terms, so he returned to the Carthaginians to be tortured to death. This legend is, however, "almost certainly invented, perhaps to palliate his son's torturing of two Carthaginian prisoners in revenge for his death". No evidence of the legend appears in the best source on the period, Polybius.

The first evidence of the legend emerges with fragments of Gaius Sempronius Tuditanus's history in 129 BC; in this account, the Carthaginians have him starved to death. The legend also appears in Cicero's De Officiis 3.99–115, where it is used as an exemplum of honour before practicality. According to Augustine of Hippo in City of God (5th century AD), using similar wording as Cicero in Pisonem, the Carthaginians "shut [Regulus] up in a narrow box, in which he was compelled to stand, and in which finely sharpened nails were fixed all round about him, so that he could not lean upon any part of it without intense pain".

The myth of Regulus's capture and patriotic defiance later became a favourite tale for Roman children and patriotic story-tellers, developed and polished through the years by Roman historiographers and orators.

== Family ==
The Atilii Reguli were a plebeian family. This Regulus was the brother of the Gaius Atilius Regulus who was consul in 257 and 250 BC. With a wife named Marcia, he had at least one son, also named Marcus Atilius Regulus, who later became consul in 227 and 217 BC before also being elected censor in 214 BC. Klaus Zmeskal, in Adfinitas, includes no linkage between this Regulus and the homonymous consul of 294 BC.

== See also ==
- Cato the Elder
- Cincinnatus
- Horatii
- Publius Decius Mus

== Notes ==
Preceded by Publius Sempronius Sophus; Appius Claudius Russus	Roman consul 267 BC with Lucius Julius Libo	Succeeded by Decimus Junius Pera; Numerius Fabius Pictor
Preceded by Quintus Caedicius	Roman consul 256 BC (suffect) with Lucius Manlius Vulso Longus	Succeeded by Servius Fulvius Paetinus Nobilior; Marcus Aemilius Paullus
