= Maritime power =

Nations with powerful navies

A maritime power (sometimes a naval power) is a nation with a very strong navy, which often is also a great power, or at least a regional power. A maritime power is able to easily control their coast, and exert influence upon both nearby and far countries. A nation that dominates the world navally is known as a maritime superpower. Many countries that become maritime powers become strong to defend themselves from an extant threat, as the Soviet Union did during the Cold War to defend itself from the United States Navy. In that scenario, it is common for the emerging maritime power to focus largely upon area denial tactics, rather than power projection.

Maritime powers are much more involved in global politics and trade than other powers.

== History ==
Its status as an island nation that needed naval protection against Continental European states, Britain's fleet of naval and trade ships had already become several times larger than that of its closest rival before the advent of the Industrial Revolution. Britain maximised the economic advantage of the Industrial Revolution only by using the same naval power to convince or to force other countries to purchase its factory-manufactured goods.

=== Historic maritime powers ===
- The Roman Empire by 30 BC, Roman dominion extended from the Iberian Peninsula to Egypt. Romans controlled the whole Mediterranean Sea and called it Mare Nostrum (Latin: "Our Sea").
- The Republic of Venice dominated trade on the Mediterranean Sea between Europe, North Africa, and the Levant from the High Middle Ages to the beginning of the early modern period. It conquered numerous territories along the Adriatic Sea.
- The Republic of Genoa was one of the most powerful maritime and commercial powers of the Mediterranean and the Black Sea during the Late Middle Ages.
- Hospitaller Malta had some of the fiercest naval forces of the Mediterranean throughout the rule of the Knights of saint John. The Hospitaller Navy and the Maltese corsairs had ships well equipped to tackle even the best ships of the Ottomans and Barbary pirates.
- The Ottoman Empire had one of the strongest navies in the 16th and 17th centuries, particularly dominating the Mediterranean, Aegean Sea and Black Sea. It reached the peak of its power under the command of Admiral Hayreddin Barbarossa.
- The Swedish Empire. The Dominium maris baltici ("Baltic Sea dominion") policy of the Kingdom of Denmark and the Kingdom of Sweden during the late medieval and early modern eras helped lead the Swedish Empire's domination of the Baltic Sea.
- The Portuguese Empire pioneered the Age of Discovery during the 15th. It was the first global sea power and the first global empire. It was also the most powerful empire during the 15th and 16th centuries.
- The Spanish Empire was one of the first global empires and the most powerful empire during the 16th and the first half of the 17th centuries.
- The Dutch Republic held a virtual monopoly in global commerce and trade routes during the second half of 17th century.
- The British Empire was at one point a superpower, alongside being a maritime power (19th century).
- Chile in the 1880s and 1890s. From 1879 to 1881 Chile successfully reduced the Peruvian Navy and blockaded its ports in the naval campaign of the War of the Pacific. With the ship Esmeralda laid down in 1883 Chile was able to lay claim to possessing the most powerful navy in the Americas. In 1885, that ship was deployed to Panama to show the Chilean flag and conduct gunboat diplomacy during an emerging crisis in the region. By annexing Easter Island in 1888, Chile joined the imperial nations in their partition of Oceania.
- Argentina in the 1880s to 1960s.
- The Empire of Japan was the leading Asian maritime power in the 19th and the 20th centuries. By 1920, the Imperial Japanese Navy was the third-largest navy in the world, behind the Royal Navy and the United States Navy.
- The German Empire in 1910, the German high seas fleet was one of the most powerful navy as it built many ships and had the biggest submarine fleet in the world, with 120 submarines in total.
- The Soviet Union traditionally had a strong focus on land, but a period of rapid naval expansion allowed it to dominate its area.
- The Kingdom of Italy had one of the most powerful navies from 1918 to 1945.
- Denmark-Norway had the second largest navy in most of the 18th century and the beginning of the 19th century. Eventually their entire fleet was captured by the British during the bombardement of Copenhagen in 1801 and 1807, however even after losing the Kingdom of Norway Denmark managed to build most of its navy again, and eventually had the 4th largest navy during the 19th century.

== See also ==
- Command of the sea
- Maritime republics
- Naval power
- Thalassocracy

== Notes ==
Nation is a member of the Group of Twenty.
Nation is a member of the Group of Seven.
Nation is a member of BRICS.

=== Bibliography ===
- Tellegen-Couperus, Olga (1993). Short History of Roman Law. Routledge. ISBN 0-415-07251-4.
- Børresen, Jacob (1994). "The seapower of the coastal state". Journal of Strategic Studies. 17 (1). Informa UK Limited: 148–175. doi:10.1080/01402399408437544. ISSN 0140-2390.
