= Suing for peace =

Act by a warring party to initiate the peace process

Suing for peace is an act by a warring party to initiate a peace process.

== Rationales ==
"Suing for", in this older sense of the phrase, means "pleading or petitioning for". Suing for peace is usually initiated by the losing party in an attempt to stave off an unconditional surrender. The nation holding the upper hand may find, in the losing party's offer of making peace, an opportunity for relief from the necessity of having to continue to wage a costly war.

Pressing for peace may sometimes, however, be started by the winning faction as a means to end the war for several reasons, such as if additional conflict would not be in the perceived best interest of the winning party. In that case, demands might be made, or both nations may agree to a "white peace", which is a return to the status quo ante bellum (the prewar situation).

== Examples ==
The First Sino-Japanese War (1 August 1894 – 17 April 1895) was fought between the Qing Dynasty of China and the Empire of Japan, primarily over influence of Korea. After more than six months of unbroken successes by Japanese land and naval forces and the loss of the Chinese port of Weihaiwei, the Qing government sued for peace in February 1895.

The archives abound with attempts to halt World War I, but most attempts were unofficial and of no effect. On 2 December 1916, prior to his coronation later that month, Charles I of Austria took over the title of Supreme Commander of the army from Archduke Frederick. In 1917, he secretly entered into peace negotiations with France. He employed his brother-in-law, Prince Sixtus of Bourbon-Parma, an officer in the Belgian Army, as intermediary. The negotiations of the Sixtus Affair for a sued peace failed.

== See also ==
- Cineas
- Armistice
- Capitulation
- Ceasefire
- Peace treaty
- Surrender
- Unconditional surrender
- War termination
