= Brian Herbert Warmington =

British historian of antiquity (1924–2013)

- Born: 1924
- Died: April 27, 2013 (aged 88–89)
- Occupation(s): British classicist, ancient historian

Brian Herbert Warmington (1924–2013) was a British classicist and ancient historian.

== Early life, education and military service ==
Born in 1924, he was the son of the Classical scholar E. H. Warmington. After he went to the Mill Hill School, he studied Classics and History at Peterhouse, University of Cambridge. He interrupted his studies during World War II and was commissioned as an officer in the Intelligence Corps of the British Army. Warmington (together with some other students of Classics, like Alan Stripp) trained at a Japanese language course at Bedford (United Kingdom) from 31 August 1943 until 18 February 1944. Warmington was then ordered to Australia and worked as one of the first British code-breakers of Japanese coded radio transmissions. After the war, he returned to Cambridge with his Australian wife and earned a 1st class honours degree in Classics and History and won the Thirlwall Prize in 1951.

== Academic career ==
Warmington taught at Bristol University, where he ultimately earned the position of Reader in Ancient History. He was a scholar with wide-ranging interests. His first book was The North African provinces from Diocletian to the Vandal Conquest (published by Cambridge University Press in 1954). He became co-author of the 2nd edition of Henry Parker's A History of the Roman world from AD 138 to 337 (Methuen, 1958). Warmington's Carthage (R. Hale, 1960, later published by Penguin) on the famous early enemy of the Roman Republic was perhaps his most widely-read book, with multiple editions and re-printings, as well as translations in French, German, Italian, and Hungarian. His book Nero: Reality and Legend (Chatto & Windus, 1969) also saw a broad reading public. His Suetonius’ Nero (Bristol University Press, 1977) continues to serve as useful edition of the biography for upper-level Latin courses (and has also gone through several printings). In addition to his interest in the Roman Republic and Empire, he was also interested in the later Roman Empire. He published important articles on Ammianus Marcellinus and Constantine. He was also a generous and helpful guide to younger scholars (and is so thanked in the prefaces and forwards of many scholarly works).

Warmington died on 27 April 2013.

== Selected publications ==
- Brian H. Warmington, The North African provinces from Diocletian to the Vandal Conquest (Cambridge: Cambridge University Press, 1954).
- Brian H. Warmington, "The Career of Romanus, Comes Africae," Byzantinische Zeitschrift 49(1956): 55–66.
- Brian H. Warmington (with Henry Parker), A History of the Roman world from AD 138 to 337, 2nd edition (London: Methuen, 1958).
- Brian H. Warmington, Nero: Reality and Legend (London: Chatto & Windus, 1969).
- Brian H. Warmington (with S. J. Miller), Inscriptions of the Roman Empire, AD 14–117 (London: London Association of Classical Teachers, 1971).
- Brian H. Warmington, “Aspects of Constantinian Propaganda in the Panegyrici Latini,” Transactions of the American Philological Association 104 (1974), 371–84; reprinted in Roger Rees, ed., Latin Panegyric (Oxford: Oxford University Press, 2012), pp. 335–348.
- Brian H. Warmington, “Objectives and strategy in the Persian War of Constantius II,” Limes: Akten des XI Internationalen Limeskongresses (J. Fitz, ed.), pp. 509–520.
- Brian H. Warmington, Suetonius’ Nero (Bristol University Press, 1977) [2nd edition, 1999].
- Brian H. Warmington, "Ammianus Marcellinus and the Lies of Metrodorus," Classical Quarterly n.s. 31 (1981), pp. 464–468.
- Brian H. Warmington, "The Sources of Some Constantinian Documents in Eusebius’ History and Life of Constantine," Studia Patristica 18 (1985), pp. 93–98.
- Brian H. Warmington, "Did Athanasius Write History?," in Christopher Holdsworth and T.P. Wiseman, eds., The Inheritance of Historiography, 350–900 (Liverpool: Liverpool University Press, 1986), pp. 7–16.
- Brian H. Warmington, “The Destruction of Carthage: A Retractatio” Classical Philology 83 (1988), pp. 308–310.
- Brian H. Warmington, “Did Constantine have ‘Religious Advisers’?,” Studia Patristica 19 (1989), pp. 117–129.
- Brian H. Warmington, “Some Constantinian References in Ammianus,” in J. W. Drijvers and D. Hunt, The Late Roman World and Its Historian: Interpreting Ammianus Marcellinus (London and New York: Routledge, 1999), pp. 147–157.
