= John Rich (disambiguation) =

John Rich (born 1974) is an American country musician and one-half of the country duo Big and Rich.

John Rich may also refer to:

- John T. Rich (1841–1926), US congressman from Michigan
- John Rich (director) (1925–2012), American television and film director
- John Rich (producer) (1692–1761), British theatre manager and father of English pantomime
- John Rich (scholar) (20th century), English professor of classics
- John A. Rich, American professor of medicine and civil servant
- John Rich (war correspondent) (1917–2014), American war correspondent for NBC News
- John Hubbard Rich (1876–1954), American illustrator, painter and art educator
