= Defensive imperialism =

Defensive imperialism is a theory of imperialism viewing security as the prime motive of imperialism. The view originated in Roman studies in the late 19th century and is perhaps the oldest of theories explaining Roman imperialism. It is closest to the argument favoured by Romans themselves and their Greek admirers, and continues to have support in the present. According to the most notable critic of the thesis, William Vernon Harris, no other overall theory about Roman imperialism in the Middle Republic has received as much support from historians.

Until the 1970s, it was widely held that the Romans did not have an aggressive, expansionist policy towards the rest of their world. Rather they built their empire in self-defense, or in defense of their allies. Facing powerful neighbours who threatened its security or even existence, Rome responded to ward off the peril. The Roman responses ranged from taking preventive offensive action to taking control of the beaten enemy to preclude a revanche. The Romans repeatedly conquered kings and peoples, but then took no steps towards the consolidation of imperial rule. They were not therefore conscious imperialists and the Roman Empire was irrational rather than a planned outcome.

The theory draws its strength from the apparent inconsistency of Roman foreign policy, the slowness with which their rulers acted (or reacted), and their reluctance to annex territory. In this pattern economic and ideological factors appear secondary at most. Key evidence for the view is derived from Second Punic War, Roman policy towards Greece at least down to 148 BC, and towards the Near East until 66 BC. In the chapter titled "Defensive imperialism", Howard Hayes Scullard claims that in the initial war with Carthage, the first and crucial step in Rome's expansion outside Italy, the primary motive was the defense of Italy from the immediate Carthaginian threat rather than territorial conquest.

According to John Rich, the doctrine originated with Theodor Mommsen in 1877. Later, Tenney Frank, Maurice Holleaux and Ernst Badian added the main components of the view. Beginning with the antithesis of William Harris in 1979, the theory of defensive imperialism has been mostly criticized and interpreted as a justification and apology for imperialism by contemporary Western colonialists. Later, the concept of apology was challenged.

== Harris anti-thesis ==
From the 19th century until the 1970s, defensive imperialism was the preferred theory for many scholars. Harris was not the first critic. In 1967, Robert G. Wesson criticized those readers of Roman classics who are "persuaded that the building of the empire was reluctant self-defense and largely an innocent response to aggression." However, the academic consensus changed only following the sustained critique by Harris in 1979. In 168-146 BC, he writes, as far as Macedonia is concerned, Rome was clearly compelled to act. But with regards to the Achaeans and Carthage, Rome voluntarily initiated annexations. Other motives were primary with security used as justification. In one passage Cicero claims that Rome won world domination by defending its allies, but in other passages writes that Rome fought for the empire. Harris ends his period of study in 70 BC since it is less disputed that later Roman imperialism became aggressive and expansionist, demonstrated most intractably perhaps by Julius Caesar’s Gallic conquests and the emperor Claudius’ invasion of Britain. Both lands did not pose a threat.

Harris’s anti-thesis was accorded the unique distinction of receiving two reviews in successive issues of the Journal of Roman Studies, by Adrian N. Sherwin-White (1980) and John A. North (1981). North supports Harris' view, stressing that Rome was a militarist society and its wars were often aggressive in intention, even if not formally so. However, North finds the project of proving Rome the aggressor in every case hopeless and, in agreement with Sherwin White, finds such a generalization strained. At best the criticism works only in part. It depends on a Rome-hostile interpretation of what did not constitute a threat to Rome. Harris saw economic motives such as plunder and taxation as the primary ones. However, except for Macedonia, no revenues were extracted in states subdued between 200 and 148 BC. The view of ever aggressive, plundering Rome is incompatible with the state famous for its fides and strong support of its friends and allies. Such a reputation has to be maintained as well as earned.

Harris omitted the Pyrrhic War and the alliance between Philip V of Macedon and Hannibal. Because there were no wars in the Asiatic East for a century after the Battle of Magnesia, Harris does not discuss the relevant theme of Roman diplomacy in Anatolia, except for a brief note on Mithridates. He maintains the Polybian doctrine that the Romans aimed at world domination from their victory in the First Punic War onwards, but when Polybius proposes less aggressive explanations of particular wars, his evidence is regularly rejected. Polybius’ explanation of the outbreak of the Third Macedonian War is also summarily dismissed without supporting argumentation. According to Sherwin White and Paul Burton, Harris cherry-picked both events and sources.

Two more major responses to Harris appeared in 1984 by Erich Gruen and A. N. Sherwin-White. Both books focus on the expansion of Roman power in the East, and argue that Rome was, for the most part, a passive, reactive, and remote hegemon. Focusing on the Mithridatic Wars, Gruen shows that Roman imperialism was overwhelmingly defensive. The theory of sheer aggression and militarism is too simplistic for Greece and the East.

Gruen's student, Arthur M. Eckstein, continued the traditional defensive concept. Despite the "shocking" scale and "savagery" of the Mithridates massacre, Mithridates was left on the throne and allowed to initiate two more anti-Roman wars. The Senate was defensive, the generals sometimes aggressive, expansionist and glory-seeking, but they were under the control of the Senate until the first century BC. Following the defeat of Philip V of Macedon, the Romans withdrew all their troops from Greece and declared Greek freedom. This involved freedom from interference and tribute, troop withdrawal, and each city preserving its ancestral laws. This order became the Roman modus operandi in the world east of Italy: launch a massive attack, then withdraw all troops and personnel, leaving behind a sphere of influence. Eckstein called it "smash and leave." This interstate structure for him does not even qualify as empire, much less aggressive empire.

Harris, however, convinced Eckstein's student, Paul J. Burton, that the Roman attitude toward war and its associated rewards and honors was overwhelmingly positive. Often enough the cause of war was national pride, prestige, honor, and status, as well as individual glory-seeking, and only occasionally Rome waged wars in self defense. At the same time, Rome did not use every opportunity to expand and showed much self-constraint. He presents numerous cases for aggression and injustice on the one hand and restraint on the other. Roman policy was both defensive and aggressive, at different times and for different purposes. Hence, the "old Manichean division of Roman imperial behavior into defensive and aggressive categories...should now properly be regarded as an intellectual dead end." Following this conclusion, Burton presented a view of Roman imperialism less aggressive than Eckstein's. He argues that constructivism rather than realism best explains Roman foreign policy, and that Roman "friendship" (amicitia) was true friendship rather than a euphemism for patron-client relations.

During the four decades following the appearance of Harris’ book (1979), many critics have demonstrated that his thesis is a "classic case of overcorrection." Other Mediterranean states were not less, and often more, aggressive. Eckstein writes that the environment was an "exceptionally cruel inter-state anarchy." In one of the earliest reviews of Harris, John Briscoe pointed out that Philip V of Macedon and Antiochus III initiated more unprovoked wars. Roman exceptionalism, for Eckstein, lay in the self-imposed constraints on aggressions and expansions. Paul Burton concludes that Rome's militarism was assertive rather than defensive or aggressive, like those of other contemporary states in the region. Harris stresses that in the Second Punic War the Roman Senate set about the war with immense zeal and all available forces. According to Sherwine-White, doing so against Hannibal, bent on destroying Rome, does not make the Senate the war-monger any more than Churchill.

== Postcolonial perspective ==
In 1984, Jerzy Linderski stressed that the colonialist West is the intellectual background of the defensive imperialism thesis and the thesis reflects its imperialist perspective. With the ascendance of postcolonial studies, imperialism was stripped of anything defensive and re-defined as exclusively aggressive. The criticism of defensive imperialism evolved into the contemporary assertion that the view represents an "apologist approach" tied to conscious or subconscious support for Western imperialism. By the 1990s, observed William S. Hanson, apologist notions of accidental or defensive imperialism were mostly replaced by persistent expansionist ideology favouring Roman conquests.

A later criticism of defensive imperialism was presented by Andrew Erskine and reviewed by Michael P. Fronda. Giving a few ancient passages (e.g. from Cicero, Caesar) that present Roman wars as necessary to secure peace or protect allies, Erskine dismisses them as "the language of justification rather than explanation." In his survey of modern proponents of defensive imperialism, all primary sources are dismissed and the tone of the section strongly suggests that all of them are simply wrong. Meanwhile, the factors of glory and wealth are laid out in much greater detail and tied to numerous ancient passages.

In 2008, historian Eric Adler presented wide evidence that the argument of imperialist apology fails an analytical test. Most of the proponents of empire in Britain and most of the interventionists in the United States who refer to Rome distance themselves from their Roman predecessor by describing Rome as an aggressive, expansionist empire. On the other hand, equating Britain or the United States with Rome has been an argumentative strategy most fully employed by anti-imperialists and isolationists. The "apologist" label, Adler concludes, rests on intuition rather than evidence. Moreover, with few exceptions, those scholars whose views are linked to "defensive imperialism" do not even discuss modern politics in any detail.

Among exceptions to Adler's generalization is the above-mentioned Robert G. Wesson who criticized Roman defensive imperialism theory a dozen years before Harris. Wesson's case is anti-imperialism combined with parallels between past universal empires, including Rome, and, implicitly, the United States. Expecting a world empire, he devoted 500 pages to describing how horrible all universal empires were and warned of the rise of a world empire under the traditional falsehood of defense:

It is easy to predict that the next stage of history might be a world empire. If any state glimpses an opportunity to do so, it cannot fail to claim world hegemony in the name of its own security and the safety of mankind... Some power might even feel impelled to risk destruction for the sake of bringing about millennial peace instead of nuclear dangers.

John Rich writes that following Harris, defensive imperialism became "the paradox that can no longer be sustained" and offered his synthesis: Roman warfare and imperialism were complex phenomena, for which no monocausal explanation will be adequate. Any attempt to provide a more satisfactory account must combine several factors including the defensive. However, "the paradox that can no longer be sustained" is the postcolonial perspective rather than the view of Harris. The synthesis of Rich is essentially in agreement with Harris who sought to "reduce the importance of defensive imperialism to its proper level, thus making room for the other factors in Rome’s drive to expand."

In 1981, North emphasized the possibility created by the defensive imperialism theory of effective comparison between Rome and other empires. Before the thesis was applied to other empires, the postcolonial perspective demolished the thesis for Rome itself. Arthur Eckstein noted that following Harris, heavy moralizing and rhetorical bitterness overshadow detailed historical analyses. Yet, at least one historian attempted the suggested comparison. Max Ostrovsky described the theory of Roman aggressive imperialism as "post-Colonial folklore rather than science" and in a chapter, titled "Defensive imperialism," argued that, in addition to Rome, it is also applicable to the Qin state before its universal conquest and the United States since 1941.

== Related terms ==
The introduction to 2002's "National Security Strategy of the United States of America justified greater interventionism as self defense:

The greater the threat, the greater is the risk of inaction and the more compelling the case for taking anticipatory action to defend ourselves, even if uncertainty remains as to the time and place of the enemy's attack. To forestall or prevent such hostile acts by our adversaries, the United States will, if necessary, act preemptively... [In] an age where the enemies of civilization openly and actively seek the world's most destructive technologies, the United States cannot remain idle while dangers gather.

Named as the most explicitly imperial doctrine in American foreign relations since the 1904 Roosevelt Corollary, the doctrine of preemption unleashed an avalanche of literature on the "American Empire". Despite this seemingly fertile ground, defensive imperialism received no further development. Besides the postcolonial background, the slogan fits neither advocates, nor critics of US foreign policy. Advocates are unhappy with "imperialism" and critics with "defensive".

Nevertheless, several related terms appeared in these works. The United States was described as an "accidental" or "reluctant" empire, implying that the United States has only been drawn into quarrels of others’ making. In 2003, Paul Kennedy recalled a former student urging that once we have reached Baghdad we should turn smart right and head for Tehran. Kennedy asked: "is that reluctance?" It remains disputed whether it is "reluctance", but in 2025 six B-2 headed for Iran "to eliminate a threat" along the perfect definition of defensive imperialism.

Meanwhile, the majority of Americans traditionally continue to believe in non-interventionism of the new America First version. John Robert Seeley wrote his famous phrase in The Expansion of England: "We seem to have conquered and peopled half the world in a fit of absence of mind." Similarly Robert Kagan described a popular American self-image: "It is as if it were all an accident or an odd twist of fate" that "the United States has risen to a position of global hegemony." In this variant of defensive imperialism the United States rose to global hegemony responding to external attacks or perceived threats. The implication of both Seeley and Kagan, according to Thomas Harrison, was that each nation pursued imperialism subconsciously and must "wake up" and do the same consciously.

People did not "wake up" but the phenomenon of imperialism evolves without consciousness of the masses or rational long-range planning. Indeed, one implication raised by the defensive imperialism theory is that such imperialism is driven by structural or evolutionary rather than conscious factors. "With some exceptions, empires are seldom planned, but happen through combinations of circumstances." Long range policy-making—a plan of world conquest—was simply unavailable to the Romans and any ancient society. Even most notable critics of the defensive theory, like Harris, do not imply that there was "planning of strategy over long periods." No ancient state was equipped for such strategy and little long-term planning lay behind even the most vigorous imperialisms of the 19th century. The only existing strong and direct evidence is of Rome's continuing drive to expand. North was left puzzled "what exactly was that drive" and what forces were at work. Two millennia ago, Polybius (1:4:1) offered his evolutionary explanation: "Fortune has gained almost all the affairs of the world in one direction and has forced them to incline towards one and the same end."

Pacifist philosopher Immanuel Kant expressed a similar thought, using "Nature" instead of what Polybius called "Fortune." In the "mechanical" natural course, he says, the endpoint is "a harmony among men, against their will, and indeed through their discord." The predetermined "course of Nature" leads to this "objective final end of the human race." Half a century later, Kant's compatriot, Alexander von Humboldt, observing the growth of empires in both hemispheres, supposed an irrational nature of the phenomenon: "Men of great and strong minds, as well as whole nations, acted under the influence of one idea, the purity of which was, however, utterly unknown to them."

Another half a century later, their another compatriot, Oswald Spengler, known as a Western declinist rather than Western imperialist, drew a defensive, "unconscious" characteristic of Roman imperialism. Hannibal was probably the only man of his time who clearly saw the trend of events. With this probable exception, the significance of current events was ignored by all, the Romans themselves not excepted. All in vain Scipio Africanus sought thereafter to avoid all conquest. The Second Macedonian War was fought against the will of every party, merely in order that the East could thenceforth be ignored as harmless. Spengler sums up:

Imperialism is so necessary a product of any Civilization that when a people refuses to assume the role of master, it is seized and pushed into it. The Roman Empire was not conquered — the orbis terrarum condensed itself into that form and forced the Romans to give it their name... The way from Alexander to Caesar is unambiguous and unavoidable, and the strongest nation of any and every culture, consciously or unconsciously, willing or unwilling, has had to tread it. From the rigor of these facts there is no refuge.
