= John A. Rich =

American scientist

- Education: Dartmouth College; Duke University School of Medicine; Harvard School of Public Health
- Awards: MacArthur Fellow
- Scientific career
- Workplaces: Boston University; Drexel University; Boston Public Health Commission

John Armand Rich is Professor and chair of the Department of Health Management and Policy at Drexel University in Philadelphia, Pennsylvania, and was a 2006 MacArthur Fellow.

== Early life ==
Rich, originally from Queens, New York City, received an A.B. in 1980 from Dartmouth College his M.D. in 1984 from Duke University School of Medicine, and an M.P.H. in 1990 from the Harvard School of Public Health. He did his internship and residency at Massachusetts General Hospital in Boston.

== Career ==
In the 1990s Rich worked at Boston City Hospital as a primary care physician. In 1993, he established the Young Men's Health Clinic in Boston aimed at young men who were victims of urban violence. His work there has been published in journal papers and elsewhere. In addition to the Young Men's Health Clinic he initiated the Men's Health CREW. The Men's Health CREW is a community health-worker training program for young men of color. His book, Wrong Place, Wrong Time: Trauma and Violence in the Lives of Young Black Men was published in late 2009 by the Johns Hopkins University Press.

He was the Boston Public Health Commission's medical director from 1998 to 2005. Since then Rich has been the Director of Drexel's Center for Academic Public Health Practice. Before coming to Drexel, he was associate professor of medicine and of public health at Boston University.

In 2007, he received an honorary Doctor of Science from Dartmouth College. He has been featured in the 2001 documentary film "The Angry Heart", produced by Jay Fedigan.

Rich is the Director and Founder of the Center for Nonviolence and Social Justice at the Drexel University School of Public Health. Rich served as a member of the Board of Trustees of Dartmouth College from 2008 to 2016.

== Awards ==
In 2006 he was awarded the MacArthur Fellowship in honor of his design for "new models of health care that stretch across the boundaries of public health, education, social service, and justice systems to engage young men in caring for themselves and their peers."

Other Awards:

- President's Award from the Whittier Street Health Center
- Healthy Hero Award from Roxbury Community College
- William A. Hinton Award from the Massachusetts Department of Public Health
