= Frederica Williams =

American health administrator

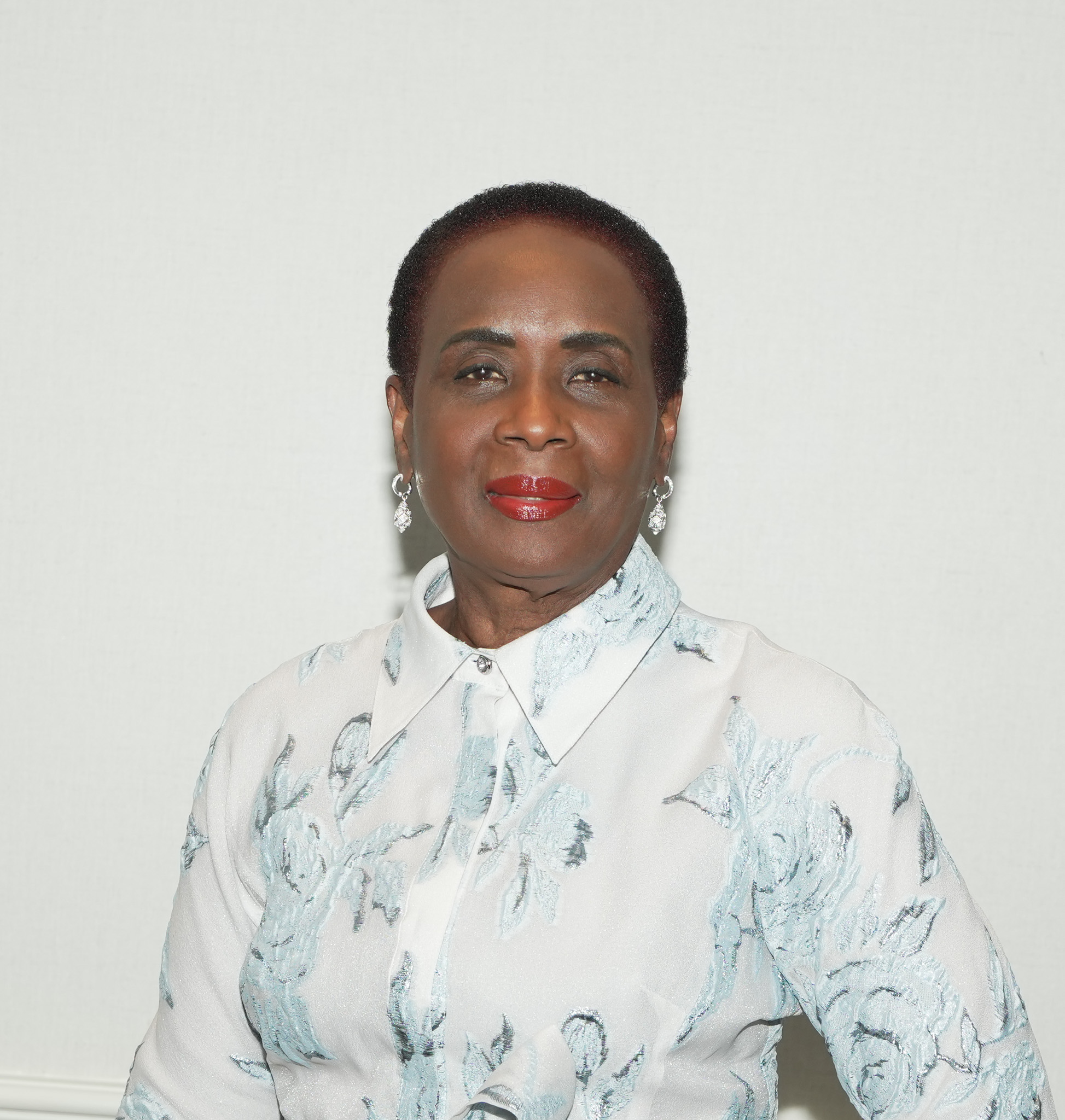

Frederica M. Williams is a Sierra Leonean health administrator who has served as the president and chief executive officer of Whittier Street Health Center in Boston, Massachusetts since 2002.

== Early life and education ==
Frederica Williams was born in Freetown, Sierra Leone. Her family belong to the Creole ethnic group in Sierra Leone.

Williams attended the London School of Accountancy. She obtained a graduate certificate in administration and management from Harvard Extension School and a Master in Business Administration with a concentration in finance from Anna Maria College in Paxton, Massachusetts.

== Career ==
Williams moved from London to Boston in 1984 and worked at various hospitals until joining Whittier Street Health Center in February 2002 as its president and chief executive officer. Since Williams began at Whittier, the number of people served increased from 5,000 to 25,000 in 2012, and was close to 30,000 in 2018.

In 2018, Williams was honored by the WSHC Board of Directors who named the building "Frederica M. Williams Building". On December 6, 2019, the Patriot Vanguard of Sierra Leone recognized Williams for her life mission, business and social justice leadership.

In April 2020, former Mayor Marty Walsh appointed a group of BIPOC leaders to join the COVID-19 Health Inequities Task Force. Williams was one of the leaders tasked with developing strategies to address racism as a public health issue and recommendations to promote health equity and social justice. In December 2020, Williams was recognized for her efforts in addressing social justice and health equity, especially in times of crises during the COVID-19 pandemic. Under her leadership, Whittier Street Health Center expanded its range of services to include Mobile Health Services to remove barriers to care such as transportation, location, access and hours of work for essential workers.

On February 20, 2021, Williams launched scholarship funds to educate young children in Freetown, Sierra Leone. In March 2021, Williams headed the public health sub-committee of the project guiding Kim Janey's then-expected transition into the position of acting mayor of Boston. On June 21, 2021, she led the 21st Annual Men's Health Summit to highlight the high mortality rates of men, especially men of color.

On May 24, 2022, Williams was named the recipient of the 2022 Dean Michael Shinagel Award for Service to Others from the Harvard Extension Alumni Association.

Williams was named the recipient of the 2023 Joan Wallace Leadership Award. In May 2026, Williams appeared on WCVB's CityLine, where she discussed health disparities in Roxbury, Whittier Street Health Center's efforts to address them, and the center's 2026 Men's Health Summit. For National Black Business Month (August 2023), the Boston Globe highlighted Black leaders in Boston, including Williams.

== Memberships ==
Williams is a trustee of Eversource Energy (formerly Northeast Utilities), New England's largest energy provider in Connecticut, Massachusetts, and New Hampshire. She is also a member of the board of trustees for Dana–Farber Cancer Institute, the Massachusetts League of Community Health Centers, Boston HealthNet, Women Business Leaders in Health Care, the Massachusetts Women's Forum, and the International Women's Forum.
