= Arthur Eckstein =

American historian

Arthur M. Eckstein is an American historian and writer who is Distinguished Professor of History at the University of Maryland-College Park. Eckstein's main area of focus is Roman imperial expansion; one reviewer described him as "one of the world’s foremost scholars on Roman imperialism in the middle republican period." In his 2006 book Mediterranean Anarchy, Interstate War, and the Rise of Rome he applies a realist theoretical framework to the ancient Mediterranean, arguing that while the Roman Empire behaved aggressively, it was not exceptional when compared to its neighbors.

Eckstein has also written on a variety of topics outside of classical history, including Vladimir Lenin, George Orwell, and the Hollywood Ten. In 2004 he co-edited a volume of essays on John Ford's The Searchers. In 2016, he published a book on the Weather Underground, Bad Moon Rising: How the Weather Underground Beat the FBI and Lost the Revolution. This book relies in part on FBI files released in the course of FBI agent Mark Felt's 1980 trial for authorizing illegal investigation methods. Eckstein argues that the group's leadership was aware of plans (averted by the 1970 Greenwich Village townhouse explosion) to attack a noncommissioned officers' dance at Fort Dix, contrary to claims made by Bill Ayers in later years. He also describes circumstantial evidence tying Ayers and his wife Bernardine Dohrn to the 1970 San Francisco Police Department Park Station bombing. However, he casts doubt on claims made by Presidents Nixon and Reagan that the Weathermen were helped by foreign governments. Eckstein also writes that the FBI instructed its informants within SDS to vote with the Weatherman faction at the 1969 convention where they took over the organization. Ron Radosh praised the findings drawn from Felt's trial records as "revelatory", but criticized Eckstein for drawing moral equivalences between the Weathermen and the FBI. Harvey Blume praised the book for unearthing new findings and settling old arguments on a topic that had already been written about extensively. Beverly Gage (writing in The Chronicle of Higher Education) wrote that the book showed how intertwined the history of the New Left was with that of the FBI, and that "there is no separating law enforcement from politics".

== Bibliography ==
- Senate and General: Individual Decision-Making and Roman Foreign Relations, 264-194 B.C. (1987)
- Mediterranean Anarchy, Interstate War, and the Rise of Rome. University of California Press, 2006.
- Rome Enters the Greek East: From Anarchy to Hierarchy in the Hellenistic Mediterranean, 230-188 B.C. (2008)
- Bad Moon Rising: How the Weather Underground Beat the FBI and Lost the Revolution. Yale University Press, 2016.

== See also ==
- Defensive imperialism
