= Hannibal's crossing of the Apennines =

- Part of the Second Punic War
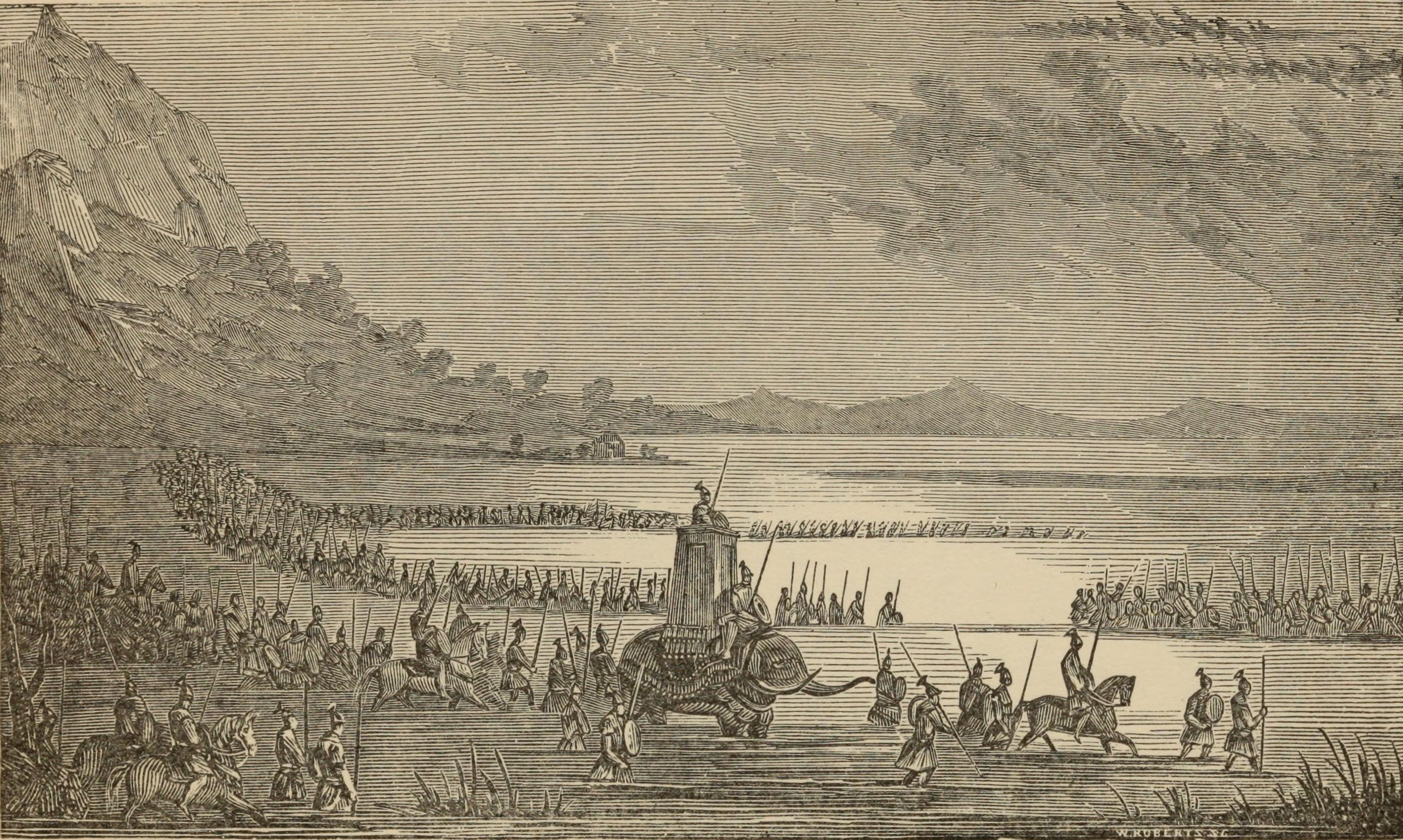
- Hannibal crossing the Arno marshes
Date	April or May of 217 BC
Location	Cisalpine Gaul, Etruria
Result	Hannibal continues his journey through Roman Italy.

Belligerents
Carthage; Tribes of Gaul	Roman Republic

Commanders and leaders
Hannibal; Mago Barca	Publius Cornelius Scipio; Tiberius Sempronius Longus; Gnaeus Servilius Geminus; Gaius Flaminius

Casualties and losses
Heavy	

Hannibal's crossing of the Apennines in the spring of 217 BC was a major military campaign in the Second Punic War. The campaign was directly preceded by Hannibal's crossing of the Alps the year earlier.

One of the main sources for the crossing of the Apennines lies in Livy's History of Rome. However, modern sources have indicated that Livy was misled into believing Hannibal attempted to cross the Apennines twice, which is likely false. Another useful source of the period, Polybius, states that Hannibal departed from his alpine camp "when the winter began to change".

== Crossing the Po River ==
When Hannibal was informed that Scipio's army had left their camp, he quickly pursued them in an attempt to prevent their crossing of the Po River. However, Hannibal had arrived too late. The main Roman army had managed to cross the river, while a detachment of a few hundred main remained on Hannibal's side of the river to guard the crossing. As Hannibal approached, the objective was to destroy the bridge before he could cross. This they had achieved. However, they did not have enough time to contrive a way to cross the river themselves and Hannibal ended up taking them prisoner.

Following Scipio's retreat south of the river, many Roman allies in the north switched allegiance to Hannibal, sending embassies to his camp and offering friendship or alliances. A large body of Gauls in the Roman camp, immediately after the Battle of Ticinus, deserted Rome, instead defecting to Hannibal. The Gauls defected in the night, killing the guards of the camp and reaching Hannibal. Hannibal allowed communication, but didn't allow the group into his army due to their tumultuous nature. He instead dismissed the group with gifts so that they could return to their respective homes, spreading his influence further in the region.

The army, ever celebratory of their victory on the Romans, made immediate preparations to cross the Po River. Some soldiers built rafts, others attempted to cross the river further up the stream. They could cross in these ways in total safety because there were no Romans on the opposite bank to oppose them. In fact, the Romans kept fleeing, as Scipio was injured and his wounds were beginning to inflame.

Hannibal's objective wasn't to march on Rome, since he would almost certainly be defeated. Rather, it was to force the Romans to negotiate on his terms by defeating her armies and dismantling Rome's confederacy in Italy. To achieve this, he couldn't stay in the Po Valley; he needed to strike at the peninsula, regardless of however many times he destroyed the Roman armies sent to him.

Hannibal switched his objective to heading southward, where support for Carthage was the highest. Not only that, but an added benefit of marching south was its closer proximity to the Carthaginian heartland. To march south, he would need to cut communications with units in the Po Valley and with Spain. However, to march into Etruria would allow his communications with the Celts to remain. Not only that, but a campaign through Etruria would even keep communications intact with Spain and the Po Valley. It would be much easier to outmaneuver any army sent to him if he invaded through Etruria. A campaign through Etruria would also allow possible support from the Etruscans, who had historically supported Carthage and had a recently soured relationship with the Romans.

In 217 BC, a Carthaginian squadron arrived at Pisa. The commander of the squadron believed that he would meet Hannibal there. This suggests that a rendezvous was planned between Hannibal and some commanders.

== After crossing the Po River ==
Immediately after Hannibal crossed the river, the Romans realized the danger which was now steadily approaching the capital. In light of these events, the authorities in Rome recalled the other consul, Sempronius, who was active in Sicily at the time. Prior to Hannibal's crossing, Scipio's and Longus' objectives were to threaten the Carthaginians and divert attention from Hannibal, hoping to prevent him being reinforced with fresh troops from Carthage. However, after Hannibal crossed the river, they abandoned the plan to threaten Carthage, instead sending an order to Sempronius to hasten home and assist in the defense of the peninsula.

After crossing the Po River, Hannibal had three choices: He could either proceed directly south into Liguria, march southeast down the Po River, or he could march south towards Rimini and follow the coast. The region of Liguria, inhabited by the Ligures, was considered to be incredibly dangerous. An attempt to invade Italy from its eastern coast was also destined to lead to an engagement between Hannibal and the Romans, and due to the coast's restricting nature, Hannibal would be prevented to maneuver.

Both Sempronius and Scipio disagreed on the course of action required to deal with Hannibal. Sempronius wished to attack Hannibal at haste, but Scipio argued that delay was the necessary plan. Sempronius attributed this to his mental dejection and discouragement due to his recent injuries. He also believed that Scipio felt envious that Sempronius would receive the honors for conquering Carthage while Scipio remained in his encampment, unable to command. Scipio, however, thought Sempronius was inconsiderate and reckless, disposed to rush into a battle whose commander he did not understand.

"Besides," said he, "of what use can it be to delay any longer? We are as ready to meet the Carthaginians now as we shall ever be. There is no third consul to come and help us; and what a disgrace it is for us Romans, who in the former war led our troops to the very gates of Carthage, to allow Hannibal to bear sway over all the north of Italy, while we retreat gradually before him, afraid to encounter now a force that we have always conquered before."

— Jacob Abbott, Hannibal, Chapter on the Apennines

While the two bickered, some small engagements between detachments occurred, in which Sempronius believed the Romans had the advantage. This made Sempronius even more enthusiastic to engage in combat with the Carthaginians. He eventually snapped at Scipio's caution and delay. He said that the soldiers were full of strength and courage, all eager for combat, and it was absurd to hold them back on account of the feebleness of one sick man.

== Battle of the Trebia ==
Hannibal, having spies in Roman encampments, quickly learned of the bickering between Sempronius and Scipio. He planned to exploit this in a pitched battle. Hannibal's plan was to draw the Romans out of their encampment on a dark, cold, and stormy night in December, and get them into the river Trebia. The river flowed north into the Po, between Rome and Carthage's encampments. Hannibal's plan was to send a detachment to attack the Roman camp early in the morning. He hoped that Sempronius would attempt a counterattack. The full army would then quickly cross the river, leaving the Romans in hot pursuit. As the Roman army would attack, they would be cold and wet from crossing the stream, while Hannibal's reserve army would attack, being warm and dry.

Hannibal placed a portion of his reserve army in an ambuscade, where there was tall grass and bushes. Hannibal examined the location, finding that the shrubbery was tall enough to even conceal his cavalry. He chose 200 of his best soldiers, saying:

"Yes, you are the men I want, only, instead of two hundred, I need two thousand. Go back to the army, and select and bring to me, each of you, nine men like yourselves."

— Jacob Abbott, Hannibal, Chapter on the Apennines

The detachment Hannibal sent did as ordered. As Hannibal had anticipated, the Romans were so caught up in the pursuit that they did not stop at the banks of the river. The conflict continued for many hours, and the whole army was broken up and later fled.

Despite the state of the Roman army, Hannibal gave up pursuit.

== Journey through Etruria ==
=== March into Etruria ===
As Hannibal marched into Etruria, it's likely that he used the route now occupied by Strada Statale 66 from Bologna south into Florence. During his march, the river Arno flooded a region in north Tuscany between Pistoia and Faesulae. The Romans had taken precautions to cover most paths that Hannibal would cross. However, it's still uncertain how many units were in each consular army. It's also uncertain what the Romans did with the veterans of Scipio's and Sempronius' army, but it's likely that they were withdrawn to Ariminum.

=== Into the Arno Marshes ===
Prior to his march, Hannibal had placed his most reliable infantry, the Africans and Spaniards, in the van, with the Celts in the center to prevent their desertion, which Hannibal had frequently worried about. He had also placed the cavalry, under his brother Mago, in the rear. As a result of this formation, the infantry were able to exit the marshland relatively unscathed. The Celts, however, suffered severely. Most pack-animals in the march also died, though Polybius stated that despite their death, they rendered one final service to their masters by providing them with somewhere firm to sleep since they weren't entirely submerged. Many of the horses lost their hooves, and Hannibal, who was present on the last remaining elephant, caught either Opthalmia or Conjunctivitis and lost his eye.

=== Leaving the marshlands ===
The trip through the marshlands, if we are to believe Polybius' account, lasted four days and three nights, but Hannibal's army eventually emerged from the marshes, resting near Faesulae. As the army was resting, Hannibal gathered intelligence about the Romans. He learned of the difference in mentality between the reckless enthusiasm of Sempronius and the cautious nature of Scipio.
