= Whittier Street Health Center =

Health center in Boston, Massachusetts, US

- Founded: 1933
- Type: Nonprofit
- Tax ID no.: 04-2619517
- Purpose: Primary care
- Location: Boston, Massachusetts, United States
- Region served: Boston, Massachusetts, United States, and national
- Method: health care, social determinants of health
- Key people: Frederica Williams (President & CEO)
- Revenue: $28,384,837 (FY2020)
- Website: www.wshc.org

Whittier Street Health Center is an American Federally Qualified Health Center that provides primary care and support services from the Roxbury, Dorchester, Mattapan, and the South End neighborhoods of Boston, Massachusetts.

== History ==
Founded in 1933 as a well-baby clinic, Whittier Street Health Center initially focused on women's health.

In 2011, Whittier was among four organizations recognized by Mayor Thomas Menino and the City of Boston at the Second Annual Mayoral Prize for Innovations in Primary Care. The award was for Whittier's Building Vibrant Communities Program, a partnership with the Boston Housing Authority in which health coordinators connect public housing residents with medical care and community services.

In January 2012, Whittier Street Health Center opened a newly constructed, 78,900 square foot facility, located at 1290 Tremont St. The project cost $38 million and was partly funded through a $12 million Human Resources and Services Administration (HRSA) American Recovery and Reinvestment Act grant. The building has the capacity to provide up to 220,000 visits annually, or about 70–80,000 patients.

In 2013, Whittier received a $9.5 million grant from the federal Health Resources and Services Administration to combat the chronic conditions prevalent in the communities served by the health center and to expand health care services. The grant enabled Whittier to provide services to patients in the Roxbury and North Dorchester neighborhoods who had been served by the Roxbury Comprehensive Community Health Center (RoxComp), which was put in receivership in April 2013.

In 2016 WSHC opened a satellite pharmacy in North Dorchester. The following summer, WSHC opened Whittier@Quincy Commons, a satellite clinic on Blue Hill Avenue. Whittier launched{ a Mobile Health Van to provide services to the homeless and community residents to address the high rates of sexually transmitted infections in Roxbury and surrounding neighborhoods, especially in the city's "hotspots". The Mobile Health Van identified two people who tested positive for HIV. Whittier launched an aggressive campaign to help to eradicate HIV in the low income communities of Boston.

Whittier Street Health Center has been recognized as one of the Top 100 Women-Led Businesses in Massachusetts by The Boston Globe and The Commonwealth Institute for four consecutive years. On October 24, 2014, the committee recognized President and CEO Frederica M. Williams for her leadership and Whittier's high quality, cost-effective health care for diverse populations. In October 2016, she was recognized by the Boston Business Journal as part of their 2016 Power 50 list celebrating "Influential Bostonians". and covered in their "2016 Women of Influence" article series. The designation of Top 100 Women-Led Businesses in Massachusetts was once again conferred upon Whittier Street Health Center in 2017.

In June 2018, Williams terminated 20 employees days before a vote to unionize. Williams attributed the sudden decision to a loss of grant funding, but many employees pointed out that the health center had been waging an anti-union campaign, hiring consultants and forcing employees to attend anti-union meetings during work hours. At the request of union organizers, Boston Mayor Martin Walsh intervened and offered to help Whittier find the funds to retain the fired workers. The workers were reinstated after Whittier management received assurances of funding assistance from Boston City Hall. A small number of employees, mainly doctors and clinicians, voted to join the union, 1199SEIU United Healthcare Workers East. Despite the controversy, a few days later the board of directors voted to name the health center's main building after executive director Williams, prompting a scathing column in the Boston Globe.

On January 27, 2020, WSHC announced it has withdrawn recognition from 1199SEIU United Healthcare Workers East after a majority of the employees in the professional bargaining unit represented by the union submitted a petition asking Whittier to withdraw recognition from the union.

Whittier Street Health Center was the first health center in Roxbury, to establish drive-thru and walk-up COVID-19 Testing sites for all Boston residents.

In 2021, Williams was recognized for her work and being an "Ethnic GEM" by the New England’s magazine as Strong, Determined and Committed to the Community.

== Accreditation and certifications ==
Whittier Street Health Center is accredited by the Joint Commission and recognized by the NCQA as a Level 3 Patient-Centered Medical Home. Its new building received Silver LEED certification from the US Green Building Council.

The outpatient addiction program at Whittier Street Health Center in Roxbury was mentioned in The Boston Globe's article "In Boston, Some Areas Bear Brunt of Opioid Overdoses" on August 6, 2016, for the Health Center's expertise in opioid treatment and use of the antioverdose drug Narcan.

In February 2024, Whittier Street Health Center was awarded three federal 2023 Community Health Quality Recognition awards from the U.S. Department of Health and Human Services: the Addressing Social Risk Factors award, the COVID-19 Public Health Champion award, and the Advancing Health in Technology for Quality award.

== Programs ==
Whittier provides adult medicine, family medicine, pediatrics, dental/orthodontic, health benefits, laboratory, OB/GYN, orthopedic, radiology, urgent care, a wellness and fitness club, and WIC programs. The health center also offers public health programs such as the Dana-Farber Community Cancer Center.

Whittier launched its Day Engagement Center (DEC) in October 2022, in partnership with the Mayor’s Office and the Boston Public Health Commission (BPHC). The Center was intended to de-centralize the Mass and Cass encampments, where individuals are regularly tempted by an open-air drug market, and to increase access to health care, social services, and support to unhoused and vulnerable adults. Whittier’s DEC initially operated Monday–Friday from 8:30 am to 5 pm, with a maximum capacity of 25 individuals on-site. In response to the migrant crisis in Roxbury, the Day Engagement Center expanded operations to evenings and Saturdays and also increased capacity to serve 30 individuals on-site at any given time. As of July 31, 2024, it had served nearly 700 people.

The Whittier Street Health Center Van transports individuals daily from Atkinson Street and Woods Mullen shelter to the DEC.
