= John Rich (scholar) =

Emeritus professor

Professor John Rich is emeritus professor in the department of Classics at The University of Nottingham.

He graduated with an MA and MPhil from Cambridge University, before gaining a PhD from Nottingham.

His research has focused mainly on Roman history of the Republican and early imperial periods, and in particular on three aspects, namely war, imperialism and international relations; Roman historiography; and the transition from Republic to monarchy under Augustus. These themes have been explored in his monography on Declaring War in the Roman Republic (Brussels, 1976), his edition with translation and commentary of Cassius Dio: The Augustan Settlement (Roman History 53–55.9) (Warminster, 1990), and numerous articles and book chapters.

He retired from Nottingham in 2008 and currently lives near Bristol.

He is currently completing a book on War, Expansion and Society on Early Rome, as well as articles and conference papers. He is a member of a group of UK scholars preparing a new edition of The Fragments of the Roman Historians, to which his contributions include the sections on Valerius Antias and the Annales Maximi.
