= Battle of Panormus =

Battle of the First Punic War, 250 BCE

- Part of the First Punic War
Date	250 BC
Location	Panormus (present-day Palermo) 38°07′N 13°22′E
Result	Roman victory

Belligerents
Rome	Carthage

Commanders and leaders
Lucius Caecilius Metellus	Hasdrubal

Strength
2 legions and 2 Alae (16,000–20,000 men)	30,000; 60–142 elephants

Casualties and losses
Unknown, but light	Heavy; All elephants captured
- Location of Panormus, on the north coast of Sicily

The Battle of Panormus was fought in Sicily in 250 BC during the First Punic War between a Roman army led by Lucius Caecilius Metellus and a Carthaginian force led by Hasdrubal, son of Hanno. The Roman force of two Roman and two allied legions defending the city of Panormus defeated the much larger Carthaginian army of 30,000 men and between 60 and 142 war elephants.

The war had commenced in 264 BC with Carthage in control of much of Sicily, where most of the fighting took place. In 256–255 BC the Romans attempted to strike at the city of Carthage in North Africa, but suffered a heavy defeat by a Carthaginian army strong in cavalry and elephants. When the focus of the war returned to Sicily, the Romans captured the large and important city of Panormus in 254 BC. Thereafter they avoided battle for fear of the war elephants which the Carthaginians had shipped to Sicily. In late summer 250 BC Hasdrubal led out his army to devastate the crops of the cities of Rome's allies. The Romans withdrew to Panormus and Hasdrubal pressed on to the city walls.

Once he arrived in Panormus, Metellus turned to fight, countering the elephants with a hail of javelins from earthworks dug near the walls. Under this missile fire the elephants panicked and fled through the Carthaginian infantry. The Roman heavy infantry then charged the Carthaginian left flank, which broke, along with the rest of the Carthaginians. The elephants were captured and later slaughtered in the Circus Maximus. This was the last significant land battle of the war, which ended nine years later in a Roman victory.

== Primary sources ==
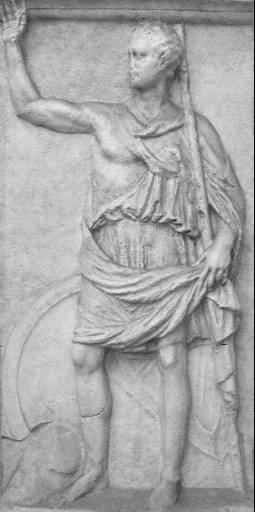
Polybius – "a remarkably well-informed, industrious, and insightful historian"

The main source for almost every aspect of the First Punic War (Note: The term Punic comes from the Latin word Punicus (or Poenicus), meaning "Carthaginian", and is a reference to the Carthaginians' Phoenician ancestry.) is the historian Polybius (c. 200 – c. 118 BC), a Greek sent to Rome in 167 BC as a hostage. His works include a lost manual on military tactics, but he is best known for his Histories, written after 146 BC, or about a century after the end of the war. Polybius's work is considered broadly objective and neutral between the Carthaginian and Roman points of view.

Carthaginian written records were destroyed with their capital, Carthage, in 146 BC and Polybius's account of the First Punic War is based on several lost Greek and Latin sources. Polybius was an analytical historian and when possible interviewed participants in the events he wrote about. Only part of the first book of the 40 comprising Histories deals with the First Punic War. The accuracy of Polybius's account has been much debated over the past 150 years, but the modern consensus is to accept it largely at face value, and the details of the battle in modern sources are almost entirely based on interpretations of Polybius's account. The modern historian Andrew Curry considers Polybius "fairly reliable"; while Dexter Hoyos describes him as "a remarkably well-informed, industrious, and insightful historian". Other, later, ancient histories of the war exist, but in fragmentary or summary form. Modern historians usually take into account the later histories of Diodorus Siculus and Dio Cassius, although the classicist Adrian Goldsworthy states "Polybius' account is usually to be preferred when it differs with any of our other accounts". (Note: Sources other than Polybius are discussed by Bernard Mineo in "Principal Literary Sources for the Punic Wars (apart from Polybius)".) Other sources include inscriptions, coins and archaeological evidence.

== Armies ==
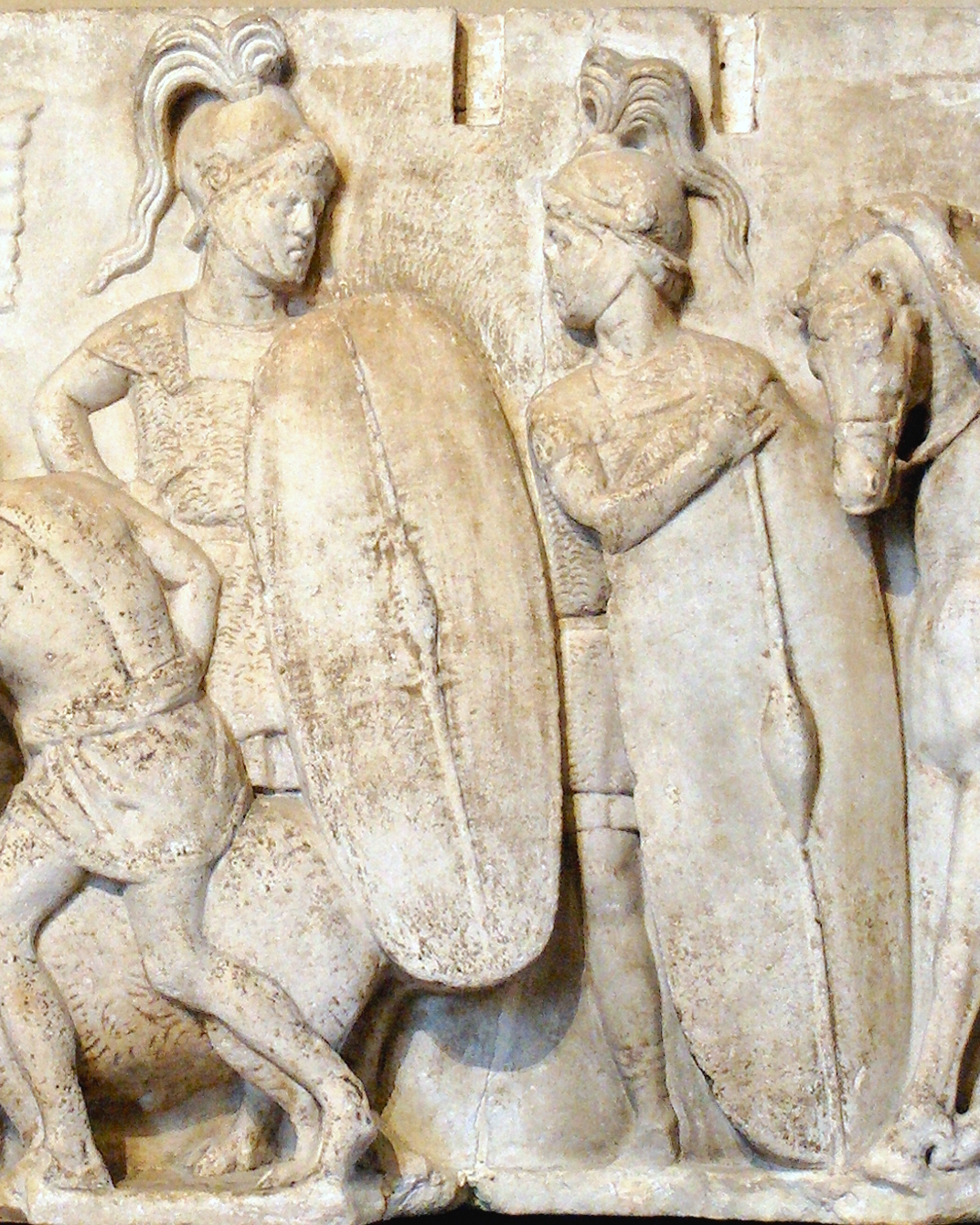
Detail from the Ahenobarbus relief showing two Roman foot-soldiers from the second century BC

Most male Roman citizens were liable for military service, and would serve as infantry, with a better-off minority providing a cavalry component. Traditionally, when at war the Romans would raise two legions of Roman troops and two alae of allies, each of 4,200 infantry (Note: This could be increased to 5,000 in some circumstances.) and 300 cavalry (900 cavalry for the ala). A small number of the infantry served as javelin-armed skirmishers. The others were equipped as heavy infantry, with body armour, a large shield, and short thrusting swords. They were divided into three ranks, of which the front rank also carried two javelins, while the second and third ranks had a thrusting spear instead. Both legionary sub-units and individual legionaries fought in relatively open order. It was the long-standing Roman procedure to elect two consuls each year to each lead an army. An army was usually formed by combining a Roman legion with a similarly sized and equipped legion provided by their Latin allies.

Carthaginian citizens only served in their army if there was a direct threat to the city of Carthage. In most circumstances Carthage recruited foreigners to make up its army. Many were from North Africa which provided several types of fighters including: close-order infantry equipped with large shields, helmets, short swords and long thrusting spears; javelin-armed light infantry skirmishers; close-order shock cavalry carrying spears; and light cavalry skirmishers who threw javelins from a distance and avoided close combat. Both Iberia and Gaul provided small numbers of experienced infantry; unarmoured troops who would charge ferociously, but had a reputation for breaking off if a combat was protracted. (Note: The Spanish used a heavy throwing spear which the Romans were later to adopt as the pilum.) The close-order African infantry would fight in a tightly packed formation known as a phalanx. Slingers were frequently recruited from the Balearic Islands. Roman and Greek sources refer to these foreign fighters derogatively as "mercenaries", but the modern historian Adrian Goldsworthy describes to this as "a gross oversimplification". They served under a variety of arrangements; for example, some were the regular troops of allied cities or kingdoms seconded to Carthage as part of formal treaties. The Carthaginians also employed war elephants; North Africa had indigenous African forest elephants at the time. (Note: These elephants were typically about 2.5-metre-high (8 ft) at the shoulder, and should not be confused with the larger African bush elephant.)

== Background ==
=== Start of the war ===
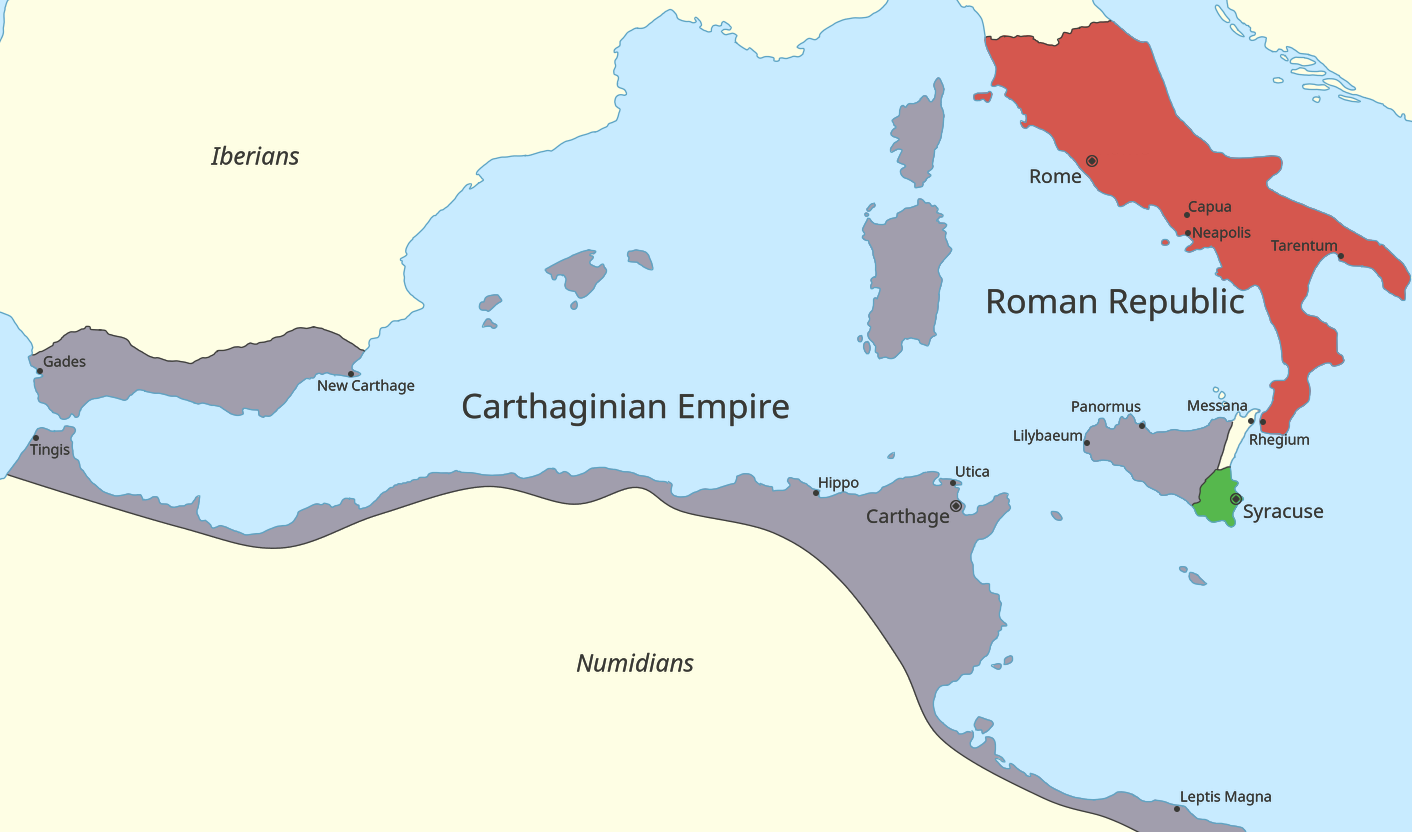
Territory controlled by Rome and Carthage at the start of the First Punic War

The Roman Republic had been aggressively expanding in the southern Italian mainland for a century before the First Punic War. It had conquered peninsular Italy south of the River Arno by 272 BC. By this time Carthage, with its capital in what is now Tunisia, had come to dominate southern Spain, much of the coastal regions of North Africa, the Balearic Islands, Corsica, Sardinia, and the western half of Sicily in a military and commercial empire. In the 3rd century BC Carthage and Rome were the preeminent powers in the western Mediterranean. In 264 BC the two cities went to war over the city of Messana (modern Messina) in the north-eastern tip of Sicily.

Much of the war was fought on, or in the waters near, Sicily. Away from the coasts its hilly and rugged terrain made manoeuvring large forces difficult and favoured defensive over offensive operations. Land operations were largely confined to raids, sieges and interdiction. Garrison duty and land blockades were the most common operations for both armies; only two full-scale pitched battles were fought on Sicily during the 23-year-long war; Panormus was one of these. (Note: The other was the Battle of Agrigentum, a Roman victory in 262 BC.) After several Roman successes the war on Sicily reached a stalemate, as the Carthaginians focused on defending well-fortified towns and cities; these were mostly on the coast and could be supplied and reinforced without the Romans being able to use their superior army to interfere.

=== Invasion of Africa ===
From 260 BC the focus of the war shifted to the sea. The Romans won naval victories at Mylae (260 BC) and Sulci (258 BC), and their frustration at the continuing stalemate in Sicily led them to develop a plan to invade the Carthaginian heartland in North Africa and threaten the city of Carthage (close to modern Tunis). After defeating the Carthaginians at the Battle of Cape Ecnomus, possibly the largest naval battle in history by the number of combatants involved, the Roman army landed in Africa on the Cape Bon Peninsula and began ravaging the Carthaginian countryside.

Most of the Roman ships returned to Sicily, leaving 15,000 infantry and 500 cavalry to continue the war in Africa. A Carthaginian army which was strong in cavalry and elephants and approximately the same size as the Romans' was defeated after the Carthaginians positioned it on a rocky hill and the Roman infantry stormed it. The Carthaginian's losses are unknown, although their elephants and cavalry escaped with few casualties. The Carthaginians gave charge of the training of their army to the Spartan mercenary commander Xanthippus. In early 255 BC Xanthippus led an army of 12,000 infantry, 4,000 cavalry and 100 elephants against 15,500 Romans, offered battle to them on an open plain, and decisively defeated them at the Battle of Tunis. The elephants played a prominent part in this victory. Approximately 2,000 Romans retreated to Aspis; 500 were captured; 13,000 were killed. The Romans evacuated the survivors by sea, but the Roman fleet was devastated by a storm while returning to Italy, with 384 ships sunk from their total of 464 and 100,000 men lost—the majority non-Roman Latin allies.

== Prelude ==
Sicily, the main theatre of the war

Having lost most of their fleet in the storm of 255 BC, the Romans rapidly rebuilt it, adding 220 new ships, and launched a determined offensive in Sicily; their entire fleet, under both consuls, attacked Panormus early in 254 BC. Panormus was a large, for the time, city on the north coast of Sicily, the site of the modern Sicilian capital Palermo. (Note: The classicist John Lazenby suggests that Panormus's outer town was on the site of modern Cassaro, and the inner town on that of Kalsa.) It had a population of approximately 70,000 and was one of the largest Sicilian cities still loyal to Carthage and the most important economically. The city's prosperity was based on trade and fishing, which resulted in an unusual lack of agriculture and the area immediately around the city was thickly forested, even close to the gates. The city was surrounded and blockaded, and siege engines set up. These made a breach in the walls which the Romans stormed, capturing the outer town and giving no quarter. The inner town promptly surrendered. The 14,000 inhabitants who could afford it ransomed themselves and the remaining 13,000 were sold into slavery.

Much of western inland Sicily then went over to the Romans: Ietas, Solous, Petra, and Tyndaris all came to terms. In 252 BC the Romans captured Thermae and Lipara, which had been isolated by the fall of Panormus. In late 253 BC or early 252 BC Carthaginian reinforcements were sent to Sicily under Hasdrubal, who had taken part in the two battles against the Romans in Africa. The Romans avoided battle in 252 and 251 BC; according to Polybius because they feared the war elephants which the Carthaginians had shipped to Sicily. The historian Nigel Bagnall suggests that survivors of the battle against Xanthippus passed on "horrific stories" of the effectiveness of the Carthaginian cavalry and elephants in open battle. In consequence the Carthaginians, probably with a smaller army than the Romans, dominated the plains; while the Romans stayed on higher and broken ground, where much of the effect of the cavalry and elephants would have been nullified. Both sides declined to fight on their opponents' favoured terrain.

== Battle ==
In late summer 250 BC Hasdrubal, hearing that one consul (Gaius Furius Pacilus) had left Sicily with half of the Roman army, marched out from the major Carthaginian stronghold of Lilybaeum towards Panormus with 30,000 men and between 60 and 142 elephants. Halting some distance away, he devastated the harvest in the territories of Rome's newly allied cities, in an attempt to provoke the Roman commander, Lucius Caecilius Metellus, into battle. The Roman troops amounted to two legions, and they had been dispersed to gather the harvest. Metellus withdrew them in front of the advancing Carthaginians and they retreated into Panormus. This timidity was what Hasdrubal had come to expect, and he advanced down the Oreto valley, continuing to despoil the countryside. The Oreto reached the sea immediately south of Panormus, and once there Hasdrubal ordered part of his army to cross the river and advance up to the city wall.

Once the elephants had crossed, or were crossing, the river, Metellus sent his light infantry to skirmish with the Carthaginians and impede their passage. These light troops hurled javelins at the Carthaginians, and had been instructed to concentrate on their elephants. Panormus was a major supply depot, and townspeople were employed in carrying bundles of javelins from stocks within the city to the foot of the walls so the Roman skirmishers were constantly resupplied. The ground between the river and the city was covered with earthworks, some constructed during the Roman siege and some part of the city's defensive works, which provided cover for the Romans and made it difficult for the elephants to advance, or even manoeuvre. The elephants' mahouts, eager to demonstrate their charges' prowess, nevertheless drove them forward. Some accounts also have missiles being hurled down from the city walls at them. Peppered with missiles and unable to retaliate, the elephants panicked and fled through the Carthaginian infantry behind them.

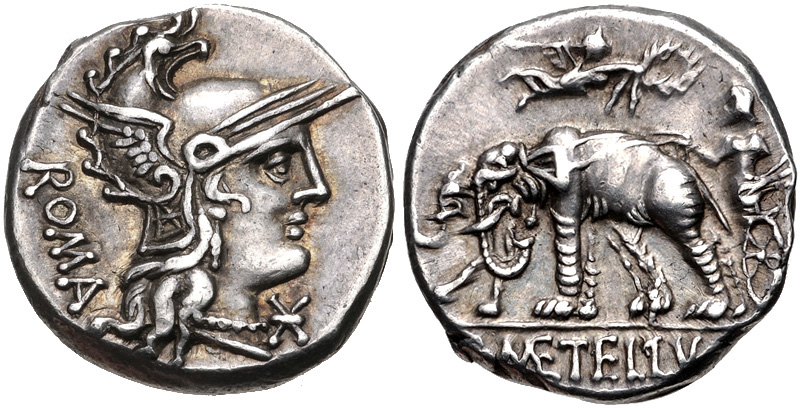
Denarius of C. Caecilius Metellus Caprarius (125 BC). The reverse alludes to the triumph of his ancestor Lucius Caecilius Metellus which featured the elephants he captured at Panormus.

Metellus had concealed himself and a large part of his army either in the woods just outside the city gate, or immediately inside the gates; in either case this meant he was upstream from where the Carthaginian army was fording the river. From here Metellus fed fresh troops into the large-scale skirmish under the city walls. When the elephants broke, disorganising a large part of the Carthaginian army and demoralising all of it, Metellus ordered an attack on its left flank. The Carthaginians fled; those who attempted to fight were cut down. Metellus did not permit a pursuit, but did capture ten elephants in the immediate aftermath and, according to some accounts, the rest of the surviving animals over the succeeding days.

Contemporary accounts do not report the other losses of either side, although the Carthaginians' are thought to have been heavy. Modern historians consider later claims of 20,000–30,000 Carthaginian casualties improbable. Similarly, later accounts that the large Celtic contingent in the Carthaginian army were drunk when the battle began are usually dismissed; as is the suggestion that a Carthaginian fleet took part in the operation, causing heavy casualties when many fleeing soldiers ran into the sea hoping to be taken off by their ships.

== Aftermath ==
The Carthaginian defeat, and especially the loss of their elephants, resulted in the Romans feeling freer to manoeuvre on the plains, and the Carthaginians no longer being willing to challenge them. As was the Carthaginian custom after a defeat, Hasdrubal was recalled to Carthage to be executed. After his success at Panormus, Metellus received a triumph in Rome on 7 September 250 BC, during which he paraded with the elephants he had captured at Panormus, who were then slaughtered in the Circus Maximus. The elephant was adopted as the emblem of the powerful Caecilii Metelli family, whose members featured an elephant on the coins they minted until the end of the Republic.

Hasdrubal's successor, Adhubal, decided that the large fortified city of Selinus could no longer be garrisoned and had the town evacuated and destroyed. Encouraged by their victory at Panormus, the Romans moved against the main Carthaginian base on Sicily, Lilybaeum. A large army commanded by the year's consuls Gaius Atilius Regulus and Lucius Manlius Vulso Longus besieged the city. They had rebuilt their fleet, and blockaded the harbour with 200 ships. The city was still held by the Carthaginians when the war ended with a Roman victory nine years later in 241 BC.

Tension remained high between the two states as they both continued to expand in the western Mediterranean. When Carthage besieged the Roman-protected town of Saguntum in eastern Iberia in 218 BC, it ignited the Second Punic War with Rome.

== Notes, citations and sources ==
=== Sources ===
- Bagnall, Nigel (1999). The Punic Wars: Rome, Carthage and the Struggle for the Mediterranean. London: Pimlico. ISBN 978-0-7126-6608-4.
- Champion, Craige B. (2015) [2011]. "Polybius and the Punic Wars". In Hoyos, Dexter (ed.). A Companion to the Punic Wars. Chichester, West Sussex: John Wiley. pp. 95–110. ISBN 978-1-4051-7600-2.
- Collins, Roger (1998). Spain: An Oxford Archaeological Guide. Oxford University Press. ISBN 978-0-19-285300-4.
- Crawford, Michael (1974). Roman Republican Coinage. Vol. I. Cambridge: Cambridge University Press. OCLC 859598398.
- Curry, Andrew (2012). "The Weapon That Changed History". Archaeology. 65 (1): 32–37. JSTOR 41780760.
- Erdkamp, Paul (2015) [2011]. "Manpower and Food Supply in the First and Second Punic Wars". In Hoyos, Dexter (ed.). A Companion to the Punic Wars. Chichester, West Sussex: John Wiley. pp. 58–76. ISBN 978-1-4051-7600-2.
- Goldsworthy, Adrian (2006). The Fall of Carthage: The Punic Wars 265–146 BC. London: Phoenix. ISBN 978-0-304-36642-2.
- Hau, Lisa (2016). Moral History from Herodotus to Diodorus Siculus. Edinburgh: Edinburgh University Press. ISBN 978-1-4744-1107-3.
- Hoyos, Dexter (2015) [2011]. A Companion to the Punic Wars. John Wiley. ISBN 978-1-4051-7600-2.
- Koon, Sam (2015) [2011]. "Phalanx and Legion: the "Face" of Punic War Battle". In Hoyos, Dexter (ed.). A Companion to the Punic Wars. Chichester, West Sussex: John Wiley. pp. 77–94. ISBN 978-1-4051-7600-2.
- Lazenby, John (1996). The First Punic War: A Military History. Stanford, California: Stanford University Press. ISBN 978-0-8047-2673-3.
- Miles, Richard (2011). Carthage Must be Destroyed. London: Penguin. ISBN 978-0-14-101809-6.
- Mineo, Bernard (2015) [2011]. "Principal Literary Sources for the Punic Wars (apart from Polybius)". In Hoyos, Dexter (ed.). A Companion to the Punic Wars. Chichester, West Sussex: John Wiley. pp. 111–128. ISBN 978-1-4051-7600-2.
- Morgan, M. Gwyn (1972). "Polybius and the Date of the Battle of Panormus". The Classical Quarterly. 22 (1): 121–129. doi:10.1017/S0009838800034091. hdl:2152/24128. JSTOR 637895. S2CID 170609765.
- Rankov, Boris (2015) [2011]. "A War of Phases: Strategies and Stalemates". In Hoyos, Dexter (ed.). A Companion to the Punic Wars. Chichester, West Sussex: John Wiley. pp. 149–166. ISBN 978-1-4051-7600-2.
- Scullard, H. H. (2006) [1989]. "Carthage and Rome". In Walbank, F. W.; Astin, A. E.; Frederiksen, M. W. & Ogilvie, R. M. (eds.). The Cambridge Ancient History: Volume 7, Part 2, 2nd Edition. Cambridge: Cambridge University Press. pp. 486–569. ISBN 978-0-521-23446-7.
- Shutt, Rowland (1938). "Polybius: A Sketch". Greece & Rome. 8 (22): 50–57. doi:10.1017/S001738350000588X. JSTOR 642112. S2CID 162905667.
- Sidwell, Keith C.; Jones, Peter V. (1997). The World of Rome: An Introduction to Roman Culture. Cambridge University Press. ISBN 978-0-521-38600-5.
- Tipps, G.K. (1985). "The Battle of Ecnomus". Historia: Zeitschrift für Alte Geschichte. 34 (4): 432–465. JSTOR 4435938.
- Walbank, F. W. (1957). A Historical Commentary on Polybius. Vol. 1. Oxford: Clarendon Press. ISBN 978-0-19-814152-5.
- Walbank, F. W. (1990). Polybius. Vol. 1. Berkeley: University of California Press. ISBN 978-0-520-06981-7.
- Warmington, Brian (1993) [1960]. Carthage. New York: Barnes & Noble, Inc. ISBN 978-1-56619-210-1.
