= Hasdrubal, son of Hanno =

Carthaginian general during the First Punic War(died c. 250 BC)

Hasdrubal
- Died: c. 250 BC Carthage
- Allegiance: Carthage
- Rank: General
- Conflicts: First Punic War; Battle of Adys; Battle of Tunis; Battle of Panormus

Hasdrubal (fl. 255 – 250 BC) was a Carthaginian general who served during the middle years of the First Punic War, fought between Carthage and Rome, and took a leading part in three of the four major field battles of the war. He was a citizen of the city state of Carthage, which was in what is now Tunisia. His date of birth and age at death are both unknown, as are his activities prior to his coming to prominence in 255 BC. Modern historians distinguish him from other Carthaginians named Hasdrubal by the cognomen "son of Hanno".

Hasdrubal was one of three Carthaginian generals, possibly the senior, who took command of the army raised when the Romans invaded North Africa in 255 BC. He was responsible for the decision to march against the Romans late in the year and was present at the Battle of Adys where the Carthaginians were routed. Early in 254 BC the triumvirate of Carthaginian generals gave control of the army to the Spartan mercenary commander, Xanthippus, and accompanied him when the Romans were decisively beaten at the Battle of Tunis.

The focus of the war moved to the island of Sicily where Hasdrubal took command of the Carthaginian army. The Romans avoided battle between 254 and 251 BC because they feared the war elephants which had accompanied Hasdrubal. In late summer 250 BC Hasdrubal led out his army, the Romans withdrew to Panormus and Hasdrubal pressed on to the city walls. Once he arrived at Panormus, the Romans turned to fight, countering the elephants with a hail of javelins. Under this missile fire the elephants panicked and fled through the Carthaginian infantry. The Roman heavy infantry then charged and the Carthaginian army broke. Hasdrubal was recalled to Carthage to be executed.

== Name ==
Hasdrubal was a citizen of the city state of Carthage; modern historians distinguish him from other Carthaginians named Hasdrubal by the cognomen "son of Hanno". Hasdrubal's date of birth and age at death are both unknown, as are his activities prior to his coming to prominence in 255 BC during the First Punic War. Only four set piece land battles took place during the 23 years of the war; Hasdrubal took part as a general in three of them.

== Background ==
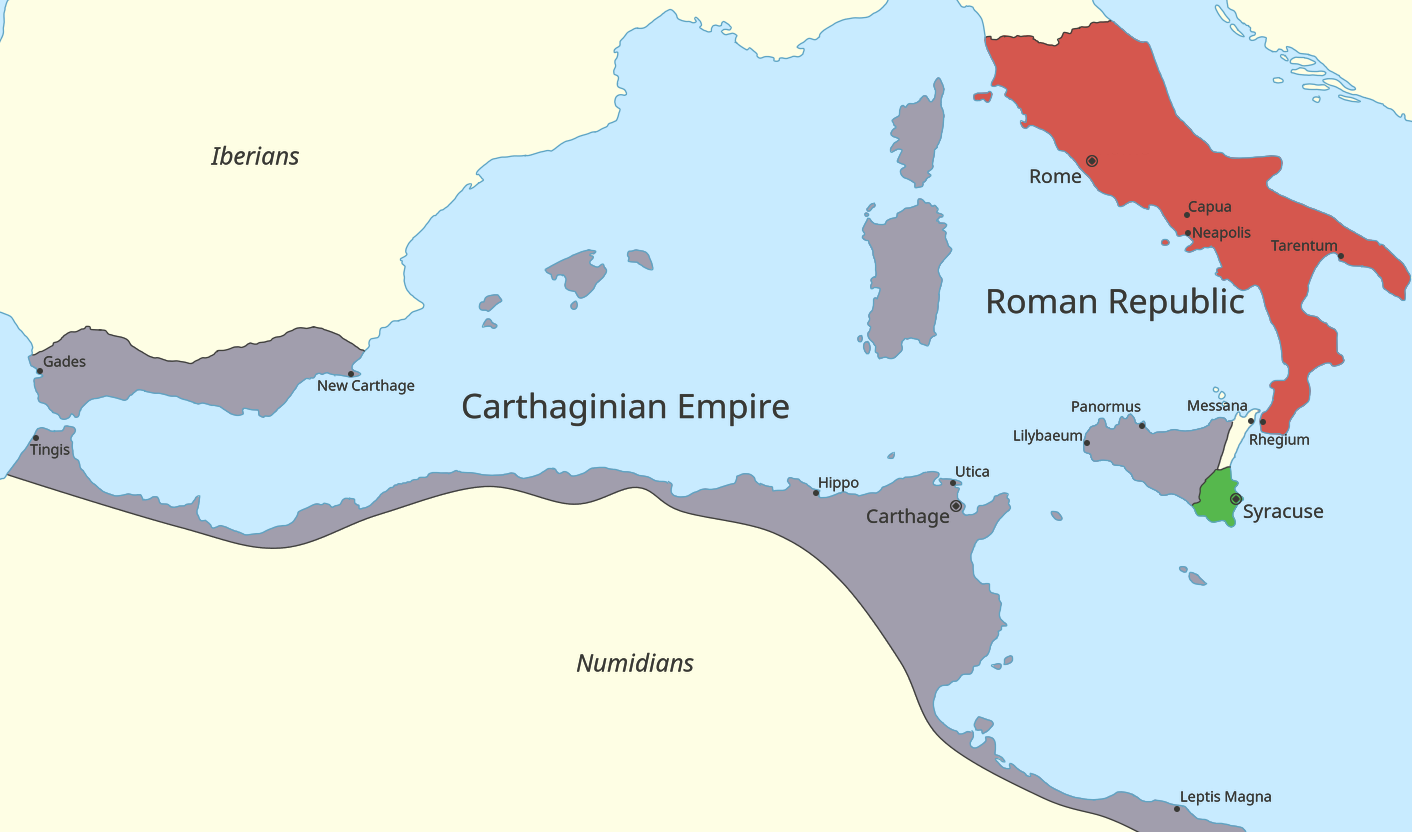
Territory controlled by Rome and Carthage at the start of the First Punic War

The city of Carthage was in what is now Tunisia (close to what is now Tunis) and by the mid-3rd century BC it had come to dominate southern Iberia, much of the coastal regions of North Africa, the Balearic Islands, Corsica, Sardinia, and the western half of Sicily in a military and commercial empire. Carthage was the leading maritime power in the Western Mediterranean with its navy dominating both militarily and commercially, while Rome had recently unified mainland Italy south of the Arno. The First Punic War broke out between Carthage and Rome in 264 BC and by 260 BC the war had grown into a struggle in which the Romans wanted to at least control the whole of Sicily.

The Carthaginians were engaging in their traditional policy of waiting for their opponents to wear themselves out, in the expectation of then regaining some or all of their possessions and negotiating a mutually satisfactory peace treaty. The Romans were essentially a land-based power and had gained control of much of Sicily using their army. The war there had reached a stalemate, as the Carthaginians focused on defending their well-fortified towns and cities; these were mostly on the coast and so could be supplied and reinforced by sea without the Romans being able to use their superior army to interfere. The focus of the war shifted to the sea, where the Romans had little experience; in 260 BC Romans set out to construct a fleet using a shipwrecked Carthaginian quinquereme as a blueprint for their own ships.

== Invasion of Africa ==
Naval victories at Mylae in 260 BC and Sulci in 258 BC, and their frustration at the continuing stalemate in Sicily, led the Romans to focus on a sea-based strategy and to develop a plan to invade the Carthaginian heartland in North Africa and threaten its capital, Carthage. Both sides were determined to establish naval supremacy and invested large amounts of money and manpower in increasing and maintaining the size of their navies.

=== Battle of Ecnomus ===
The Roman fleet of 330 warships plus an unknown number of transport ships sailed from Ostia, the port of Rome, in early 256 BC, commanded by the consuls for the year, Marcus Atilius Regulus and Lucius Manlius Vulso Longus. They embarked approximately 26,000 picked legionaries from the Roman forces on Sicily. The Carthaginians were aware of the Romans' intentions and mustered all available warships, 350, under Hanno (Note: He was known as Hanno the Great, the second (of three) Carthaginians named Hanno to be awarded that sobriquet.) and Hamilcar, off the south coast of Sicily to intercept them. The combined total of about 680 warships carrying up to 290,000 crew and marines (Note: The modern historian Boris Rankov writes that it "may have involved the largest number of combatants of any naval battle in history"; a view also put forward by the classicist John Lazenby.) met in the Battle of Cape Ecnomus. The Carthaginians took the initiative, anticipating that their superior ship-handling skills would tell. After a prolonged and confused day of fighting the Carthaginians were defeated, losing 30 ships sunk and 64 captured to Roman losses of 24 ships sunk.

=== Battle of Adys ===
A map of the movements of the Roman army which invaded Africa 1: Romans land and capture Aspis (256 BC) 2: Roman victory at Adys (256 BC) 3: Romans capture Tunis (256 BC) 4: Xanthippus sets out from Carthage with a large army (255 BC) 5: Romans are defeated at the Battle of Tunis. (255 BC) 6: Romans retreat to Aspis and leave Africa. (255 BC)

As a result of the battle, the Roman army, commanded by Regulus, landed in Africa near Aspis (modern Kelibia) on the Cape Bon Peninsula in the summer of 256 BC and began ravaging the Carthaginian countryside. They captured 20,000 slaves, "vast herds of cattle", and, after a brief siege, the city of Aspis. They also fomented rebellions in many of Carthage's subject territories. The Roman Senate sent orders for most of the Roman ships and a large part of the army to return to Sicily, probably due to the logistical difficulties of feeding these more than 100,000 men over the winter. Regulus was left with 40 ships, 15,000 infantry and 500 cavalry to overwinter in Africa. His orders were to weaken the Carthaginian army, pending reinforcement in the spring. It was expected he would achieve this by raids and by encouraging Carthage's rebellious subject territories, but consuls had wide discretion.

This is the point at which Hasdrubal first appears in the historical record. The Carthaginian Senate appointed him as a general, jointly with Bostar, to counter the Roman threat. They took command of an army which was strong in cavalry and elephants and were joined by a third general, Hamilcar, the Carthaginian commander on Sicily, who was recalled along with 5,000 infantry and 500 cavalry. The total size and the makeup of the army is not known, but it was reported to be approximately the same size as the Roman army. (A few months later, at the Battle of Tunis, the Carthaginians fielded 100 elephants, 4,000 cavalry and 12,000 infantry; the latter would have included many citizen-militia.) Hasdrubal may have been the senior of the three Carthaginian generals as he is reported to have made the decision to march their army out to oppose Regulus.

Regulus had chosen to take his relatively small force and strike inland. He advanced on the city of Adys (modern Uthina), only 60 km (37 mi) south-east of Carthage, and besieged it. Determined to prevent the Romans further despoiling the countryside, the Carthaginian generals advanced their army to Adys, where it set up a fortified camp on a rocky hill near the town. They did not wish to commit to a battle on the open ground around Adys too hastily. The ancient Roman historian Polybius is critical of this decision by the Carthaginians, as their main advantages over the Romans were their cavalry and their elephants, neither of which could be deployed to advantage from behind fortifications, on steep ground, or in rough terrain. Modern historians point out that the Carthaginian generals would have been well aware of the strength of the legions when formed up in open battle and that to pause in a strong position while scouting the enemy and formulating a plan was not obviously a mistake. This was especially the case as their army was newly formed and not yet fully trained or used to operating together; although the modern historian George Tipps describes this deployment as a "total misuse" of their cavalry and elephants.

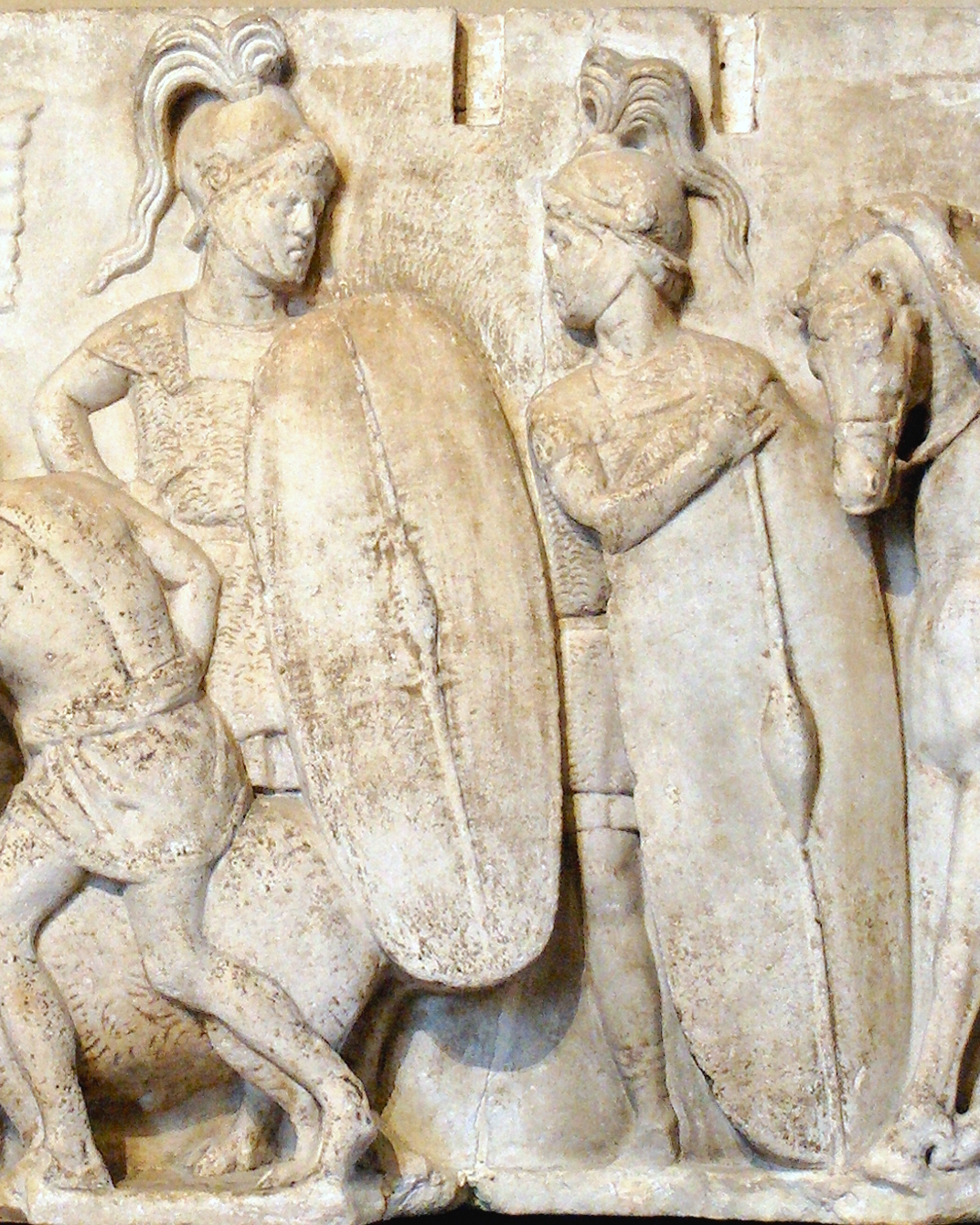
Detail from the Ahenobarbus relief showing two Roman foot-soldiers from the second century BC

With the Carthaginian army overlooking him from a fortified hill Regulus immediately made the audacious decision to split his army in two and have each carry out a night march to launch a surprise dawn attack on the camp. The Romans would be attacking uphill against the Carthaginians' prepared position, but an attack from two directions would be difficult to respond to. Tipps describes the plan as a demonstration of Regulus's "recklessness". Both Roman forces were in position on time and successfully launched their attacks, although apparently not simultaneously. Complete surprise cannot have been achieved, as at least a large part of the Carthaginians were able to form up and confront one half of the Roman assault at the fortifications. This column was thrown back by the Carthaginian defenders and driven down the hill in disorder. The situation was confused, with the rest of the Carthaginians taking no effective action and failing to co-ordinate with their victorious colleagues. The role of Hasdrubal and his fellow generals in this fighting is unclear. According to the military historian Nigel Bagnall, the cavalry and elephants were promptly evacuated, as it was recognised they would not be able to play any useful role, either in defending the fortifications or on the broken terrain of the hill more generally.

Those Carthaginians pursuing the first Roman force chased them off the hill, and all or part of the second Roman column, rather than attacking the Carthaginian camp, charged downhill into the rear of the now over-extended Carthaginians. It is possible this group of Carthaginians also faced a frontal counter-attack by Roman reserves after leaving the hill. In any event, after some further fighting the Carthaginians fled the field. At this time the Carthaginians in the camp, the fortifications of which had not been breached, panicked and withdrew. Again, the extent to which this was at Hasdrubal and his fellows' command is unclear. The Romans pursued for some distance, although the primary sources provide no figures for Carthaginian losses. Modern historians suggest the early Carthaginian order to evacuate their cavalry and elephants meant that they suffered few or no losses, while losses among the infantry would have been heavier. Breaking off their pursuit, the victorious Romans plundered the hilltop camp.

=== Battle of Tunis ===
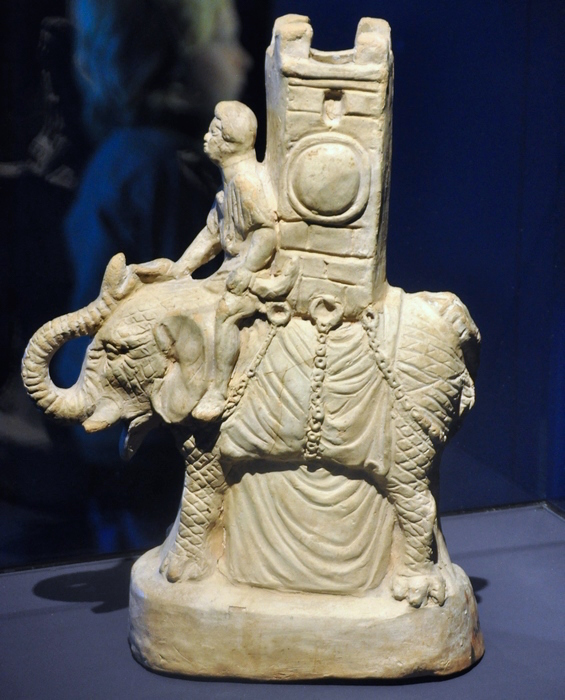
Roman statuette of a war elephant recovered from Pompeii

The Romans followed up and captured numerous towns, including Tunis, only 16 km (10 mi) from Carthage. From Tunis the Romans raided and devastated the immediate area around Carthage. Many of Carthage's African possessions took the opportunity to rise in revolt. The city of Carthage was packed with refugees fleeing Regulus or the rebels, and food ran out. In despair the Carthaginians sued for peace. Regulus, within sight of what he took to be a thoroughly defeated Carthage, demanded harsh terms. Finding these unacceptable, the Carthaginians decided to fight on.

The Carthaginians were recruiting fighting men from all over the Mediterranean region, and at around this time a large group of recruits from Greece arrived in Carthage. Among them was a Spartan mercenary commander, Xanthippus. Polybius notes that he had taken part in Spartan training methods and that he knew both how to deploy and how to manoeuvre an army. He made a good impression with the troops of the Carthaginian army, and was able to persuade the Carthaginian Senate that the strongest elements of their army were their cavalry and elephants and that to be deployed to best effect they needed to fight on open level ground. The historian John Lazenby speculates he may have previously faced elephants when Pyrrhus of Epirus attacked Sparta in the 270s BC. Xanthippus was put in charge of training both the new recruits and the existing army over the winter, although the committee of three Carthaginian generals retained operational control. As the prospect of a decisive battle drew nearer, and as Xanthippus's skill at manoeuvring the army became more evident, full control was given to him. Whether this was a decision of the generals, the Senate, or was forced on them by the wishes of the troops, who included many Carthaginian citizens, is not clear.

Xanthippus, accompanied by the triumvirate of Carthaginian generals, led the army of 100 elephants, 4,000 cavalry and 12,000 infantry—the latter included the 5,000 veterans from Sicily and many citizen-militia—out of Carthage and set up camp close to the Romans in an area of open plain. The precise site is not known, but it is assumed to be close to Tunis. The Roman army of about 15,000 infantry and 500 cavalry advanced to meet them, and set up camp about 2 km (1.2 mi) away. The next morning both sides deployed for battle. Xanthippus placed the Carthaginian citizen-militia in the centre of his formation; with the Sicilian veterans and the freshly hired infantry divided on either side of them; and with the cavalry equally divided on either side of these. The elephants were deployed in a single line in front of the centre of the infantry. The Romans placed their legionary infantry in their centre, arranged in a deeper and denser formation than usual. Polybius considered this to be an effective anti-elephant formation, but points out that it shortened the frontage of the Roman infantry and made them susceptible to being out-flanked. Light infantry skirmishers were positioned in front of the legions, and the 500 cavalry were divided between the flanks. Regulus apparently hoped to punch through the elephants with his massed infantry, overcome the Carthaginian phalanx in their centre and so win the battle before he needed to worry about being attacked on the flanks.

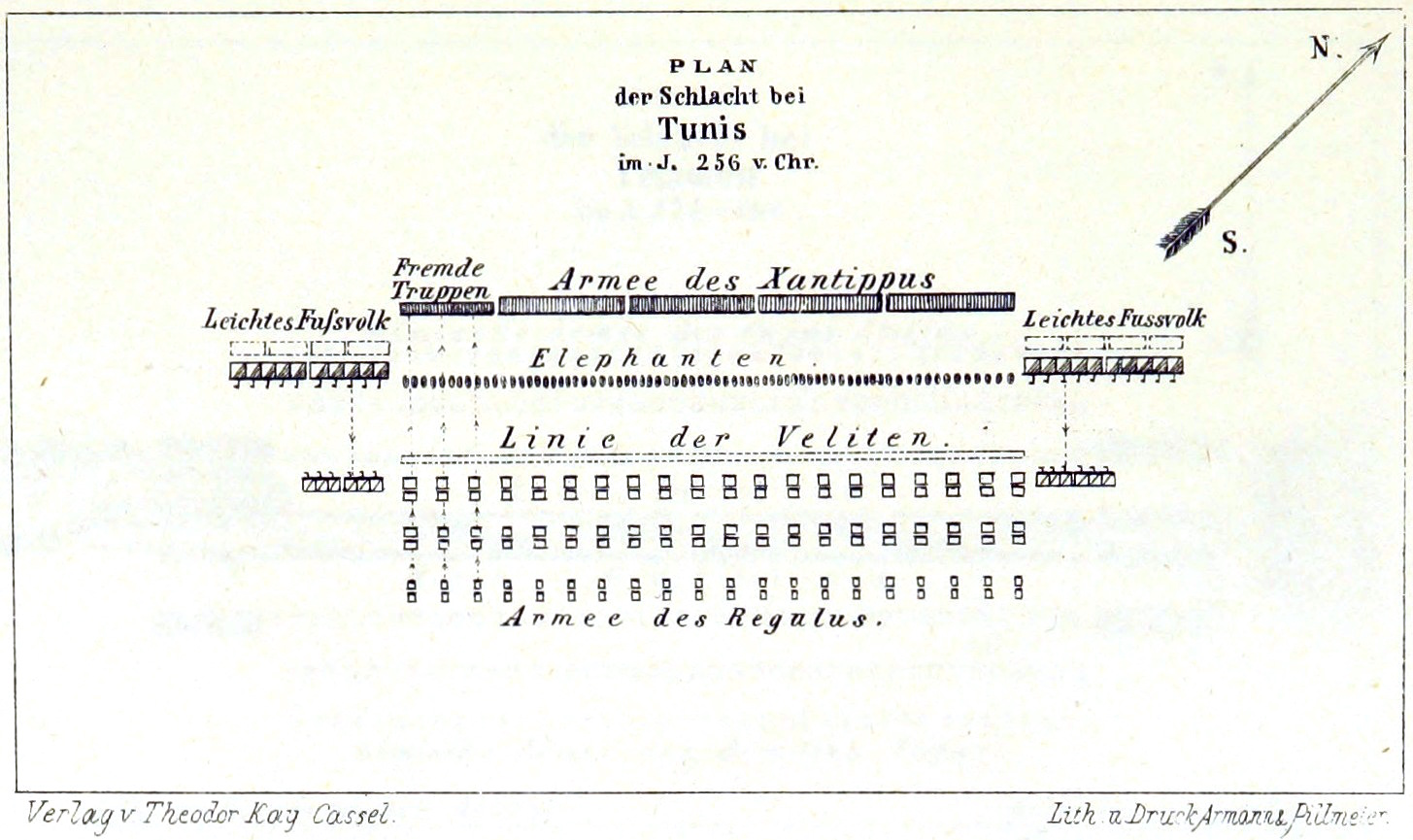
A map of the Battle of Tunis: Carthaginians at top, Romans at bottom and elephants in the middle

The battle opened with attacks by the Carthaginian cavalry and elephants. The Roman cavalry, hopelessly outnumbered, were soon swept away. The Roman legionaries advanced, shouting and banging their sword hilts on their shields in an attempt to deter the elephants. Part of the Roman left overlapped the line of elephants, and they charged the infantry of the Carthaginian right, who broke and fled back to their camp, pursued by the Romans. This part of the Roman force probably consisted of Latin allies (socii). The rest of the Roman infantry had difficulties with the elephants, who were not deterred by their noise but charged home, inflicting casualties and considerable confusion. At least some of the legionaries fought their way through the line of elephants, and attacked the Carthaginian phalanx. But they were too disordered to fight effectively and the phalanx held firm. Some units of the Carthaginian cavalry were now returning from their pursuit and started to attack or feint against the Roman rear and flanks. The Romans attempted to fight on all sides which brought their forward momentum to a halt.

The Romans held firm, possibly partly because of the way their dense formation jammed them close together, but the elephants continued to rampage through their ranks, and the Carthaginian cavalry pinned them in place by hurling missiles into their rear and flanks. Then Xanthippus ordered the phalanx to attack. Most of the Romans were packed into a space where they could not resist effectively and were slaughtered. Regulus and a small force fought their way out of the encirclement, but were pursued and shortly he and 500 survivors were forced to surrender. (Note: Some later Roman accounts make various claims of Regulus being mistreated, but Polybius does not mention this and Diodorus, a writer hostile to the Carthaginians, suggests he died from natural causes.) A total of about 13,000 Romans were killed. The Carthaginians lost 800 men from the force on their right which was routed; the losses of the rest of their army are not known. A force of 2,000 Romans survived, from the left wing who had broken through into the Carthaginian camp; they escaped the battlefield and retreated to Aspis. This was Carthage's only victory in a major land battle during the war.

Xanthippus, fearful of the envy of Hasdrubal and the other Carthaginian generals he had outdone, took his pay and returned to Greece. Regulus died in Carthaginian captivity; later Roman authors invented a tale of him displaying heroic virtue while a prisoner. The Romans sent a fleet to evacuate their survivors and the Carthaginians attempted to oppose it. In the resulting Battle of Cape Hermaeum off Africa the Carthaginians were heavily defeated, losing 114 ships captured and 16 sunk. The Roman fleet, in turn, was devastated by a storm while returning to Italy: 384 ships were sunk from their total of 464 (Note: This assumes, per G. K. Tipps, that all 114 captured Carthaginian vessels were sailing with the Romans.) and 100,000 men lost, the majority non-Roman Latin allies.

== Sicily ==
Sicily, the main theatre of the war

Having lost most of their fleet in the storm of 255 BC, the Romans rapidly rebuilt it, adding 220 new ships, and launched a determined offensive in Sicily; their entire fleet, under both consuls, attacked Panormus early in 254 BC. Panormus was a large-for-the-time city on the north coast of Sicily, the site of the modern Sicilian capital Palermo. (Note: The classicist John Lazenby suggests that Panormus's outer town was on the site of modern Cassaro, and the inner town on that of Kalsa.) It had a population of approximately 70,000 and was one of the largest Sicilian cities still loyal to Carthage and the most important economically. The city's prosperity was based on trade and fishing, which resulted in an unusual lack of agriculture and the area immediately around the city was thickly forested, even close to the gates. The city was surrounded and blockaded, and siege engines set up. These made a breach in the walls which the Romans stormed, capturing the outer town and giving no quarter. The inner town promptly surrendered. The 14,000 inhabitants who could afford it ransomed themselves and the remaining 13,000 were sold into slavery. Much of western inland Sicily then went over to the Romans: Ietas, Solous, Petra, and Tyndaris all came to terms.

In response to these events on Sicily the Carthaginians despatched Hasdrubal to Sicily, probably in 254 BC, with the 5,000 infantry and 500 cavalry they had earlier withdrawn and a reinforcement of 140 elephants. The Romans avoided battle between 254 and 251 BC; according to Polybius because they feared the war elephants which the Carthaginians had shipped to Sicily. Bagnall suggests that survivors of the battle against Xanthippus passed on "horrific stories" of the effectiveness of the Carthaginian cavalry and elephants in open battle. In consequence Hasdrubal, probably with a smaller army than the Romans, dominated the plains; the Romans stayed on higher and broken ground, where much of the effect of the cavalry and elephants would have been nullified. Both sides declined to face the other on their favoured terrain. Hasdrubal spent the time drilling and training his army, including the elephants. In 252 BC the Romans captured Thermae and Lipara, which had been isolated by the fall of Panormus.

=== Battle of Panormus ===
In late summer 250 BC Hasdrubal, hearing that one consul (Gaius Furius Pacilus) had left Sicily for Rome with half of the Roman army, marched out from the major Carthaginian stronghold of Lilybaeum towards Panormus with 30,000 men and between 60 and 142 elephants. Halting some distance away, he devastated the harvest in the territories of Rome's newly allied cities, in an attempt to provoke the Roman commander, Lucius Caecilius Metellus, into battle. The Roman troops amounted to two legions, and they had been dispersed to gather the harvest. Metellus withdrew them in front of the advancing Carthaginians and they retreated into Panormus. This timidity was what Hasdrubal had come to expect, and he advanced down the Oreto valley, continuing to despoil the countryside. The Oreto reached the sea immediately south of Panormus, and once there Hasdrubal ordered part of his army to cross the river and advance up to the city wall.

Once the elephants had crossed, or were crossing, the river, Metellus sent his light infantry to skirmish with the Carthaginians and impede their passage. These light troops hurled javelins at the Carthaginians, and had been instructed to concentrate on their elephants. Panormus was a major supply depot, and townspeople were employed in carrying bundles of javelins from stocks within the city to the foot of the walls so the Roman skirmishers were constantly resupplied. The ground between the river and the city was covered with earthworks, some constructed during the Roman siege and some part of the city's defensive works, which provided cover for the Romans and made it difficult for the elephants to advance, or even manoeuvre. The elephants' mahouts, eager to demonstrate their charges' prowess to Hasdrubal, nevertheless drove them forward. Some accounts also have missiles being hurled down from the city walls at them. Peppered with missiles and unable to retaliate, the elephants panicked and fled through the Carthaginian infantry behind them.

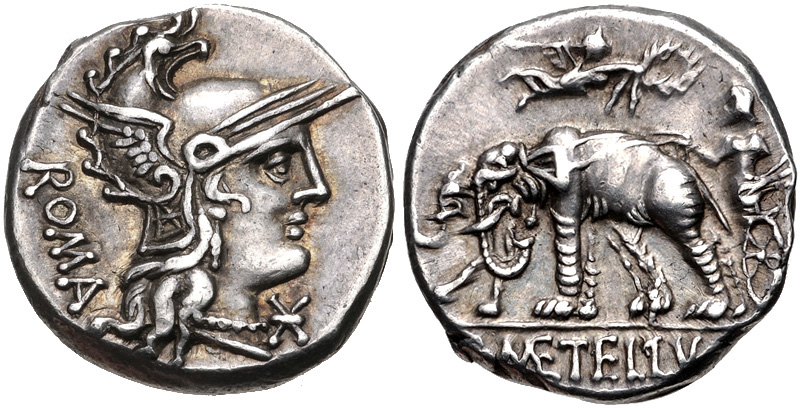
Denarius of C. Caecilius Metellus Caprarius (125 BC). The reverse alludes to the triumph of his ancestor Lucius Caecilius Metellus which featured the elephants he captured at Panormus.

Metellus had concealed himself and a large part of his army either in the woods just outside the city gate, or immediately inside the gates; in either case this meant he was upstream from where the Carthaginian army was fording the river. From here Metellus fed fresh troops into the large-scale skirmish under the city walls. When the elephants broke, disorganising a large part of the Carthaginian army and demoralising all of it, Metellus ordered an attack on its left flank. The Carthaginians fled; those who attempted to fight were cut down. Hasdrubal escaped. Metellus did not permit a pursuit, but did capture ten elephants in the immediate aftermath and, according to some accounts, the rest of the surviving animals over the succeeding days.

Contemporary accounts do not report the other losses of either side, although those of the Carthaginians are thought to have been heavy. Modern historians consider later claims of 20,000–30,000 Carthaginian casualties improbable. Similarly, later accounts that most of the large Celtic contingent in the Carthaginian army were drunk when the battle began are usually dismissed; as is the suggestion that a Carthaginian fleet took part in the operation, causing heavy casualties when many fleeing soldiers ran into the sea hoping to be taken off by their ships. Panormus was the fourth and final set piece battle of the war.

== Death and afterwards ==
As was the Carthaginian custom after a defeat, Hasdrubal was recalled to Carthage to be executed.

After his success at Panormus, Metellus received a triumph in Rome on 7 September 250 BC, during which he paraded with the elephants he had captured at Panormus, who were then slaughtered in the Circus Maximus. The defeat, and especially the loss of the elephants, resulted in the Romans feeling freer to manoeuvre on the plains, and the Carthaginians no longer being willing to challenge them. Henceforth the Carthaginian approach was purely defensive. The war ended nine years later in 241 BC with a Roman victory.

== Notes, citations and sources ==
=== Sources ===
- Andrei, Cristina; Nedu, Decebal (2010). "The Campaign of Marcus Atilius Regulus in Africa, Military Operations by Sea and by Land (256−255 B.C.)". Constanta Maritime University Annals. Constanta, Romania: Constanta Maritime University: 206–209. ISSN 1582-3601.
- Bagnall, Nigel (1999). The Punic Wars: Rome, Carthage and the Struggle for the Mediterranean. London: Pimlico. ISBN 978-0-7126-6608-4.
- Casson, Lionel (1991). The Ancient Mariners (2nd ed.). Princeton, New Jersey: Princeton University Press. ISBN 978-0-691-06836-7.
- Crawford, Michael (1974). Roman Republican Coinage. Cambridge: Cambridge University Press. OCLC 859598398.
- Erdkamp, Paul (2015) [2011]. "Manpower and Food Supply in the First and Second Punic Wars". In Hoyos, Dexter (ed.). A Companion to the Punic Wars. Chichester, West Sussex: John Wiley. pp. 58–76. ISBN 978-1-1190-2550-4.
- Goldsworthy, Adrian (2006). The Fall of Carthage: The Punic Wars 265–146 BC. London: Phoenix. ISBN 978-0-304-36642-2.
- Hoyos, Dexter (2007). Truceless War: Carthage's Fight for Survival, 241 to 237 BC. Leiden; Boston: Brill. ISBN 978-90-474-2192-4.
- Hoyos, Dexter (2010). The Carthaginians. London: Routledge. ISBN 978-1-136-96862-4.
- Kistler, John (2006). War Elephants. Westport, Connecticut: Praeger. ISBN 978-0-8032-6004-7.
- Lazenby, John (1996). The First Punic War: A Military History. Stanford, California: Stanford University Press. ISBN 978-0-8047-2673-3.
- Miles, Richard (2011). Carthage Must be Destroyed. London: Penguin. ISBN 978-0-14-101809-6.
- Morgan, M. Gwyn (1972). "Polybius and the Date of the Battle of Panormus". The Classical Quarterly. 22 (1): 121–129. doi:10.1017/S0009838800034091. hdl:2152/24128. JSTOR 637895. S2CID 170609765.
- Rankov, Boris (2015) [2011]. "A War of Phases: Strategies and Stalemates". In Hoyos, Dexter (ed.). A Companion to the Punic Wars. Chichester, West Sussex: John Wiley. pp. 149–166. ISBN 978-1-4051-7600-2.
- Scullard, H. H. (2006) [1989]. "Carthage and Rome". In Walbank, F. W.; Astin, A. E.; Frederiksen, M. W. & Ogilvie, R. M. (eds.). Cambridge Ancient History Part 2. Vol. VII (2nd ed.). Cambridge: Cambridge University Press. pp. 486–569. ISBN 978-0-521-23446-7.
- Tipps, G. K. (1985). "The Battle of Ecnomus". Historia: Zeitschrift für Alte Geschichte. 34 (4): 432–465. JSTOR 4435938.
- Tipps, G. K. (2003). "The Defeat of Regulus". The Classical World. 96 (4): 375–385. doi:10.2307/4352788. JSTOR 4352788.
- Walbank, F. W. (1957). A Historical Commentary on Polybius. Vol. 1. Oxford: Clarendon Press. ISBN 978-0-19-814152-5.
- Walbank, Frank (1959). "Naval Triaii". The Classical Review. 64 (1): 10–11. doi:10.1017/S0009840X00092258. JSTOR 702509. S2CID 162463877.
- Warmington, Brian (1993) [1960]. Carthage. New York: Barnes & Noble, Inc. ISBN 978-1-56619-210-1.
