= Legionario =

Legionario may refer to:

== Films ==
- Legionario (2017 film), a Spanish film by Mexican-born director Eduardo H. Garza
- Il Legionario, a 2021 Italian film
- Legionario (2025 film), a British-French film directed by David and Eric Cummings

== Other uses ==
- Italian destroyer Legionario, an Italian Navy ship built in 1942
- Legionario, a word used to describe traitors, derived from the 19th-century Paraguayan Legion
- Spanish Legion (Legionarios)

== See also ==
- Legionnaire (disambiguation)
