= Legionnaire (disambiguation) =

A Legionnaire is a member of the French army corps (French Foreign Legion).

Legionnaire or Legionnaires may also refer to:

== Member of an organization ==
- A member of the American Legion
- A member of the Iron Guard (The Legion of the Archangel Michael)
- A member of the Spanish Legion
- A misused term for a legionary, an infantry soldier of the ancient Roman Army
- A member of the fictional Legion of Super-Heroes in DC Comics
- A member of the Legion of Mary

== Arts and entertainment ==
=== Films ===
- A Legionnaire, a 1936 French comedy film
- Legionnaire (film), a 1998 American war drama starring Jean Claude Van Damme
- The Legionnaire (Il Legionario), a 2021 Italian film

=== Other arts and entertainment ===
- Legionnaire (role-playing game), a 1990 science fiction game
- Legionnaire (video game), a 1982 8-bit computer game
- The Legionnaires, a 1968 novel by Swedish author Per Olov Enquist

== Other uses ==
- Legionnaire (passenger train), later Minnesotan, a train operated by Chicago Great Western Railway 1925–1949
- Legionnaire hat, a wide-brimmed hat designed to provide sun protection

== See also ==
- Legion (disambiguation)
- Legionario (disambiguation)
- Legionnaires' disease
- Legionary
