= Eduardo H. Garza =

Mexican film director (born 1978)

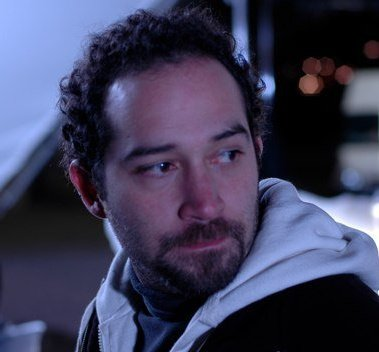
- Eduardo H. Garza on a film set in Paris, France
- Born: 1978 or 1979 (age 47–48)
- Occupations: Film director, screenwriter, editor
- Years active: 2007–present
- Notable work: Legionario, Vert D'Automne

Eduardo H. Garza (1978 or 1979) is a Spanish and Mexican film director, screenwriter, producer, and film editor. His debut feature film is Legionario, which was released in 2017.

== Early life and education ==
Eduardo H. Garza was born in Monterrey, Mexico, in 1978 or 1979.

He earned a Bachelor of Business Administration at the University of Monterrey (UdeM), with a speciality in film direction, and later studied in France.

== Career ==
Garza worked in advertising and on some Mexican film sets. HE started out as a technician and later became an assistant director.

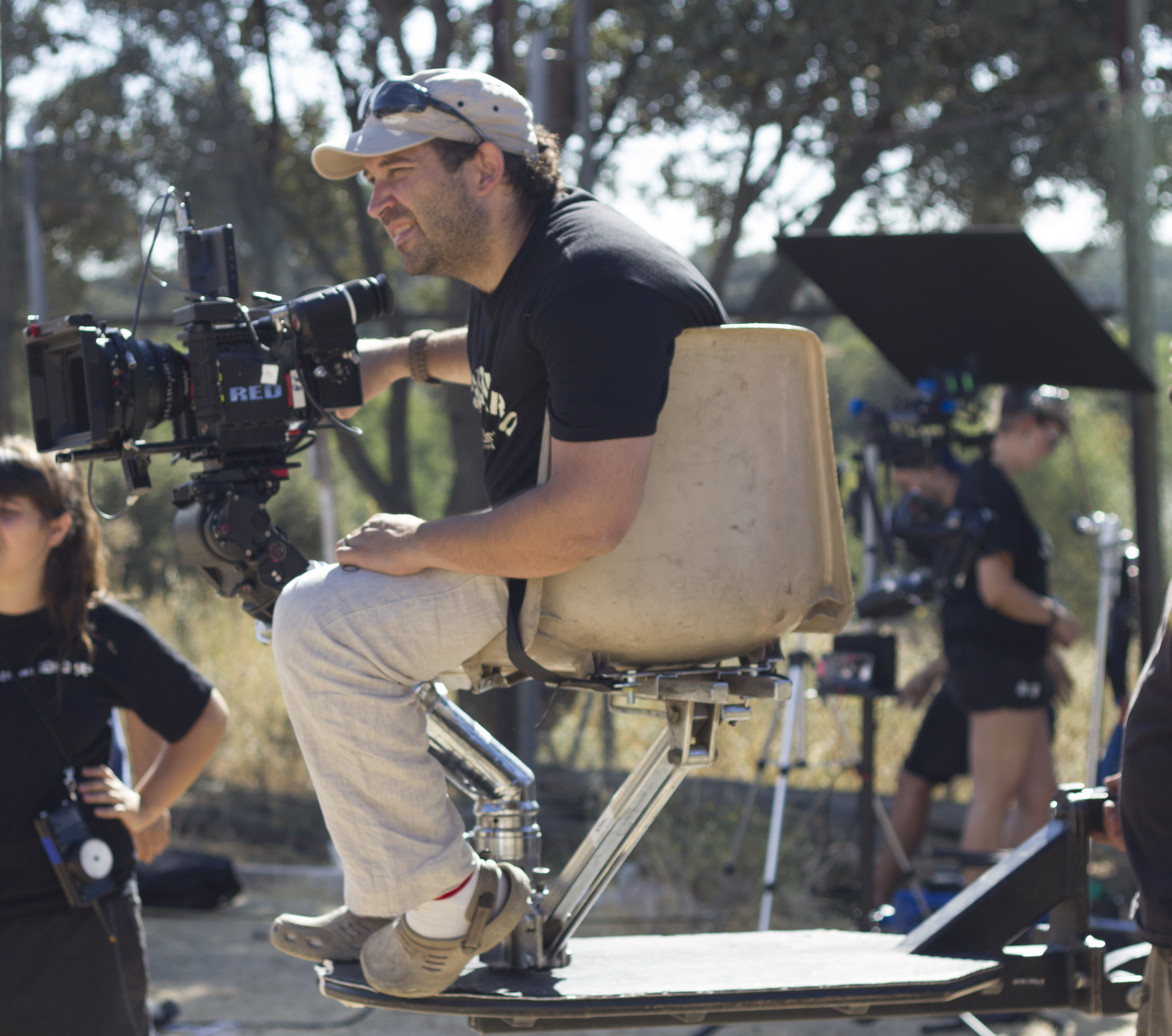
Eduardo H. Garza shoots a scene for Legionario in Madrid, Spain.

== Legionario ==
Legionario, his first feature film, began shooting in 2014 and was finished in December 2016. The film was self-produced by him and his wife. Garza wrote, directed, photographed, and edited the film, and did 80% of the visual effects compositing, which was produced on a very tight budget. The Spanish Army collaborated with the filmmaker by allowing him to shoot on Chinook helicopters and in some of their bases in Madrid. The rest of the military scenes in Afghanistan were shot in a paintball play zone in Spain. The film had limited release in Spanish cinemas on 17 February 2017.

Spanish actor Raúl Tejón stars in the film.

== Personal life ==
Garza married Sylvia Vivanco, who is Spanish, and moved to Spain around 2007.
