= Legionario (2017 film) =

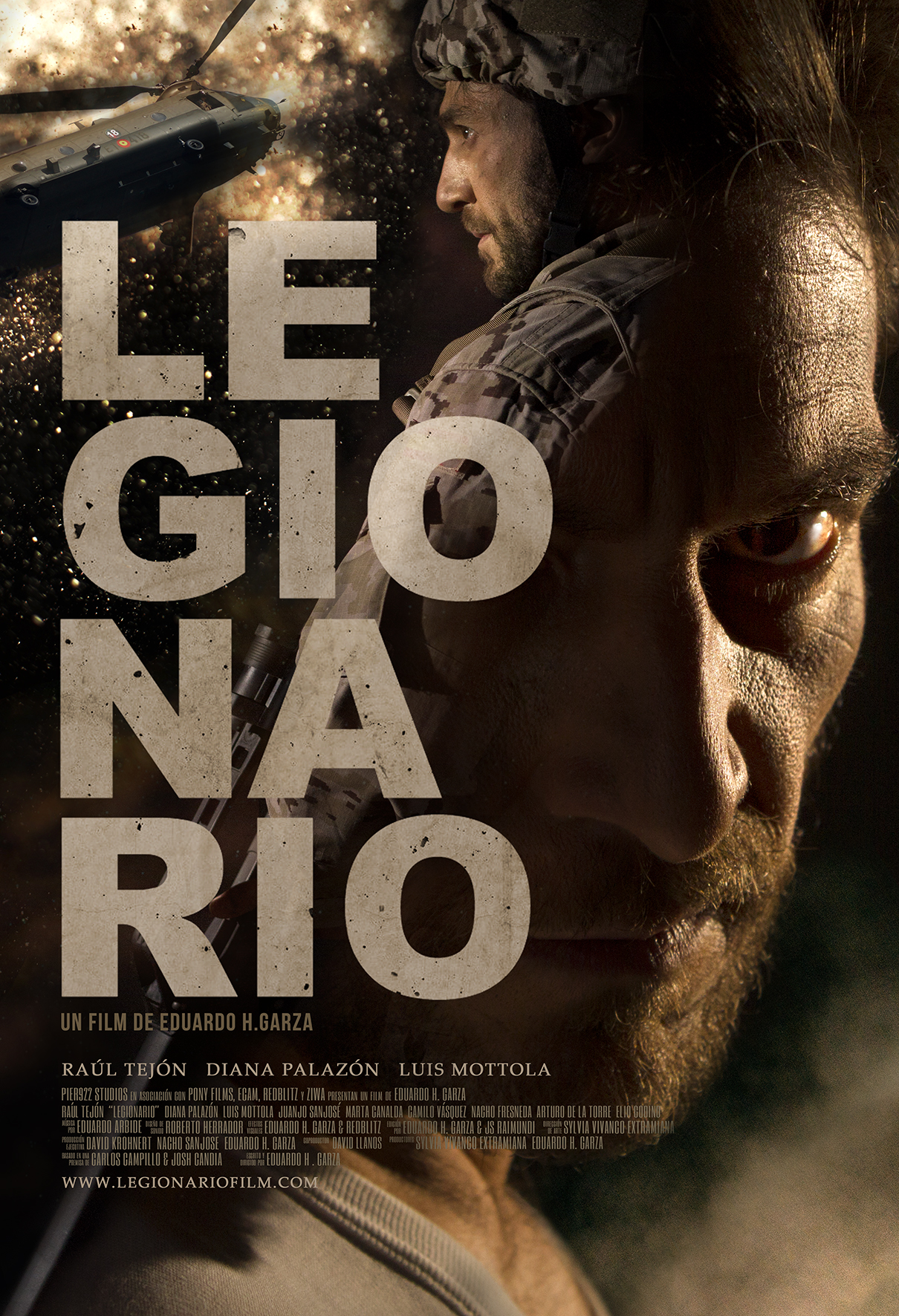
- Directed by: Eduardo H. Garza
- Story by: Eduardo H. Garza
- Produced by: Sylvia Vivanco, Eduardo H. Garza
- Distributed by: Pier 922 Studios
- Release date: 10 February 2017
- Running time: 80 minutes
- Country: Spain
- Language: Spanish

Legionario is a Spanish independent film directed by Eduardo H. Garza. It is his first feature film, co-produced with his wife Sylvia Vivanco.

== Plot ==
The morning after his homecoming party from his last tour in Afghanistan, a Spanish special forces soldier wakes up besides the corpse of a young woman, who is not his fiancée. Desperate to find his girl he decides to look for her knowing that he could be accused of a murder that seems like the perfect setup.

== Production ==
In the film stars Raúl Tejón, Diana Palazón and Luis Mottola. It was shot during August 2014 and was finished in December 2016.

The Afghan town scenes were shot in the outskirts of Madrid on a paintball zone that was covered with chroma screens in order to replace the background in postproduction. The main story was shot on the known building in the city of Madrid called "Torre Metropolitana" which is a 24-story building. The Matte paintings and some aerial shots were done in the south of the island of Gran Canaria.

The Spanish Army collaborated with the filmmakers by letting them shoot inside two of their bases. El Goloso and la FAMET. Where the filmmakers had the chance to use URO VAMTAC vehicles and flew on Spanish Army's Chinook helicopters for some of their scenes.

== Release ==
The film had limited release in Spanish cinemas on 17 February 2017, followed by release on ITunes in 21 countries a week later.
