= Legionary =

Professional soldier of the Roman army

Not to be confused with other definitions of the word Legionary (or Legionnaire)

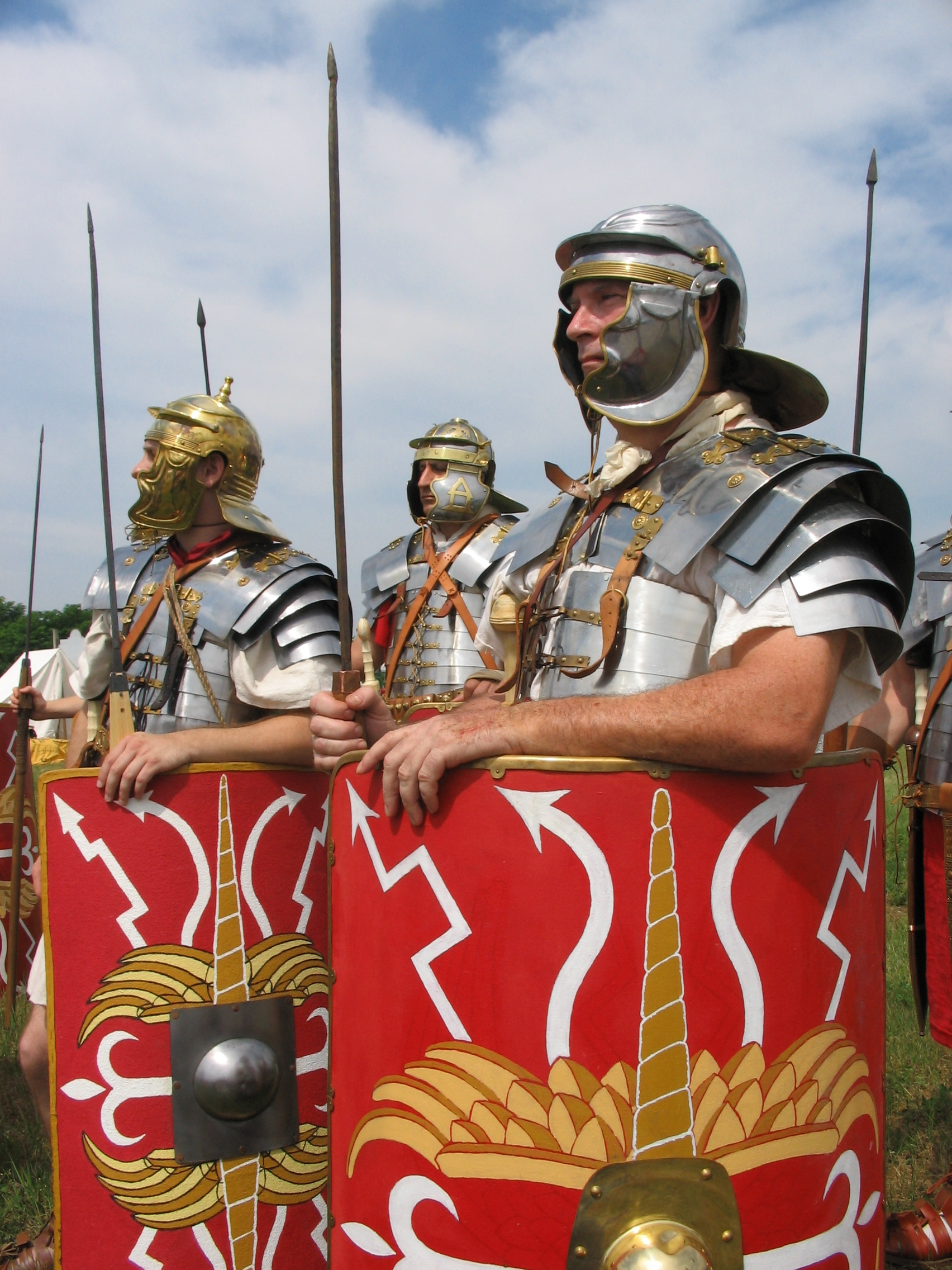
A recreation of Roman legionaries wearing the lorica segmentata, 1st–3rd century. Other equipment in view include the galea (helmet), pilum (spear) and scutum (shield)

The Roman legionary (in Latin legionarius; pl.: legionarii) was a citizen soldier of the Roman army. These soldiers would conquer and defend the territories of ancient Rome during the Republic and Principate eras, alongside auxiliary and cavalry detachments. At its height, Roman Legionnaires were viewed as the foremost fighting force in the Roman world, with commentators such as Vegetius praising their fighting effectiveness centuries after the classical Roman legionary disappeared.

Roman legionnaires were recruited from Roman citizens under age 45. They were first predominantly made up of recruits from Roman Italy, but more were recruited from the provinces as time went on. As legionnaires moved into newly conquered provinces, they helped Romanize the native population and helped integrate the disparate regions of the Roman Empire into one polity. They enlisted in a legion for 25 years of service, a change from the early practice of enlisting only for a campaign. Legionnaires were expected to fight, but they also built much of the infrastructure of the Roman Empire and served as a policing force in the provinces. They built large public works projects, such as walls, bridges, and roads. The legionary's last five years of service were on lighter duties. Once retired, a Roman legionary received a parcel of land or its equivalent in money and often became a politically prominent member of society.

== History ==
=== Inception: Marius's reforms ===
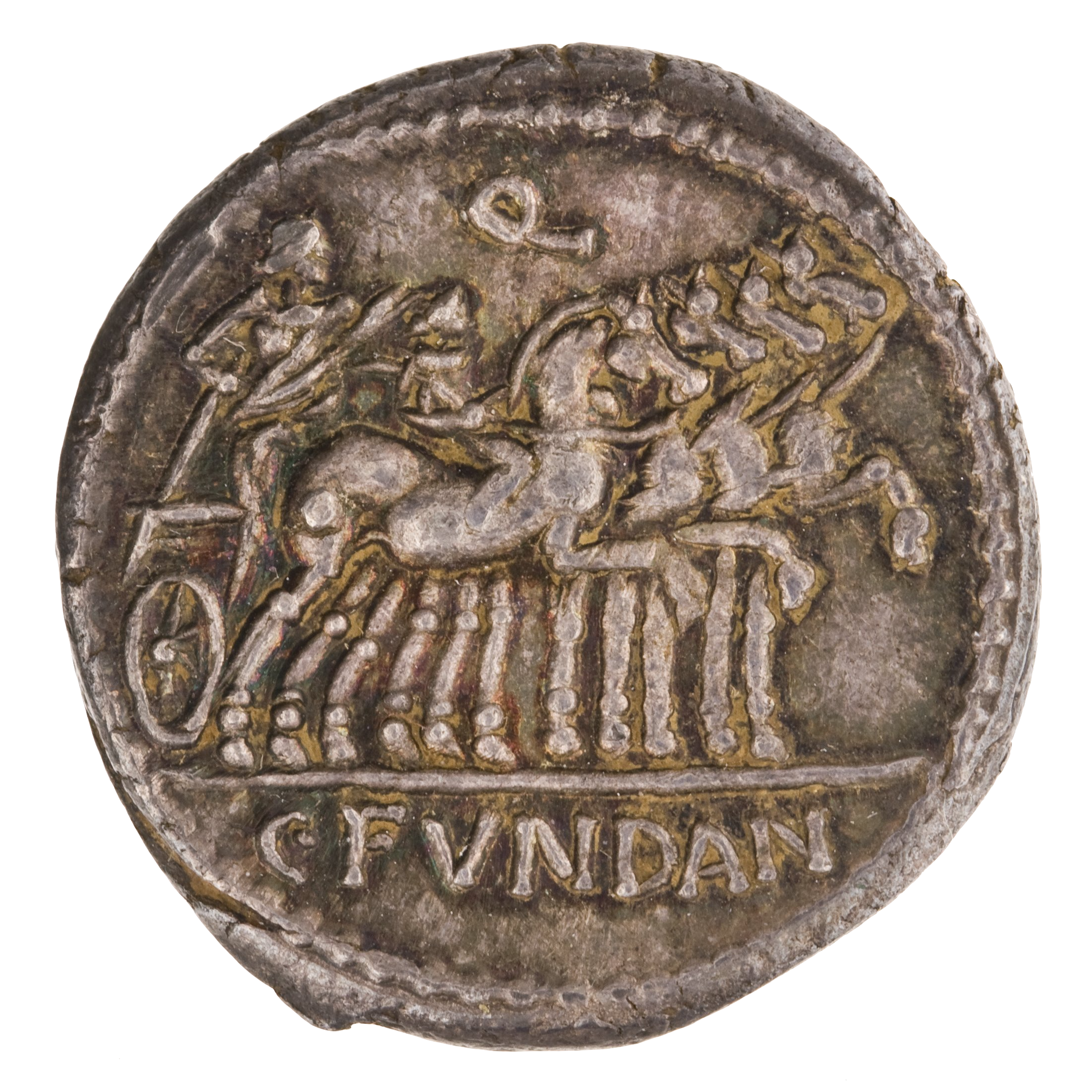
Gaius Marius, depicted as a triumphator in a coin minted by Gaius Fundanius in 101 BC. He triumphed due to his victory in the Cimbric War.

The Marian reforms were putative changes to the composition and operation of the Roman army during the late Roman Republic usually attributed to Gaius Marius (a general who was consul in 107, 104–100, and 86 BC). The most important of these concerned the altering of the socio-economic background of the soldiery. Other changes were supposed to have included the introduction of the cohort; the institution of a single form of heavy infantry with uniform equipment; the universal adoption of the eagle standard; and the abolition of the citizen cavalry. It was commonly believed that Marius changed the soldiers' socio-economic background by allowing citizens without property to join the Roman army, a process called "proletarianisation". This was thought to have created a semi-professional class of soldiers motivated by land grants; these soldiers in turn became clients of their generals, who then used them to overthrow the republic.

Belief in a comprehensive scheme of reforms under Marius emerged in 1840s German scholarship, which posited that any changes in the Roman army between the times of Polybius and Marius were attributable to a single reform event. This belief was spread relatively uncritically and was accepted as largely proven by the 1850s and through much of the 20th century. There is, however, little ancient evidence for any permanent or significant change to recruitment practice in Marius' time. The occurrence of such a comprehensive reform led by Marius is no longer widely accepted by specialists; 21st-century scholars have called the reforms a "construct of modern scholarship".

Other reforms to the army's operations and equipment, said to have been implemented by Marius, are also largely rejected by scholars. Few of them have any basis in the ancient and archaeological evidence. Others are wrongly dated or misattributed. Changes in the Roman army of the late republic did occur, but appear to have happened later than at the end of the 2nd century BC. Rather, these shifts were during the Social War and following civil wars, and emerged from circumstance rather than a reformist Marian vision.

=== During the Principate ===
As Augustus consolidated power in 27 BC and founded the Principate, he further professionalized the Roman legionary and sought to break the legionary's dependence on his general. Under him, a legionary's term of service was raised to 25 years (before that, a legionary's average term of service was only 10 years) and pay was standardized throughout the legions. The Roman legionaries were also guaranteed a land grant or a cash payment at the end of his service, making the Roman legionary less dependent on generals for rewards after campaigns. Augustus also changed the sacramentum so that soldiers swore allegiance only to the emperor, and not to the general. Thus, Augustus managed to end the civil wars which defined the late Roman Republic and created an army that was broadly loyal to only the emperor.

Legionnaires would expand Rome's borders to include lower Britannia, Dacia, North Africa, and more through military campaigns under Augustus and future emperors.

=== Decline ===
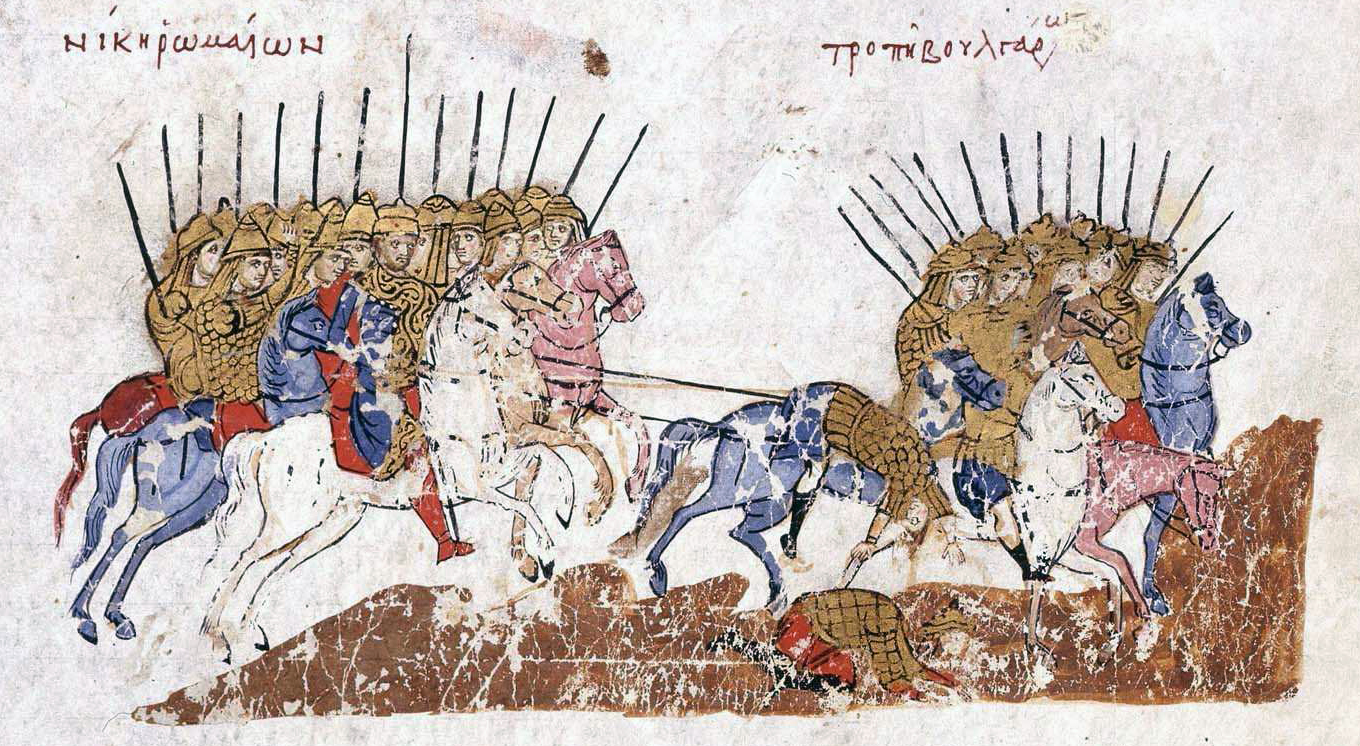
Clibinarii, a type of heavy cavalry in the late Roman Empire, grew in prominence along with other forms of cavalry as the Roman legionary declined.

From the reign of Septimus Severus onward, the Roman legionary gradually lost his preeminence. Though there were multiple causes for this decline, all pointed to the gradual degradation of loyalty and/or discipline. Septimus Severus, perhaps unwittingly, began this decline when he lavished his legionaries with donatives and pay increases, recognising that they were his key to becoming and staying emperor. However, this proved detrimental to the discipline of the legionaries, as they began to expect more and more rewards from their emperors. Under Caracalla, Septimus Severus's successor, all freedmen in the Roman Empire became Roman citizens, effectively erasing the distinction between auxiliaries and legionnaires. This, coinciding with the continued expansion of the Roman army, meant recruits of more dubious standards joined the legions, decreasing the quality of the Roman legionary further.

During the 3rd Century Crisis, a more mobile army became necessary, as threats arose across the long borders of the Roman Empire. As such, mounted cavalry became essential to respond to the varied challenges to the empire. Because of this, Roman heavy infantry faded further from dominance. By the 4th century, Roman infantry lacked much of the body armor of the classical legionary and used darts rather than the pila of their predecessors.

== Functions ==
Though the legionary was first and foremost a soldier, he provided a variety of other critical functions. Lacking a professional police force, governors would use legionaries to keep the peace and protect critical facilities. As the Roman empire lacked a large civil administration, the army would often be given many administrative positions. High ranking soldiers often acted as judges in disputes among local populations and the army was an important component of tax collection. Legionaries also served to spread Roman culture throughout the provinces where they were stationed. As legionaries settled in the provinces, towns sprang up around them, often becoming large cities. In this way, as legionaries co-mingled and intermarried with the local populace, they helped Romanize the provinces they protect.

Roman legionaries served as a source of labor and expertise as well. As such, much of the infrastructure which connected the empire was built by legionaries. Roads, canals, and bridges were built by legionaries as well as more defensive structures such as fortresses and walls. Hadrian's wall, a monumental example of Roman engineering, was built by the three legions stationed in the area. Legionaries were not just limited to building large-scale engineering projects. Surveyors, doctors, artisans, and engineers within the army would be used for a variety of different civil services along with their normal military role.

== Immunes ==
Regular trained legionaries were known as milites and were the equivalent in rank of the modern private. Included in the ranks, aside from the milites, were the immunes, specialist soldiers with secondary roles such as engineer, artilleryman, drill and weapons instructor, carpenter and medic. These men were still fully trained legionaries, however, and would fight in the ranks if called upon. They were excused from some of the more arduous tasks such as drill and fatigues and received better pay than their comrades in arms.

== Recruitment ==
Though Roman legionaries were predominantly made up of volunteer citizens, conscription of recruits continued through Republic era and into the Principate, especially in times of crisis. This meant that levees remained a significant part of the Roman legions. With the state providing the equipment to the recruits and no property requirements, even the poorest Roman citizens were able to join the legions. However, the army was viewed as an honorable and valued profession. With a steady pay, good retirement benefits, and even certain legal advantages, a legionary had many perks that common citizens found desirable. As such, though poor citizens could join the military, members from across the plebeian class were found in the Roman legions. Indeed, the army served as one of the few avenues of upward mobility in the Roman world.

The army actively sought out recruits with useful skills such as smiths, carpenters, and butchers. Though not required, literacy was useful since promotion to higher ranks such as centurion required a knowledge of writing. During the Later Republic, Roman legionaries predominantly came from the areas surrounding Rome. However, as Rome expanded, recruits began to come from other areas in Italy. Slowly, recruits came from the regions where the legions were stationed rather than from Italy itself. By the reign of Trajan, there were 4–5 legionaries originating from the provinces for every legionary originating from Italy.

== Equipment ==
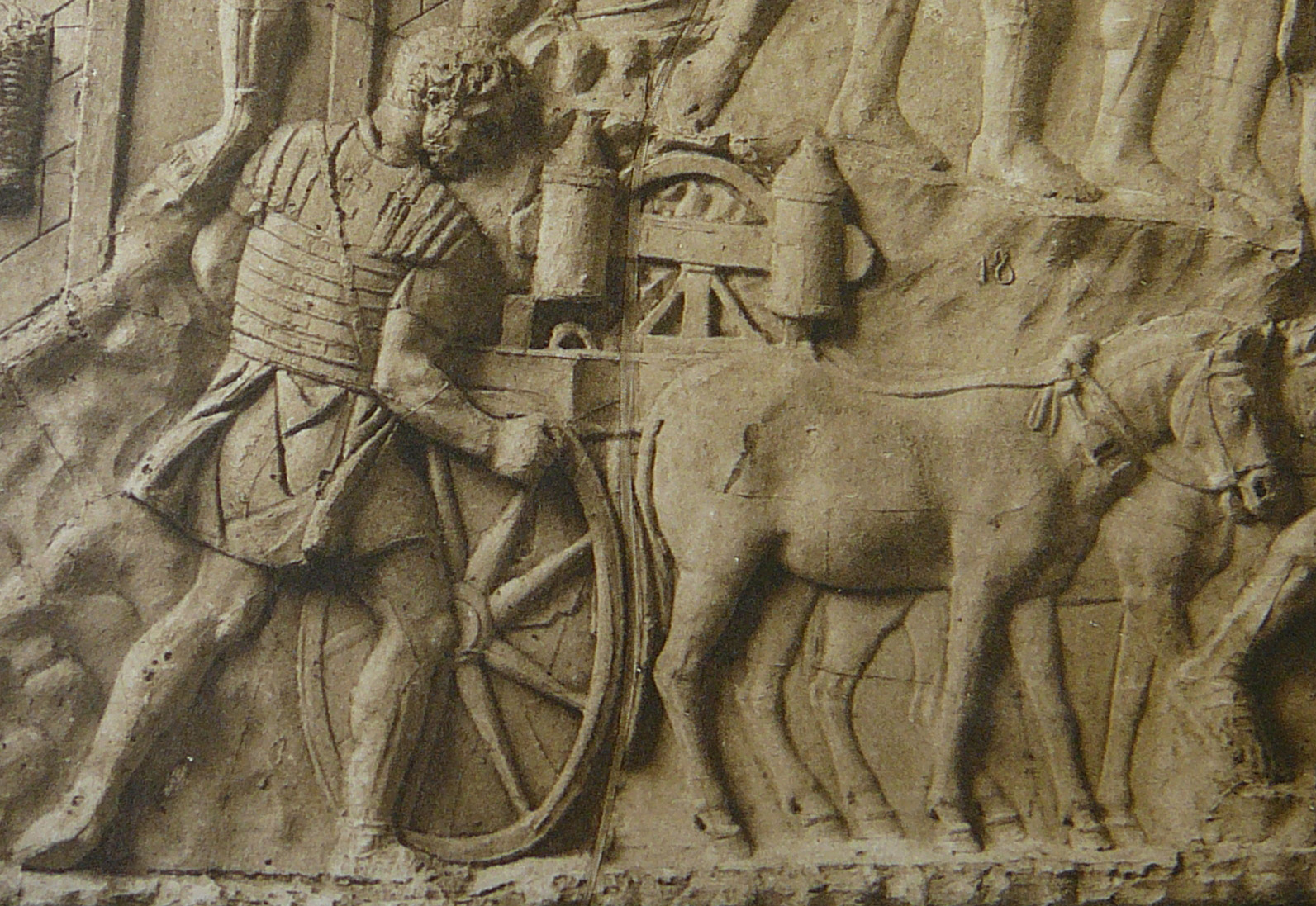
Relief from Trajan's Column showing a legionary with lorica segmentata manning a carroballista

When on the march in hostile territory, the legionary would carry or wear full armour, supplies and equipment. This commonly consisted of chain (lorica hamata), scaled (lorica squamata), or in the 1st–3rd century sectioned (lorica segmentata) armour, shield (scutum), helmet (galea), two javelins (one heavy pilum and one light verutum), a short sword (gladius), a dagger (pugio), a belt (balteus), a pair of heavy sandals (caligae), a pair of greaves, a pair of manicas, a marching pack (sarcina), about fourteen days' worth of food, a waterskin (bladder for posca), cooking equipment, two stakes (sudes murale) for the construction of palisades, a shovel, and a wicker basket.

After the military reforms of Emperor Claudius (circa 41 AD), each legion would also be requisitioned a certain number of artillery pieces. Each cohort (roughly 480 men) would receive one ballista and each centuria (roughly 100 men) would receive one carroballista. In a standard legionary formation of ten cohorts and sixty centuriae, a legion would be equipped with ten ballistae and sixty carroballistae.

== Battle and combat ==
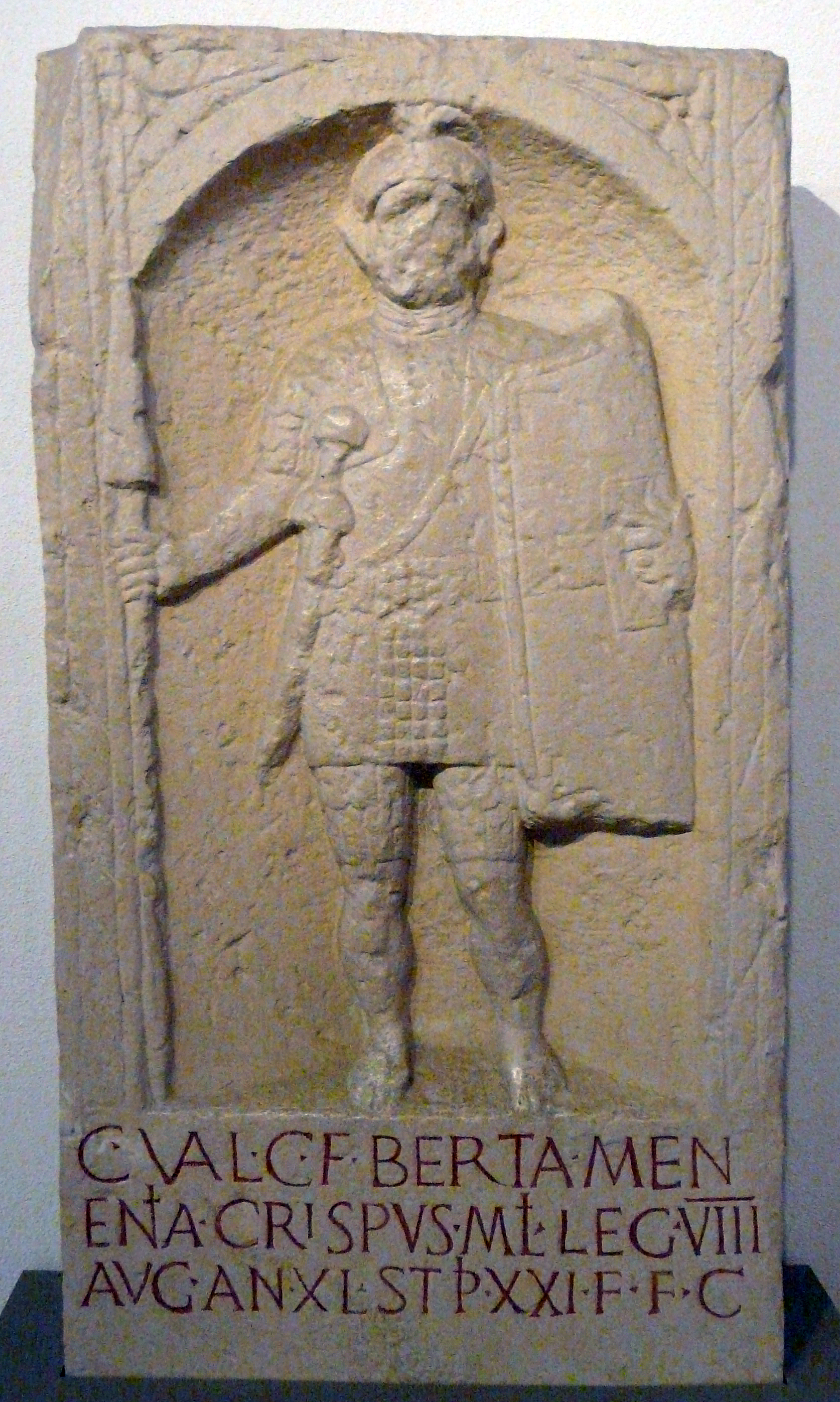
Gravestone of a legionary

=== Maintaining morale ===
The Roman legionary fought first and foremost with his contubernium, the basic eight man unit of the Roman army. The men of the same contubernium fought, slept, ate, and trained together. This strong sense of camaraderie gave Roman legionaries a sense of pride and kept them fighting on the battlefield. The standard bearers, signiferi, were of great importance in keeping Roman soldiers in the battle. The loss of a standard was a disgrace to the centuria the standard belonged to. As such, standard bearers served as someone to rally around and as someone to exhort legionaries to battle.

Optiones, Roman officers at the rear of a formation, had many essential roles outside of battle. However, during battle, their task was to prevent legionaries from routing. Carrying a staff with a ball-end, an optio would force legionaries fleeing from battle back into formation. Leading at the front, centurions would fight alongside legionaries under their command, serving as a role model for his legionaries to remain in combat.

Finally, there were the rewards and punishments, which served as both incentives and deterrents for legionaries in battle. For example, the highly coveted corona civica was given to legionaries who saved a comrade in battle. However, death was the punishment for a variety of different offenses. Those who committed cowardice and dereliction of duty were stoned to death by their comrades. On very rare occasions when a whole unit displayed cowardice, the unit might be decimated, in which one out of every ten soldiers were executed. Less extreme punishments included demotions, changing the wheat rations to barley, and the removal of some identifying military gear.

=== Prelude to battle ===
Large armies would generally not begin battle immediately upon meeting. Rather, days or even weeks of redeployment and negotiation would take place before battle. Several days of maneuvering occurred before the Battle of Pharsalus began. Before battle, measures were taken to ensure legionaries were as effective as possible. These included giving legionaries their meals and resting them before the battle. Their commanders and general would also give speeches during this time. These speeches would heavily emphasize the amount of plunder and riches that winning the battle would give the legionaries, as this was a primary incentive for the legionaries to do battle. Light skirmishing would then take place, with cavalry and auxiliaries probing enemy lines before a pitched battle commenced.

=== Fighting style ===
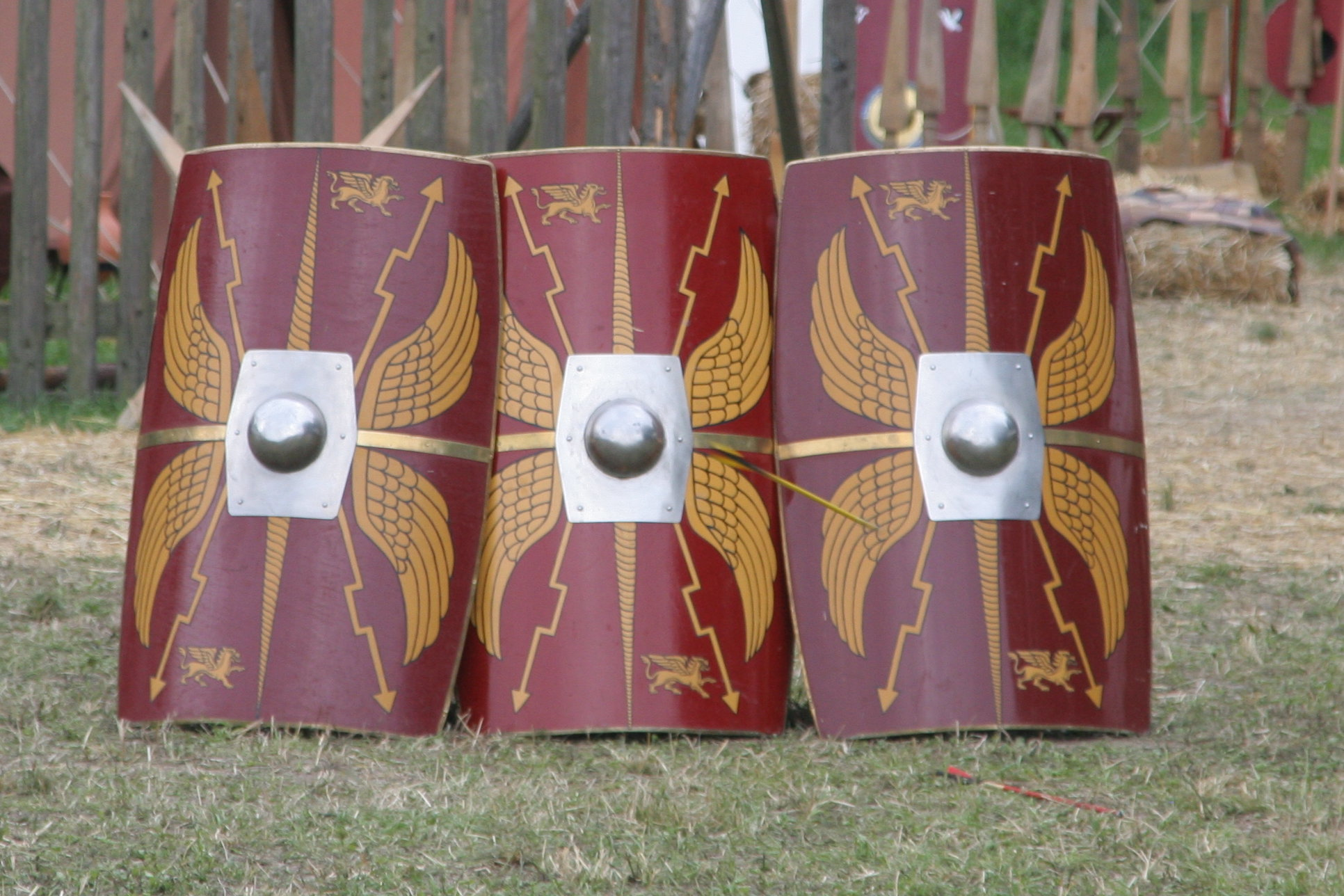
The Roman scutum ranged all the way from flat and oval to curved and rectangular as shown in the image above. The metal boss in all Roman scuta gave them an offensive capability.

The Roman legionary's three principal weapons were the pilum (javelin), scutum (shield), and gladius (short sword). Ideally, the legionaries would throw their pila first as they approached the enemy army. These pila could often penetrate enemy shields and hit the soldiers behind them. Even if the pila failed to pierce the shields, the neck of the javelin would bend, making the shield useless. This then made the enemy vulnerable to missile fire and legionary attack. The disruption and damage wrought by pila would then be followed by the charge of Roman legionaries.

Though Roman scutum had various different designs, they all shared a large metal boss in the center of the shield. This allowed the legionary to not only use the scutum as defensive equipment but also as an offensive weapon. Legionaries would have used this iron boss to punch and shove the enemy combatants. Accompanying this was the gladius, a primarily stabbing weapon though it could also be used to cut. These fairly simple tools combined with impressive discipline made the Roman legionary an extremely effective soldier in the ancient world.

Though there were many different formations that legionaries fought in, they tended toward close, ordered formations with gaps between formations. These gaps would allow for reserve units to enter battle or serve as avenues for skirmishing forces to retreat back behind the legionaries. During lulls in the battle, wounded soldiers could further be taken back behind battle lines through these gaps.

== Pay and conditions ==
During the Pax Romana, a rank-and-file Roman legionary would be paid 225 denarii per year. This was increased to 300 denarii during the reign of Domitian. However, during the third century crisis, inflation and chaos disrupted a legionary's pay, with emperors often letting legionaries seize goods from civilians. Their income was supplemented by donatives from emperors either to secure a legion's loyalty or to award them after a successful campaign. Plunder and loot also supplement a legionary's income and is used as a large incentive for soldiers to follow their emperor in campaigns. At the end of their years of service, Roman legionaries received a small allotment of land or a monetary equivalent.

As the Roman empire solidified, permanent legionary fortresses were constructed and many grew into towns. These fortresses contained bathhouses, taverns, and even amphitheaters where festivals and animal displays were held. However, legionaries were not allowed to legally marry until the reign of Septimius Severus (though their spouses were often recognized), most likely because of the implicit necessity to care for the widow in the event of a legionary's death.

=== Training and discipline ===
When first enlisted, a fresh Roman recruit (tiro) was not given real weapons to train with. Instead, he was given wooden swords and shields designed to be twice the weight of their counterparts in battle. This allowed the recruit to develop strength as he trained with these wooden weapons. Alongside battle training, the recruit was also taught other necessary skills such as swimming and setting up camp. Most of all, however, the recruit was taught discipline, and was drilled twice a day during his training period. After this period, which could last up to six months, the recruit would become a milis and sent to his respective legion.

The Roman soldier underwent especially rigorous training throughout his military career; discipline was the base of the army's success, and the soldiers were relentlessly and constantly trained with weapons and especially with drill—forced marches with full load and in tight formation were frequent. As discipline was important, infractions were heavily punished by the centurions. Punishments could range from being obliged to spend the night outside the protective security of a fortified camp, through being beaten with clubs (fustuarium—a common punishment for 'slowpokes' during long marches), to the stoning of individuals or unit executions involving decimation. However, honors, rewards, and promotions were frequently awarded to legionaries who distinguished themselves in battle or through exemplary service.

One of the goals for strong disciplinary training was to expel fear from a Roman soldier. Fear, and the panic that often follows, is a devastating force to an army on the battlefield. The Romans aimed to remove fear through strict physical and mental training. However, a different fear was used to motivate a soldier in spite of the fear of battle; that was the fear of harsh punishment by their commanding officers. In the words of Josephus "they are moreover hardened for war by fear; for their laws inflict capital punishments, not only for soldiers running away from the ranks, but for slothfulness and inactivity".

=== Diet ===
A Roman legionary had two or three meals per day: The prandium (breakfast) and the cena (dinner). For these meals, the soldiers were issued regular rations consisting mainly of wheat, which composed roughly 60–70% of a soldier's total rations. This would be consumed in the form of either bread or porridge. However, while on campaign, the soldiers would cook their wheat rations into hardtack, a long-lasting biscuit.

Supplementing the soldier's wheat rations was the cibaria, rations other than grain. This included a variety of foodstuffs but mainly wine, vinegar, vegetables (largely beans or lentils), salt, salt-pork, cheese, and olive oil. However, this did not include fruit. Through foraging, trade with merchants, requisitioning, or raiding during campaigns, the Roman legionary could obtain other foodstuffs not included in his rations. In combination, the average soldier's diet was generally nutritious and filling.

=== Healthcare ===
Permanent Roman forts would contain hospitals, where doctors (medici) operated on wounded, injured, or sick legionaries. These medical personnel also isolated sick soldiers, thereby reducing the chance of a possibly infectious disease spreading through the army. Roman forts and camps were also planned in such a way as to minimize the spread of water-borne illnesses, which ravaged many ancient armies. Engineers took special care in piping fresh water to the camps and carrying sewage downstream of any watering places. Those legionaries who were seriously and permanently wounded or injured would be granted missio causaria, or a medical discharge. This discharge would come with many benefits including exemption from some taxes and some civic duties.

== See also ==
- Castra
- Comitatenses
- Limitanei
- List of Roman army unit types
- List of Roman legions
- Military history of ancient Rome
- Legionnaire (disambiguation)

== Sources ==
- Armstrong, Jeremy; Fronda, Michael P, eds. (2020). Romans at war: soldiers, citizens, and society in the Roman republic. Routledge. pp. 283–96. ISBN 978-1-138-48019-3.
  - Gauthier, François. "The transformation of the Roman army in the last decades of the Republic". In Armstrong & Fronda (2020), pp. 283–96.
  - Rosenstein, Nathan. "Epilogue". In Armstrong & Fronda (2020), pp. 297–307.
- Cadiou, François (2018). L'armée imaginaire: les soldats prolétaires dans les légions romaines au dernier siècle de la République. Mondes anciens (in French). Paris: Les Belles Lettres. ISBN 978-2-251-44765-0.
- Faszcza, Michał Norbert (2021). "Reformy Mariusza, czyli długie trwanie historiograficznego mitu". Res Historica (in Polish). 51: 13–42. doi:10.17951/rh.2021.51.13-42. hdl:20.500.12128/21768. ISSN 2082-6060. S2CID 237739140.
- Keaveney, Arthur (2007). The army in the Roman revolution. Routledge. ISBN 978-0-415-39486-4.
- Palao Vicente, J.J. "La muerte del soldado romano en la epigrafía del occidente del imperio (siglos I-III d.C.)". En: Perea Yébenes (ed.), El soldado romano y la muerte. Madrid : UNED, 2022. pp. 79–134. ISBN 9788436278514
- Probst, Peter (2008). "Review of "The army in the Roman revolution"". Bryn Mawr Classical Review. ISSN 1055-7660.
- Rafferty, David (2021). "Review of "L'armée imaginaire: les soldats prolétaires dans les légions romaines au dernier siècle de la République"". Bryn Mawr Classical Review. ISSN 1055-7660.
- Scullard, H H (2011) [First published by Methuen & Co, 1959]. From the Gracchi to Nero: a history of Rome from 133 BC to AD 68. London and New York: Routledge Classics. ISBN 978-0-415-58488-3.
- Taylor, Michael J (2019). "Tactical reform in the late Roman republic: the view from Italy". Historia: Zeitschrift für Alte Geschichte. 68 (1): 76–94. doi:10.25162/historia-2019-0004. ISSN 0018-2311. S2CID 165437350.

=== General books ===
- Sumner, G. and Raffaele D'Amato. Arms and Armour of the Imperial Roman Soldier. Frontline Books, 2009.
- Watson, G.R. The Roman Soldier. Cornell University Press, 1993.

=== Other books ===
- Matyszak, Philip. Legionary: the Roman soldier's (unofficial) manual. Thames & Hudson, 2009.
- Cowan, Ross, and Angus McBride. Roman Legionary: 58 BC – AD 69. Osprey Publishing, 2003.
