= Ietas =

- Iaitas, Iaeta, Ietae, Jetae
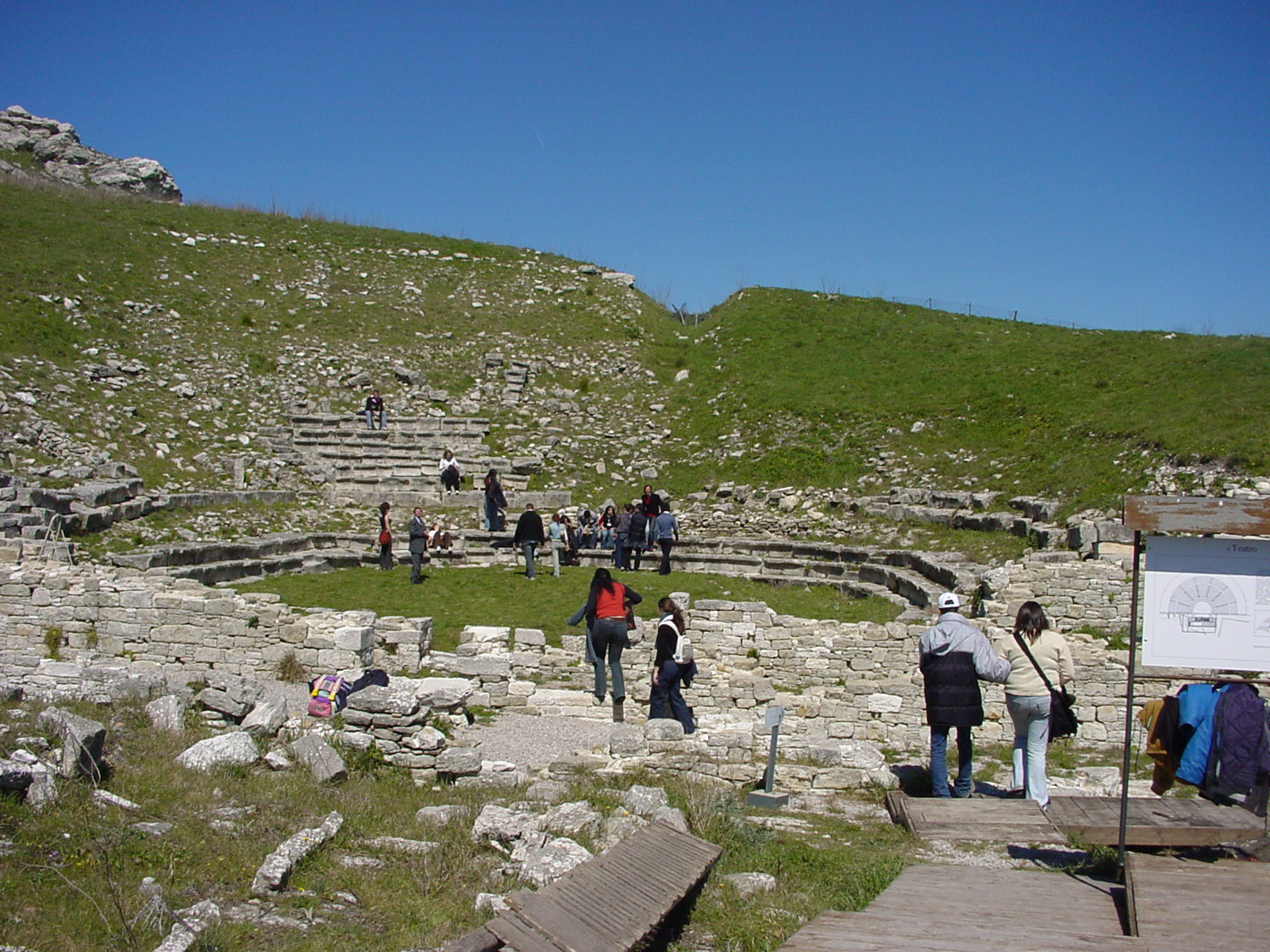
- The Greek theatre

- Location within Italy
- 37°58′0″N 13°12′0″E
- Type: Settlement
- Periods: Archaic Greek
- Cultures: Ancient Greece
- Location: San Giuseppe Jato, Italy

Ietas (or Iaitas or Iaeta or Ietae or Jetae), was an ancient town of the interior of Sicily, in the northwest of the island, not very far from Panormus (modern Palermo), in the modern comune of San Giuseppe Jato, whose name reflects the ancient town's.

The settlement's development between the fourth and third centuries BCE is a subject of debate, although evidence suggests prosperity post-Punic Wars. Infrastructure improvements continued into the second century BCE, with Ietas featuring a street system, theater, and agora by the first century BCE.

Major construction in Ietas ceased by the late first century BCE, with some projects left incomplete. Structures, including the bouleuterion and temples, fell into disuse or were destroyed between the mid-first century BCE and mid-first century CE, potentially due to earthquakes. Despite gradual abandonment, occupation persisted until at least the fifth century CE, with signs of reuse amid decay.

== History ==
Ietas was mentioned by Philistus as a fortress, and it is called by Thucydides a fortress of the Siculians (Τεῖχος τῶν Σικελῶν), which was taken by Gylippus on his march from Himera through the interior of the island towards Syracuse. It first appears as an independent city in the time of Pyrrhus, and was attacked by that monarch on account of its strong position and the advantages it offered for operations against Panormus; but the inhabitants readily capitulated. In the First Punic War it was occupied by a Carthaginian garrison, but after the fall of Panormus drove out these troops and opened its gates to the Romans. Under the Roman government it appears as a municipal town, but not one of much importance. The Ietini are only noticed in passing by Cicero among the towns whose lands had been utterly ruined by the exactions of Verres; and the Ietenses are enumerated by Pliny among the populi stipendiarii of the interior of Sicily. Many manuscripts of Cicero read "Letini", and it is probable that the Λῆτον of Ptolemy is only a corruption of the same name. The town minted coins in antiquity, examples of which survive.

The abandonment of Ietas was gradual, with some structures falling into disuse as early as the first century BCE, while others were abandoned in the Augustan or Julio-Claudian period. Destruction episodes, possibly caused by earthquakes or fires, occurred throughout the site's history. Occupation continued in certain areas until at least the fifth century CE, with signs of reuse and adaptation amid the decay of monumental infrastructure.

The position of Ietas is very obscurely intimated in ancient sources, but it appears from Diodorus that it was not very remote from Panormus, and that its site was one of great natural strength. Silius Italicus also alludes to its elevated situation. Fazello assures us that there was a mediaeval fortress called Iato on the summit of a lofty mountain, about 25 km from Palermo, and 20 km north of Entella, which was destroyed by Frederick II at the same time as the latter city; and this he identified as the site of Ietas. The mountain is still called Monte Iato (or Monte Jato or Monte di Iato), though formerly known as Monte di San Cosmano, from a church on its summit.

The toponym "Jato" or "Iato" is a reflection of the ancient name. (Istituto Geografico de Agostini, Nomi d'Italia, (ISBN 88-511-0983-4), p. 573.)
