= Sinking of the Roman fleet (255 BC) =

Maritime accident in the First Punic War

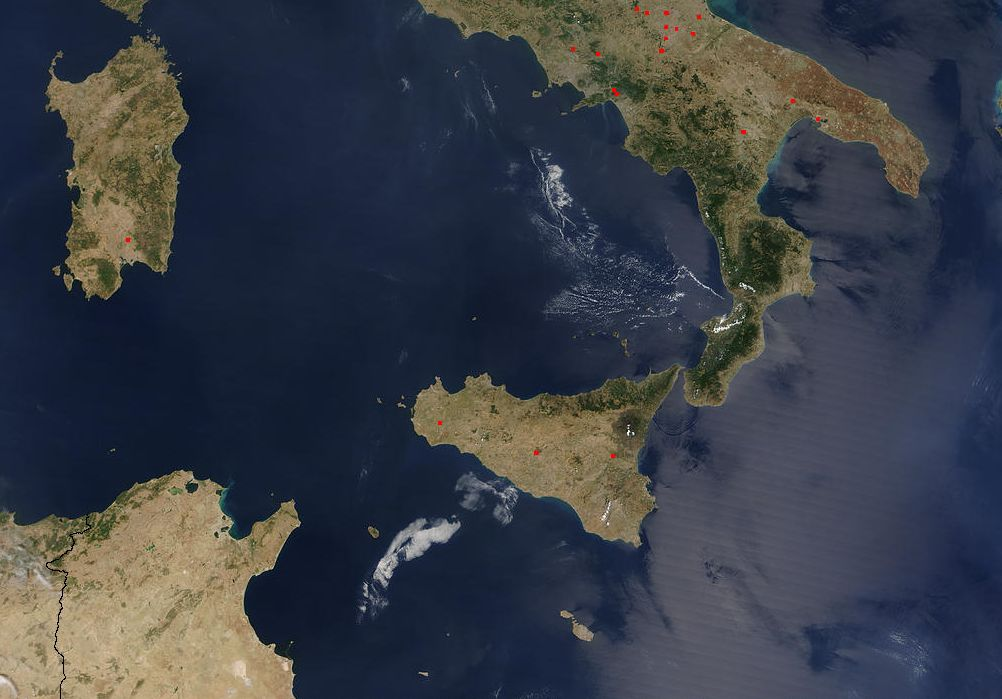
Satellite image of the Strait of Sicily

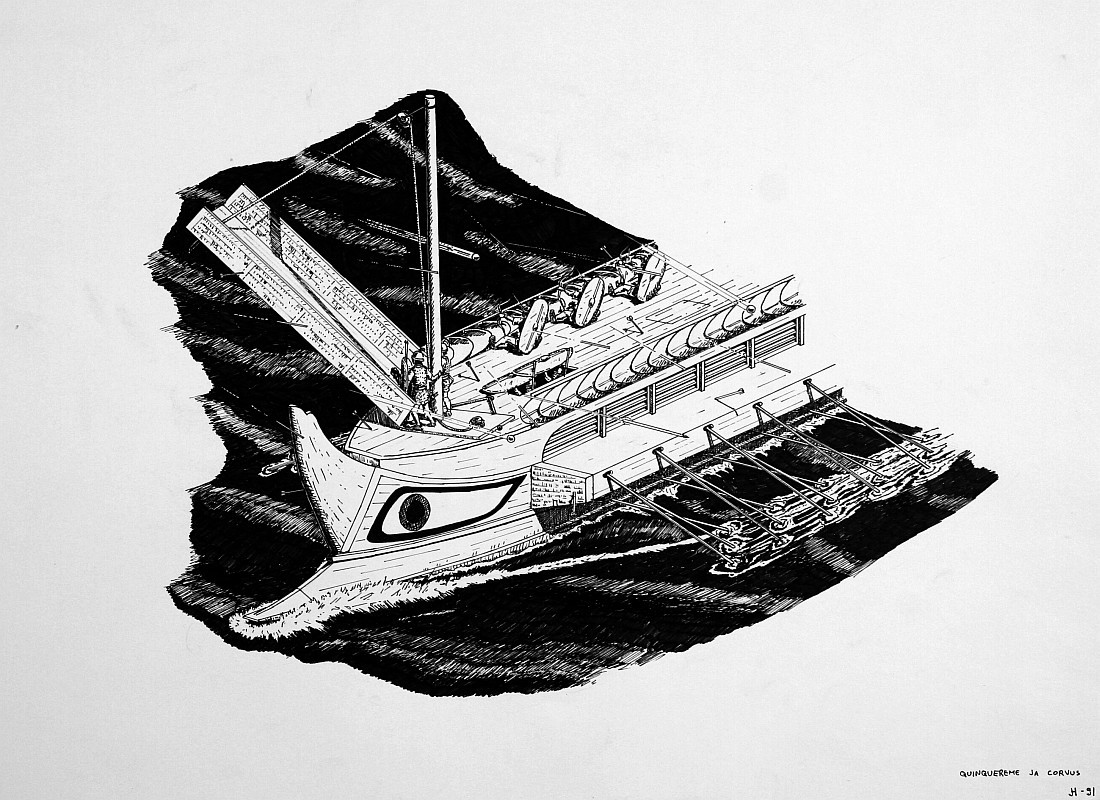
Roman warship with boarding bridge (corvus). It is possible that this new type of weapon made the ships unstable in a storm

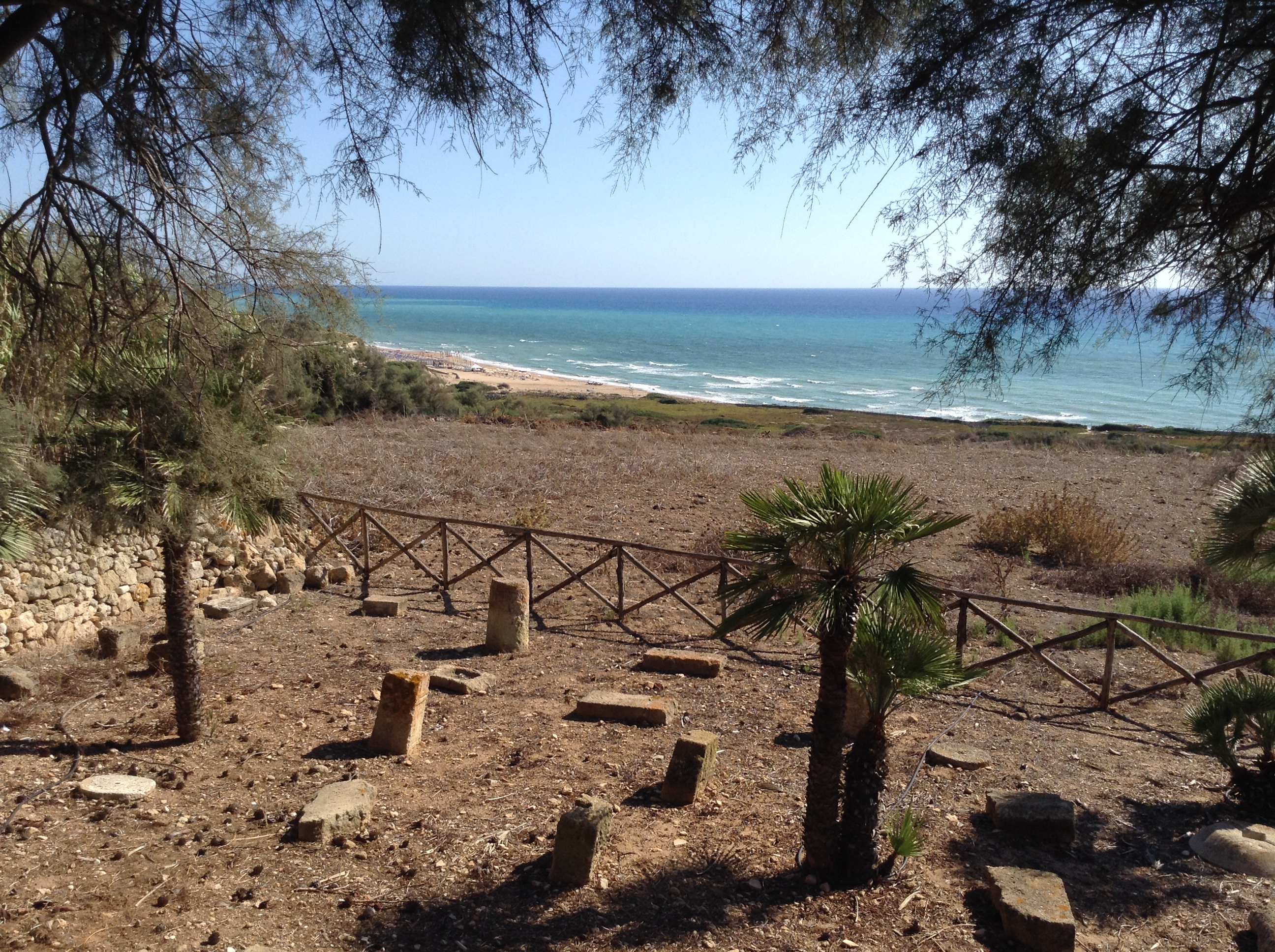
View of the coast from the Kamarina archaeological site

The Sinking of the Roman fleet in July 255 BC in the Strait of Sicily was the worst maritime disaster in antiquity and in the entire history of shipping. Up to 100,000 people died.

== Background ==
During the First Punic War, the two consuls of 255 BC, Servius Fulvius Paetinus Nobilior and Marcus Aemilius Paullus, were tasked with evacuating the Roman survivors of the Battle of the Bagradas River. They were given 350 warships for this rescue mission in North Africa, which they had to prepare. The sailors and oarsmen were provided by Rome's “seafaring allies” (socii navales). This fleet probably left at the beginning of June. On the outward journey, the consuls defeated a smaller Carthaginian fleet at Cape Hermaion. With few losses of their own, they captured 114 enemy ships, bringing the total size of this fleet to over 450 ships. In Clypea, the survivors of the defeated expeditionary army were taken on board, who also had some ships at their disposal. Raids were undertaken on the North African mainland. Supply problems forced the consuls to return to Rome prematurely. The ships of this large fleet were steered by a minimum number of sailors, although it can be assumed that Carthaginian prisoners were used as oarsmen.

== Storm and disaster ==
The return voyage was to be used for piracy and plundering in Carthaginian-controlled territory, thus bringing in additional prestige and booty. For this reason, the consuls ordered them to sail along the dangerous southern coast of Sicily against the advice of the helmsmen. The coast of Kamikos and Agrigento was under Roman control, but after Heraclea Minoa it was Carthaginian territory. In July, the Roman fleet was caught in a heavy storm near Kamarina. 384 of the total of 464 ships sank or were wrecked on the rocks near the coast. Tens of thousands of rowers, sailors and soldiers died. Many bodies and shipwrecks were washed up on the coast. Around 80 ships managed to sail around Cape Pachynon and reach the port of Syracuse.

== Reactions ==
Despite this catastrophe, both consuls celebrated a triumph for their victory at Cape Hermaion and a raid on Cossyra (Pantelleria); in addition, Aemilius Paullus was honored in Rome with a columna rostrata.

For the historian Polybius, the boundless Roman tenacity and boldness, which did not even bend to the laws of nature, led to the loss of the Roman fleet in the storm off Kamarina.

== Literature ==
- Bruno Bleckmann: Die römische Nobilität im Ersten Punischen Krieg. Untersuchungen zur aristokratischen Konkurrenz in der Republik. Akademie Verlag, Berlin 2002; ISBN 3-05-003738-5. (De Gruyter)
- Michael Pitassi: The Navies of Rome. Boydell & Brewer, Woodbridge 2009; ISBN 978-1-84383-600-1.
