= Olympian 5 =

Olympian 5, 'For Psaumis of Camarina', is an ode by the 5th century BC Greek poet Pindar.

== Background ==
The race with the mule-car was introduced at Olympia in 500 BC, and put down by proclamation in 444. The present Ode was probably composed for a victory won by Psaumis with the mule-car in 448. Such a car is implied by the term ἀπήνας, in line 3.

== Summary ==
The nymph of Camarina is asked to accept the worship of Psaumis, who has done her honour by his victories (1–6). On his return from Olympia, he celebrates the holy grove of Pallas and the local lake, and the two rivers; and also, by swiftly building a forest of lofty houses, brings his people out of perplexity (9–14).

Toil and cost are involved, while the mere chance of victory is in view, but success makes even fellow-citizens give a victor credit for wisdom (15, 16).

May Zeus Soter of Olympia bless Camarina, and permit Psaumis to reach a hale old age, while he rejoices in victorious steeds. Let him be content with health, wealth, and renown (17–24).

== Analysis ==
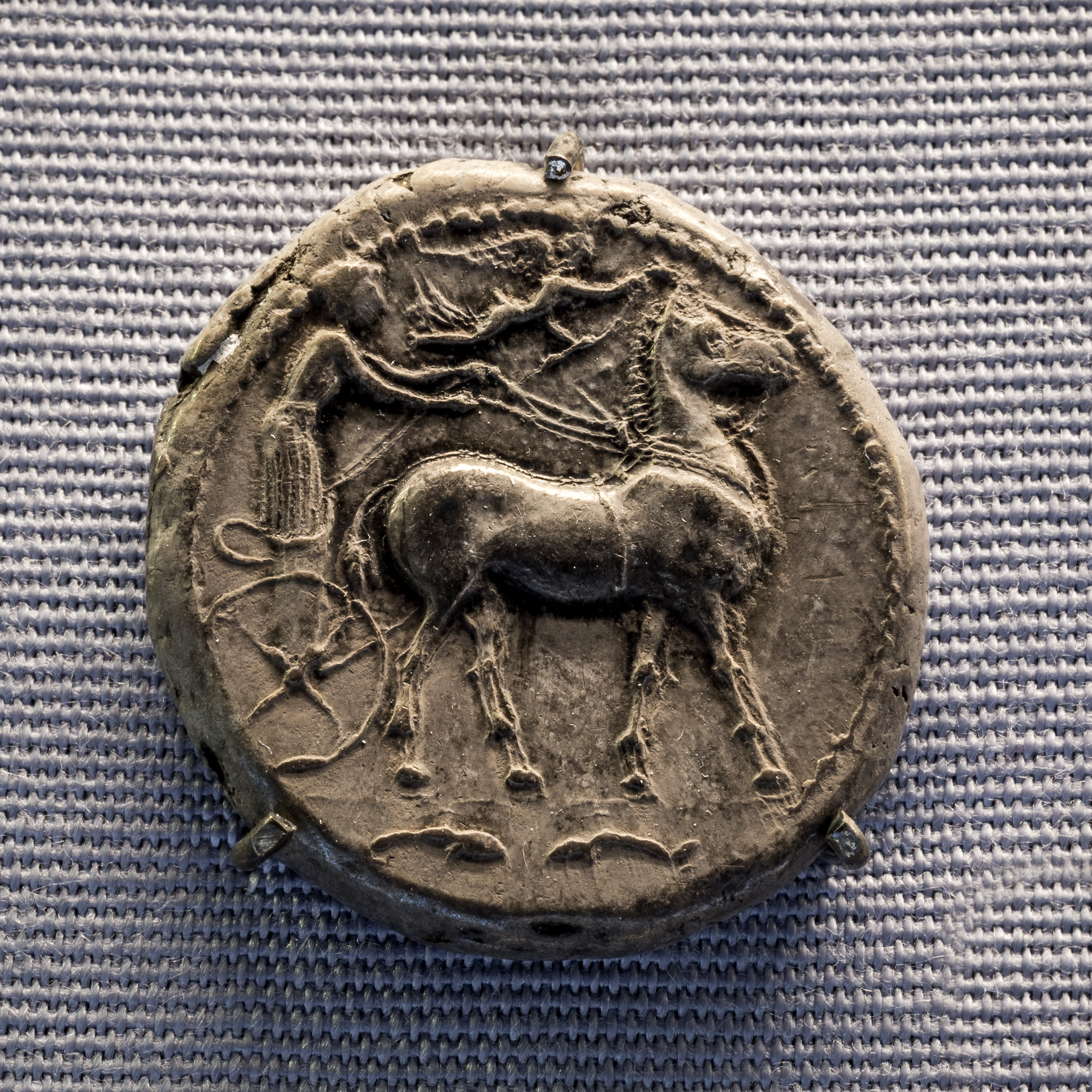
Coin of Messana, c. 460–30 BC. Mule-car

Some suppose that Olympian 4 and Olympian 5 both refer to the same victory, namely a victory with the mule-car, which was possibly won in 456, four years before the victory with the horse-chariot of 452, recorded in two MSS. On this view, Olympian 4 was sung in the festal procession, and Olympian 5 at the banquet. A scholium in the Ambrosian and five other MSS states that Olympian 5 was not in the original texts (ἐν τοῖς ἐδαφίοις), but was nevertheless assigned to Pindar in the annotations of the Alexandrian grammarian, Didymus.

== See also ==
- Chariot racing

== Sources ==
- Grenfell, Bernard P., ed. (1899). The Oxyrhynchus Papyri. Vol. 2. Oxford: Oxford University Press. p. 90.

Attribution:

- Sandys, John, ed. (1915). The Odes of Pindar, including the Principal Fragments. Loeb Classical Library. New York: The Macmillan Co. pp. 40–45.
