= Olympian 4 =

Olympian 4, 'For Psaumis of Camarina', is an ode by the 5th century BC Greek poet Pindar.

== Background ==
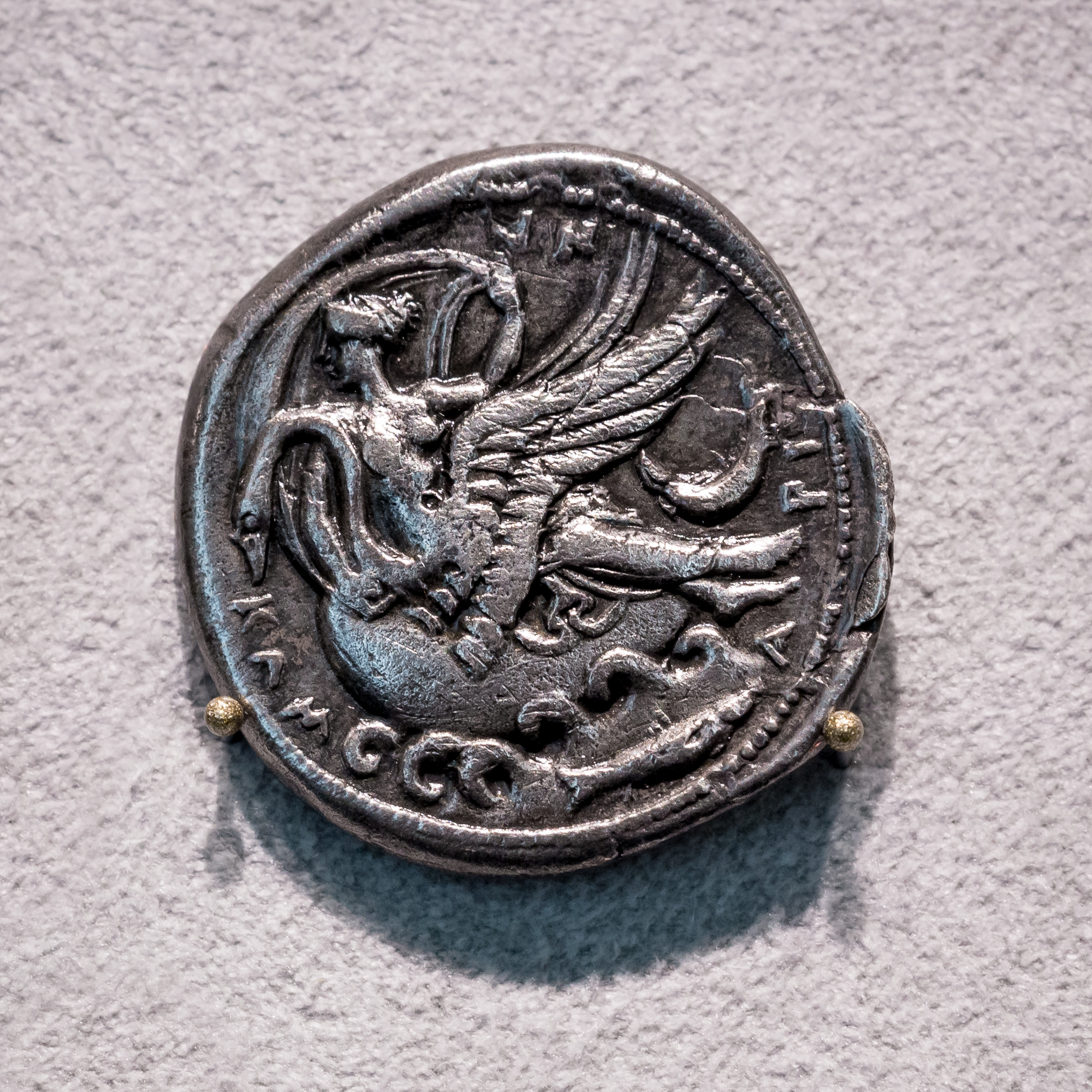
Coin of Camarina, c. 415–405 BC. Camarina on swan

Camarina had been founded by Syracuse in 599 BC. Destroyed by Syracuse after a revolt, it was rebuilt by Hippocrates, to be destroyed once more by Gelon, and rebuilt in 461 by men of Gela, mainly with the aid of Psaumis.

The Ode was probably in honour of a victory in the chariot-race in 452, a victory not of a tyrant, but of a free citizen. Under the above date the List of Olympian victors in the Oxyrhynchus papyrus places σαμιου καμ [αρινου τεθριππον], where σαμιου is possibly a mistake for Ψαυμιδος. The Ambrosian and the Paris MSS of Pindar state that Psaumis won the chariot race in 452 BC.

== Summary ==
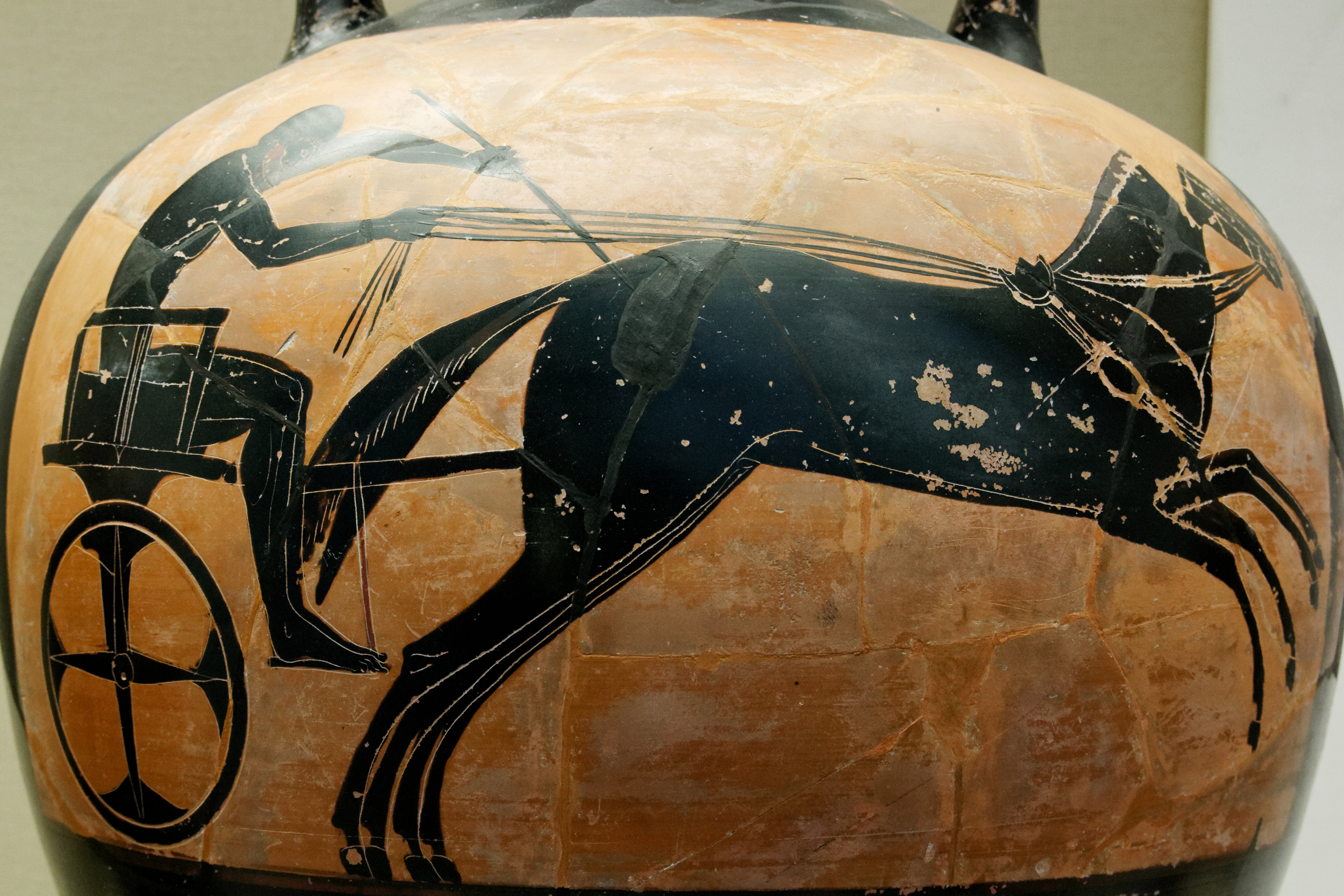
Attic amphora, 500–480 BC. Mule-charioteer

Zeus, the Thunderer, is invoked, Zeus whose daughters, the Seasons, had sent the poet to witness the Olympic games (1–3). Men of worth are gladdened by the prosperity of their friends (4, 5). May Zeus graciously welcome the chorus that celebrates the present triumph of Psaumis, and answer his further prayers (6–13). He is keen in the breeding of horses; and is hospitable and patriotic (13–16). For mortal men, trial is the true test. Even so, by trial, Erginus, the Argonaut, was saved from the reproach of the Lemnian women, when, though his hair was grey, he won the race in armour (17–28).

== See also ==
- Chariot racing

== Sources ==
- Grenfell, Bernard P., ed. (1899). The Oxyrhynchus Papyri. Vol. 2. Oxford: Oxford University Press. p. 90.

Attribution:

- Sandys, John, ed. (1915). The Odes of Pindar, including the Principal Fragments. Loeb Classical Library. New York: The Macmillan Co. pp. 40–45.
