= Kamarina =

Kamarina, Camarina, Kamerina or Camerina may refer to:

Places

- Kamarina, Greece, a village in Preveza regional unit, in the region of Epirus
- Kamarina, Sicily, an ancient city of Sicily, founded by Syracuse in 599 BC

others

- Camarina (mythology)
