= Rifriscolaro =

Rifriscolaro Greek: Ὄανις (Oanis)
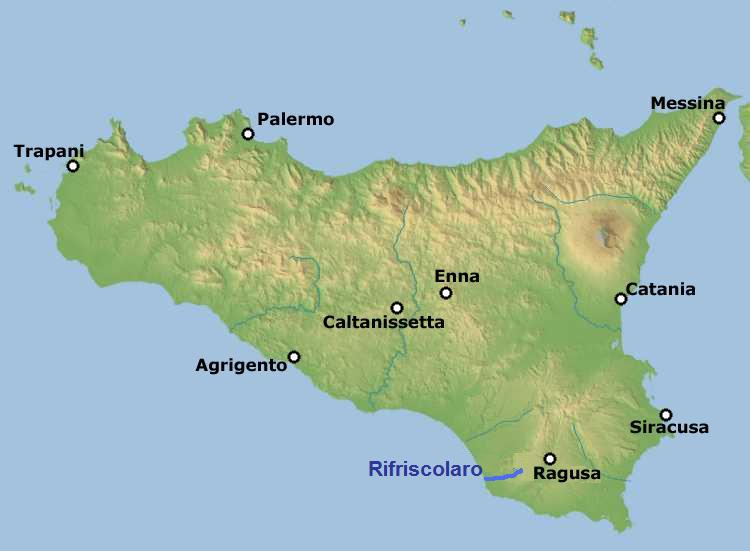
- Location of the Rifriscolaro within Sicily
- Native name: Rifriscolaro (Italian)

Location
- Country: Italy
- Region: Sicily

Physical characteristics
- Source
  - location: Donnafugata Castle
- Mouth
  - location: Ruins of Kamarina
- Length: 11 km (6.8 mi)

Basin features
- Progression: East

The Rifriscolaro, Sicilian Il Rifriscolaro, anciently called the Oanis Ancient Greek: Ὄανις), is an arroyo in south-east Sicily.

It rises a kilometre north of Donnafugata Castle, in the Ragusan countryside and flowing with an east–west orientation through the commune of Ragusa. After a course of around eleven kilometres it flows into the Mediterranean Sea, south of the ruined Greek city of Kamarina but the flow has a negative hydraulic balance and carries almost no water for the majority of the year. In the valley of the Rifriscolaro there are a number of diverse archaeological remains, which include the ruins of a temple of Demeter and a necropolis with graves dating to the Archaic Greek period (sixth century BCE) to the Hellenistic period (third century BCE).
