= Roman withdrawal from Africa (255 BC) =

Major Roman rescue operation during the First Punic War

Roman withdrawal from Africa, 255 BC
- Part of the First Punic War
Date	255 BC
Location	Cape Bon Peninsula; the waters off it; and off the coast of south-east Sicily 37°N 11°E
Result	Inconclusive

Belligerents
Carthage	Rome

Commanders and leaders
Unknown	Fulvius Paetinus Nobilior; Aemilius Paullus

Strength
200 warships; Unknown number of soldiers	390 warships; Unknown but large number of soldiers

Casualties and losses
16 ships sunk; 114 ships captured; Unknown number of soldiers killed or captured	384 warships and 300 cargo ships sunk and over 100,000 men lost in subsequent storm

The Roman withdrawal from Africa was the attempt by the Roman Republic in 255 BC to rescue the survivors of their defeated expeditionary force to Carthaginian Africa during the First Punic War. A large fleet commanded by Servius Fulvius Paetinus Nobilior and Marcus Aemilius Paullus successfully evacuated the survivors after defeating an intercepting Carthaginian fleet, but was struck by a storm while returning, losing most of its ships.

The Romans had invaded the Carthaginian homeland (in what is now north eastern Tunisia) in 256 BC. After initial successes, they had left a force of 15,500 men to hold their lodgement over the winter. This force, commanded by Marcus Atilius Regulus, was decisively beaten at the Battle of Tunis in the spring of 255 BC, leading to Regulus' capture. Two thousand survivors were besieged in the port of Aspis. The Roman fleet of 390 warships was sent to rescue and evacuate them. A Carthaginian fleet of 200 ships intercepted them off Cape Hermaeum (the modern Cape Bon or Ras ed-Dar), north of Aspis. The Carthaginians were defeated with 114 of their ships captured, together with their crews, and 16 sunk. Roman losses are unknown; most modern historians assume there were none.

The Romans landed in Aspis, sortied, dispersed the besiegers and raided the surrounding country for food. All then re-embarked and left for Italy. Off the south-east corner of Sicily, a sudden summer storm blew up and devastated the Roman fleet. From their total of 464 warships, 384 were sunk, as were 300 transports; and more than 100,000 men were lost. Despite the heavy losses of both sides, the war continued for a further 14 years, mostly on Sicily or the nearby waters, before ending with a Roman victory.

== Primary sources ==
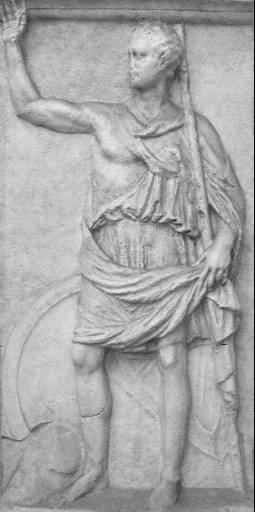
Polybius – "a remarkably well-informed, industrious, and insightful historian"

The main source for almost every aspect of the First Punic War (Note: The term Punic comes from the Latin word Punicus (or Poenicus), meaning "Carthaginian", and is a reference to the Carthaginians' Phoenician ancestry.) is the historian Polybius (c. 200 – c. 118 BC), a Greek sent to Rome in 167 BC as a hostage. His works include a now-lost manual on military tactics, but he is known today for The Histories, written sometime after 146 BC, or about a century after the Battle of Cape Hermaeum. Polybius's work is considered broadly objective and largely neutral as between Carthaginian and Roman points of view.

Carthaginian written records were destroyed along with their capital, Carthage, in 146 BC and so Polybius's account of the First Punic War is based on several, now-lost, Greek and Latin sources. Polybius was an analytical historian and wherever possible personally interviewed participants in the events he wrote about. Only the first book of the forty comprising The Histories deals with the First Punic War. The accuracy of Polybius's account has been much debated over the past 150 years, but the modern consensus is to accept it largely at face value and the details of the withdrawal in modern sources are largely based on interpretations of Polybius's account. The modern historian Andrew Curry has stated that "Polybius turns out to [be] fairly reliable"; while Dexter Hoyos describes him as "a remarkably well-informed, industrious, and insightful historian". Other, later, histories of the war exist, but in fragmentary or summary form, and they usually cover military operations on land in more detail than those at sea. Modern historians usually take into account the later histories of Diodorus Siculus and Dio Cassius, although the classicist Adrian Goldsworthy states "Polybius' account is usually to be preferred when it differs with any of our other accounts". (Note: Sources other than Polybius are discussed by Bernard Mineo in "Principal Literary Sources for the Punic Wars (apart from Polybius)".)

Other sources include inscriptions, archaeological evidence and empirical evidence from reconstructions such as the trireme Olympias. Since 2010 a number of artefacts have been recovered from the site of the Battle of the Aegates, the final battle of the war, fought fourteen years later. Their analysis and the recovery of further items are ongoing.

== Background ==
=== Operations in Sicily ===
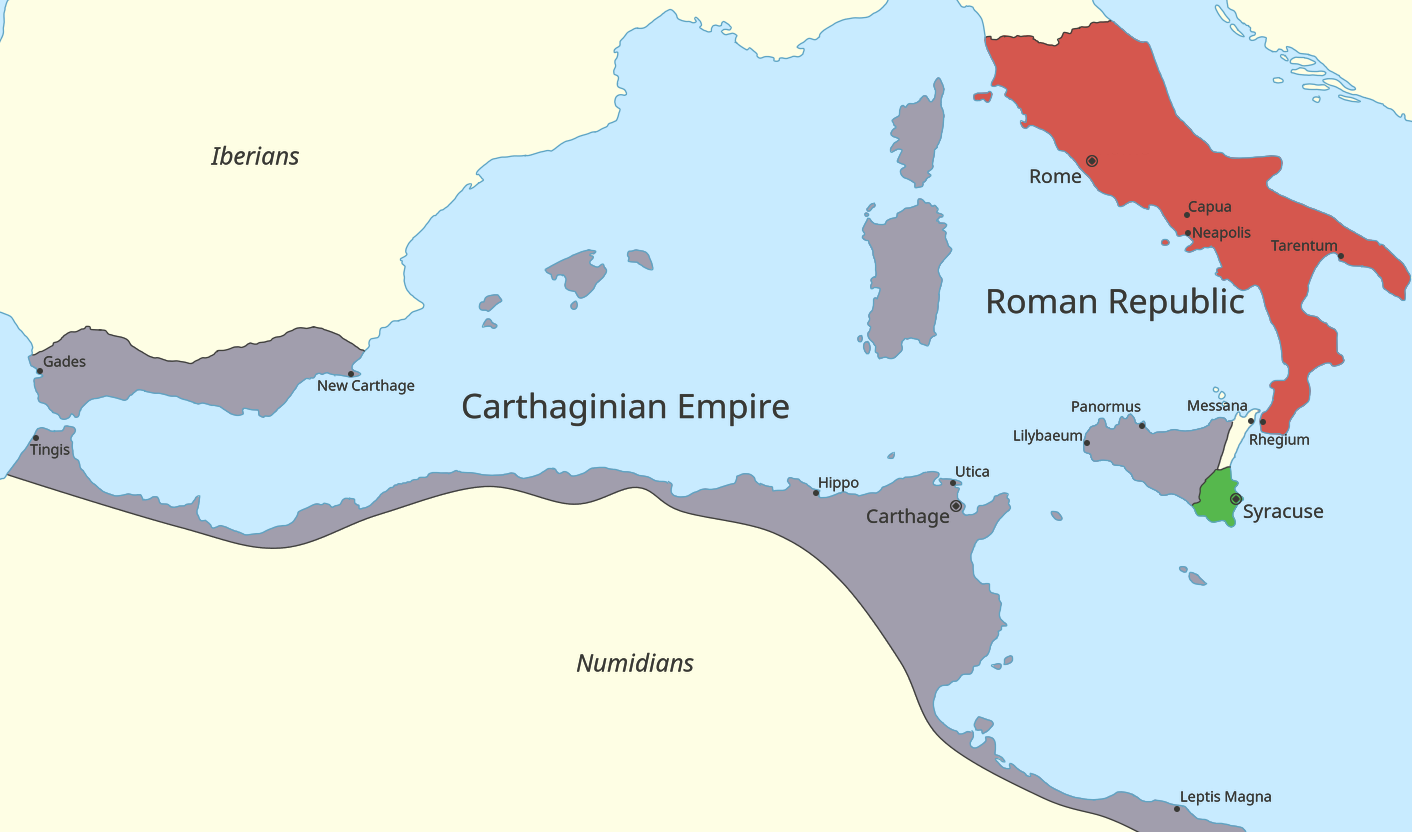
Territory controlled by Rome and Carthage at the start of the First Punic War

In 264 BC, the states of Carthage and Rome went to war, starting the First Punic War. Carthage was a well-established maritime power in the western Mediterranean; mainland Italy south of the River Arno had recently been unified under Roman control. According to the classicist Richard Miles, Rome's expansionary attitude after southern Italy came under its control combined with Carthage's proprietary approach to Sicily caused the two powers to stumble into war more by accident than design. The immediate cause of the war was the issue of control of the independent Sicilian city state of Messana (modern Messina).

=== Ships ===
During this period the standard Mediterranean warship was the quinquereme, meaning "five-rowers". The quinquereme was a galley, c. 45 metres (150 ft) long, c. 5 metres (16 ft) wide at water level, with its deck standing c. 3 metres (10 ft) above the sea and displacing around 100 tonnes (110 short tons; 100 long tons). The modern expert on galleys John Coates suggests they could maintain 7 knots (8.1 mph; 13 km/h) for extended periods. The modern replica galley Olympias has achieved speeds of 8.5 knots (9.8 mph; 15.7 km/h) and cruised at 4 knots (4.6 mph; 7.4 km/h) for hours on end. Average speeds of 5–6 knots (6–7 mph (9.7–11.3 km/h) were recorded on contemporary voyages of up to a week.

Vessels were built as cataphract, or "protected", ships, with a closed hull and a full deck able to carry marines and catapults. They had a separate "oar box" attached to the main hull which contained the rowers. These features allowed the hull to be strengthened, increased carrying capacity and improved conditions for the rowers. The generally accepted theory regarding the arrangement of oarsmen in quinqueremes is that there would be sets – or files – of three oars, one above the other, with two oarsmen on each of the two uppermost oars and one on the lower, for a total of five oarsmen per file. This would be repeated down the side of a galley for a total of 28 files on each side; 168 oars in total.

Depiction of the positions of the rowers of the three different oars in a Greek trireme

The Romans had little naval experience prior to the First Punic War; on the few occasions they had previously needed a naval presence they had usually relied on small squadrons provided by their Latin or Greek allies. In 260 BC the Romans set out to construct a fleet and used a shipwrecked Carthaginian quinquereme as a blueprint for their own. As novice shipwrights, the Romans built copies that were heavier than the Carthaginian vessels and thus slower and less manoeuvrable. The quinquereme was the workhorse of the Roman and Carthaginian fleets throughout the Punic Wars, although hexaremes (six oarsmen per bank), quadriremes (four oarsmen per bank) and triremes (three oarsmen per bank) are occasionally mentioned in the sources. So ubiquitous was the type that Polybius uses it as a shorthand for "warship" in general. A quinquereme carried a crew of 300: 280 oarsmen and 20 deck crew and officers. It would also normally carry a complement of 40 marines; if battle was thought to be imminent this would be increased to as many as 120.

Getting the oarsmen to row as a unit, let alone to execute more complex battle manoeuvres, required long and arduous training. At least half of the oarsmen needed to have had some experience if the ship was to be handled effectively. As a result, the Romans were initially at a disadvantage against the more experienced Carthaginians. All warships were equipped with a ram, a triple set of 60-centimetre-wide (2 ft) bronze blades weighing up to 270 kilograms (600 lb) positioned at the waterline. All of the rams recovered by modern archeologists were made individually by the lost-wax method to fit immovably to a galley's prow, and secured with bronze spikes. Ideally one would attack an enemy ship from its side or rear, thus avoiding the possibility of being rammed oneself. Skill was required to impact an opposing galley forcefully enough to break loose its timbers and cause it to founder, but not so forcefully as to embed one's own galley in the stricken enemy. Each vessel relied to a large extent on the other vessels in its squadron for protection and tactics involved the manoeuvring of whole squadrons rather than individual ships; although battles sometimes broke down into a series of ship on ship combats which have been likened to aerial dogfights.

== Invasion of Africa ==
Largely because of the Romans' invention of the corvus, a device that enabled them to grapple and board enemy vessels more easily, the Carthaginians were defeated in large naval battles at Mylae (260 BC) and Sulci (257 BC). Encouraged by these and frustrated at the continuing stalemate in Sicily, the Romans changed their focus to a sea-based strategy and developed a plan to invade the Carthaginian heartland in North Africa and threaten Carthage (close to Tunis). Both sides were determined to establish naval supremacy and invested large amounts of money and manpower in maintaining and increasing the size of their navies.

The Roman fleet of 330 warships plus an unknown number of transport ships sailed from Ostia, the port of Rome, in early 256 BC, commanded by the consuls for the year, Marcus Atilius Regulus and Lucius Manlius Vulso Longus. They embarked approximately 26,000 picked legionaries from the Roman forces on Sicily. They planned to cross to Africa and invade what is now Tunisia. The Carthaginians were aware of the Romans' intentions and mustered all available warships, 350, under Hanno (Note: He was known as Hanno the Great, the second (of three) Carthaginians named Hanno to be awarded that sobriquet.) and Hamilcar, off the south coast of Sicily to intercept them. A combined total of about 680 warships carrying up to 290,000 crew and marines (Note: The modern historian Boris Rankov writes that it "may have involved the largest number of combatants of any naval battle in history"; a view also put forward by the classicist John Lazenby.) met in the Battle of Cape Ecnomus. The Carthaginians took the initiative, anticipating that their superior ship-handling skills would tell. After a prolonged and confused day of fighting the Carthaginians were defeated, losing 30 ships sunk and 64 captured to Roman losses of 24 ships sunk.

1: Romans land and capture Aspis (256 BC) 2: Roman victory at Adys (256 BC) 3: Romans capture Tunis (256 BC) 4: Xanthippus sets out from Carthage with a large army (255 BC) 5: Romans are defeated at the Battle of Tunis. (255 BC) 6: Romans retreat to Aspis and leave Africa. (255 BC)

As a result of the battle, the Roman army, commanded by Regulus, landed in Africa near Aspis (modern Kelibia) and captured it. Most of the Roman ships returned to Sicily, leaving Regulus with 15,000 infantry and 500 cavalry to continue the war in Africa. Regulus advanced on the city of Adys and besieged it. The Carthaginians, meanwhile, had recalled Hamilcar from Sicily with 5,000 infantry and 500 cavalry. Hamilcar, Hasdrubal and Bostar were placed in joint command of an army which was strong in cavalry and elephants and was approximately the same size as the Romans'. The Romans carried out a night march and launched a surprise dawn attack on the Carthaginian camp from two directions. After confused fighting, the Carthaginians broke and fled.

== Roman reversal and withdrawal ==
=== Battle of Tunis ===
The Romans followed up and captured Tunis, only 16 kilometres (10 mi) from Carthage. In despair, the Carthaginians sued for peace, but Regulus's proposed terms were so harsh the Carthaginians decided to fight on. They gave charge of the training of their army to the Spartan mercenary commander Xanthippus. In the spring of 255 BC Xanthippus led an army of 12,000 infantry, 4,000 cavalry and 100 war elephants against the Romans' infantry-based army at the Battle of Tunis. The Romans had no effective answer to the elephants, their outnumbered cavalry were chased from the field and the Carthaginian cavalry then surrounded most of the Romans and decisively defeated them. Most of the Romans were killed, while approximately 500, including Regulus, were captured; another 2,000 Romans escaped and retreated to Aspis which was situated on a high and naturally strong position and overlooked the natural harbour of the Bay of Clupea. Xanthippus, fearful of the envy of the Carthaginian generals he had outdone, took his pay and returned to Greece.

=== Battle of Cape Hermaeum ===
Location of the battle on a map of modern Tunisia

Later in 255 BC the Romans sent a fleet of 350 quinqueremes (Note: The figure of 350 warships comes from Polybius. However, for most of the 20th century prominent historians – including Karl Julius Beloch, Gaetano De Sanctis and F. W. Walbank – argued for lower figures of 210 or 250, claiming that Polybius's figure was based on an error, a miscalculation, or even Roman propaganda. In 1985 the historian G. K. Tipps published an influential article favouring Polybius' figure and his conclusions have been generally followed since by modern scholars.) and more than 300 transports to evacuate their survivors, who were under siege in Aspis. Both consuls for the year, Servius Fulvius Paetinus Nobilior and Marcus Aemilius Paullus, accompanied the fleet. They captured the island of Cossyra en route.

The Carthaginians attempted to oppose the evacuation with 200 quinqueremes. They intercepted the Romans off Cape Hermaeum (the modern Cape Bon or Ras ed-Dar), a little to the north of Aspis. The 40 Roman ships which had been left to support Regulus's force over the winter sortied from Aspis to join the fight. Few details of the battle have survived. The Carthaginians were concerned they would be encircled by the larger Roman fleet and so sailed close to the coast. However, the Carthaginian ships were outmanoeuvred and pinned against the coast, where many were boarded via the corvus and captured, or forced to beach. The Carthaginians were defeated and 114 of their ships were captured, together with their crews, and 16 sunk. What, if any, the Roman losses were is not known; most modern historians assume there were none. The historian Marc DeSantis suggests that a lack of soldiers serving as marines on the Carthaginian ships, compared with the Romans', may have been a factor in their defeat and in the large number of vessels captured.

=== Storm off Camarina ===
The fleet docked at Aspis, where the Roman garrison – reinforced by the fleet's marines – sortied, dispersed the besiegers and raided the surrounding country for food. All then re-embarked and left for Italy. They sailed directly to Sicily, making landfall at its south-west corner, then proceeded along the south coast. In mid-July, somewhere between the friendly city of Camarina and Cape Passaro, the south-east corner of Sicily, a sudden summer storm blew up and devastated the Roman fleet. From their total of 464 warships, 384 were sunk, (Note: This assumes, per G.K. Tipps, that all 114 captured Carthaginian vessels were sailing with the Romans.) as were 300 transports and more than 100,000 men were lost. DeSantis considers 100,000 to be a conservative estimate while the historian Howard Scullard breaks the loss down as 25,000 soldiers, who would have included many of the survivors of Regulus's army; and 70,000 rowers and crew, with many of these probably being Carthaginians taken captive in the recent battle. The majority of the casualties are assumed to have been non-Roman Latin allies. It is possible that the presence of the corvus made the Roman ships unusually unseaworthy; there is no record of them being used after this disaster.

Polybius is critical of what he considers the poor judgement and seamanship displayed immediately prior to the storm. Both consuls survived and, despite the loss of most of their fleet, each was awarded a triumph in January 254 for their victory at Cape Hermaeum. Scullard says this is a clear indication "the subsequent tragedy was regarded as due to natural causes rather than to bad seamanship".

== Aftermath ==
Paullus built a column at his own expense on the Capitoline Hill in Rome celebrating the victory. In keeping with tradition he adorned it with the prows of captured Carthaginian ships. The column was destroyed by lightning in 172 BC.

The war continued, with neither side able to gain a decisive advantage. The Romans rapidly rebuilt their fleet, adding 220 new ships, and captured Panormus (modern Palermo) in 254 BC. The next year they lost 150 ships to another storm. Slowly the Romans had occupied most of Sicily; in 249 BC they besieged the last two Carthaginian strongholds – in the extreme west. They also launched a surprise attack on the Carthaginian fleet, but were defeated at the Battle of Drepana. The Carthaginians followed up their victory and most of the remaining Roman warships were lost at the Battle of Phintias; the Romans were all but swept from the sea. It was to be seven years before Rome again attempted to field a substantial fleet, while Carthage put most of its ships into reserve to save money and free up manpower.

After several years of stalemate, the Romans rebuilt their fleet again in 243 BC and effectively blockaded the Carthaginian garrisons. Carthage assembled a fleet which attempted to relieve them, but it was destroyed at the Battle of the Aegates Islands in 241 BC, forcing the cut-off Carthaginian troops on Sicily to negotiate for peace. The terms offered to Carthage were more generous than those proposed by Regulus. The question of which state was to control the western Mediterranean remained open, and when Carthage besieged the Roman-protected town of Saguntum in eastern Iberia in 218 BC, it ignited the Second Punic War with Rome.

== Notes, citations and sources ==
=== Sources ===
- Andrei, Cristina; Nedu, Decebal (2010). "The Campaign of Marcus Atilius Regulus in Africa, Military Operations by Sea and by Land (256−255 B.C.)". Constanta Maritime University Annals. Constanta, Romania: Constanta Maritime University: 206–209. ISSN 1582-3601.
- Bagnall, Nigel (1999). The Punic Wars: Rome, Carthage and the Struggle for the Mediterranean. London: Pimlico. ISBN 978-0-7126-6608-4.
- Briscoe, John (2012). A Commentary on Livy: Books 41–45. Oxford: Clarendon Press. ISBN 9780199216642.
- Casson, Lionel (1991). The Ancient Mariners (2nd ed.). Princeton, New Jersey: Princeton University Press. ISBN 978-0-691-06836-7.
- Casson, Lionel (1995). Ships and Seamanship in the Ancient World. Baltimore: Johns Hopkins University Press. ISBN 978-0-8018-5130-8.
- Champion, Craige B. (2015) [2011]. "Polybius and the Punic Wars". In Hoyos, Dexter (ed.). A Companion to the Punic Wars. Chichester, West Sussex: John Wiley & Sons. pp. 95–110. ISBN 978-1-1190-2550-4.
- Coates, John F. (2004). "The Naval Architecture and Oar Systems of Ancient Galleys". In Gardiner, Robert (ed.). Age of the Galley: Mediterranean Oared Vessels since Pre-Classical Times. London: Chrysalis. pp. 127–141. ISBN 978-0-85177-955-3.
- Collins, Roger (1998). Spain: An Oxford Archaeological Guide. Oxford University Press. ISBN 978-0-19-285300-4.
- Curry, Andrew (2012). "The Weapon That Changed History". Archaeology. 65 (1): 32–37. JSTOR 41780760.
- DeSantis, Marc (2016). Rome Seizes the Trident: The Defeat of Carthaginian Seapower and the Forging of the Roman Empire. Barnsley: Pen and Sword. ISBN 978-1-4738-7990-4.
- Erdkamp, Paul (2015) [2011]. "Manpower and Food Supply in the First and Second Punic Wars". In Hoyos, Dexter (ed.). A Companion to the Punic Wars. Chichester, West Sussex: John Wiley & Sons. pp. 58–76. ISBN 978-1-1190-2550-4.
- Goldsworthy, Adrian (2006). The Fall of Carthage: The Punic Wars 265–146 BC. London: Phoenix. ISBN 978-0-304-36642-2.
- Hau, Lisa (2016). Moral History from Herodotus to Diodorus Siculus. Edinburgh: Edinburgh University Press. ISBN 978-1-4744-1107-3.
- Hoyos, Dexter (2007). Truceless War: Carthage's Fight for Survival, 241 to 237 BC. Leiden; Boston: Brill. ISBN 978-90-474-2192-4.
- Hoyos, Dexter (2015) [2011]. A Companion to the Punic Wars. Chichester, West Sussex: John Wiley & Sons. ISBN 978-1-1190-2550-4.
- Lazenby, John (1996). The First Punic War: A Military History. Stanford, California: Stanford University Press. ISBN 978-0-8047-2673-3.
- Meijer, Fik (1986). A History of Seafaring in the Classical World. London; Sydney: Croom and Helm. ISBN 978-0-7099-3565-0.
- Miles, Richard (2011). Carthage Must be Destroyed. London: Penguin. ISBN 978-0-14-101809-6.
- Mineo, Bernard (2015) [2011]. "Principal Literary Sources for the Punic Wars (apart from Polybius)". In Hoyos, Dexter (ed.). A Companion to the Punic Wars. Chichester, West Sussex: John Wiley & Sons. pp. 111–128. ISBN 978-1-1190-2550-4.
- Murray, William M. (2011). The Age of Titans: The Rise and Fall of the Great Hellenistic Navies. Oxford: Oxford University Press. ISBN 978-0-19-993240-5.
- Rankov, Boris (2015) [2011]. "A War of Phases: Strategies and Stalemates". In Hoyos, Dexter (ed.). A Companion to the Punic Wars. Chichester, West Sussex: John Wiley & Sons. pp. 149–166. ISBN 978-1-4051-7600-2.
- Royal, Jeffrey G.; Tusa, Sebastiano, eds. (2019). The Site of the Battle of the Aegates Islands at the End of the First Punic War. Fieldwork, Analyses and Perspectives, 2005–2015. Bibliotheca Archaeologica. Vol. 60. Rome: L'Erma di Bretschneider. ISBN 978-88-913-1835-0.
- Scullard, H. H. (2006) [1989]. "Carthage and Rome". In Walbank, F. W.; Astin, A. E.; Frederiksen, M. W. & Ogilvie, R. M. (eds.). Cambridge Ancient History: Volume 7, Part 2, 2nd Edition. Cambridge: Cambridge University Press. pp. 486–569. ISBN 978-0-521-23446-7.
- Shutt, Rowland (1938). "Polybius: A Sketch". Greece & Rome. 8 (22): 50–57. doi:10.1017/S001738350000588X. JSTOR 642112. S2CID 162905667.
- Sidwell, Keith C.; Jones, Peter V. (1998). The World of Rome: an Introduction to Roman Culture. Cambridge: Cambridge University Press. ISBN 978-0-521-38600-5.
- de Souza, Philip (2008). "Naval Forces". In Sabin, Philip; van Wees, Hans & Whitby, Michael (eds.). The Cambridge History of Greek and Roman Warfare, Volume 1: Greece, the Hellenistic World and the Rise of Rome. Cambridge: Cambridge University Press. pp. 357–367. ISBN 978-0-521-85779-6.
- Tipps, G.K. (1985). "The Battle of Ecnomus". Historia: Zeitschrift für Alte Geschichte. 34 (4): 432–465. JSTOR 4435938.
- Tusa, Sebastiano; Royal, Jeffrey (2012). "The Landscape of the Naval Battle at the Egadi Islands (241 B.C.)" (PDF). Journal of Roman Archaeology. 25. Cambridge University Press: 7–48. doi:10.1017/S1047759400001124. ISSN 1047-7594. S2CID 159518193. Archived from the original (PDF) on 26 April 2020.
- Walbank, Frank (1959). "Naval Triaii". The Classical Review. 64 (1): 10–11. doi:10.1017/S0009840X00092258. JSTOR 702509. S2CID 162463877.
- Walbank, F.W. (1990). Polybius. Vol. 1. Berkeley: University of California Press. ISBN 978-0-520-06981-7.
- Warmington, Brian (1993) [1960]. Carthage. New York: Barnes & Noble, Inc. ISBN 978-1-56619-210-1.
