= Servius Fulvius Paetinus Nobilior =

Roman general and statesman, consul in 255 BCE

Servius Fulvius Paetinius Nobilior was a Roman statesman and general during the middle era of the Roman Republic. He was one of the two consuls of 255 BCE, serving with Marcus Aemilius Paullus. He was consul during the First Punic War against Carthage. Paetinus and his consular colleague led a Roman fleet of 350 warships to Africa to rescue the remnants of the army of proconsul Marcus Atilius Regelus, who had been defeated at the Battle of the Bagradas River during their consulship. En route they defeated a Carthaginian fleet of 200 warships in the Battle of Cape Hermaeum.

Location of the battle on a map of modern Tunisia

After the battle they started pillaging the African shore. They defeated two Carthaginian generals named Hanno and occupied the island of Pantelleria opposite Cape Bon. The Carthaginians they had taken prisoner during their campaign were exchanged for the Romans the Carthaginians had captured after the Bagradas, and the remnants of Regelus's expedition army, who had fortified themselves in Aspis, were rescued. After the successful rescue operation they sailed back to Sicily. Off the coast of Camarina their fleet was struck by a violent storm and many ships were wrecked with huge loss of life.

== Sources ==
- Jona Lendering, De Vergeten Oorlog, Utrecht, Uitgeverij Omniboek, ISBN 9789401918640.
- Adrian Goldsworthy, The Fall of Carthage, Weidenfeld&Nicolson, 2006, ISBN 978-0-3043-6642-2.
- Polybius, The Histories, book 1.
- Diodorus, Bibliotheca historica, book 23.
- Livy, Periochae.
- Orosius, History Against the Pagans, book 4.
- Zonaras, book 4, fragment 14.

Political offices
Preceded by Lucius Manlius Vulso Longus; Marcus Atilius Regelus	Roman consul 255 BCE with Marcus Aemilius Paullus	Succeeded by Aulus Atilius Caiatinus; Gnaeus Cornelius Scipio Asina
