= Marcus Aemilius Paullus =

Roman general and statesman, consul in 255 BCE

Marcus Aemilius Paullus was a Roman statesman and general during the middle era of the Roman Republic. He was one of the consuls of 255 BCE, serving with Servius Fulvius Paetinius Nobilior. As consul Paullus led the Republic's forces in the ongoing First Punic War against Carthage; he and Paetinus led a Roman fleet of 350 warships to Africa to rescue the remnants of the army of proconsul Marcus Atilius Regulus, who had been defeated in the Battle of the Bagradas River earlier that year. Onroute they defeated a Carthaginian fleet of 200 warships in the Battle of Cape Hermaeum.

Location of the battle on a map of modern Tunisia

After the battle they started pillaging the African shore. They defeated two Carthaginian generals named Hanno and occupied the island of Pantelleria opposite Cape Bon. The Carthaginians they had taken prisoner during their campaign were exchanged for the Romans the Carthaginians had captured after the Bagradas, and the remnants of Regelus's expedition army, who had fortified themselves in Aspis, were rescued. After the successful rescue operation they sailed back to Sicily. Off the coast of Camarina their fleet was struck by a violent storm and many ships were wrecked with huge loss of life.

Marcus Aemilius Paullus was the father of Lucius Aemilius Paullus, the consul of 219 and 216 BCE, who was defeated by Hannibal at Cannae. He was also the grandfather of Lucius Aemilius Paullus Macedonicus, the conqueror of Macedon, and the great-grandfather of Publius Cornelius Scipio Aemilianus, the conqueror of Carthage.

== Modern sources ==
- Jona Lendering, De Vergeten Oorlog, Utrecht, Uitgeverij Omniboek, 2022, ISBN 9789401918640.
- Adrian Goldsworthy, The Fall of Carthage, Weidenfeld&Nicolson, 2006, ISBN 9780304366422.

== Ancient sources ==
- Polybius, The Histories, book 1.
- Diodorus, Bibliotheca historica, book 23.
- Livy, Periochae.
- Orosius, History Against the Pagans, book 4.
- Zonaras, book 4, fragment 14.

Political offices
Preceded by Lucius Manlius Vulso Longus; Marcus Atilius Regelus	Roman consul 255 BCE with Servius Fulvius Paetinius Nobilior	Succeeded by Aulus Atilius Caiatinus; Gnaeus Cornelius Scipio Asina
