= Donnafugata Castle =

Castle in Italy

- Castello di Donnafugata (Italian)
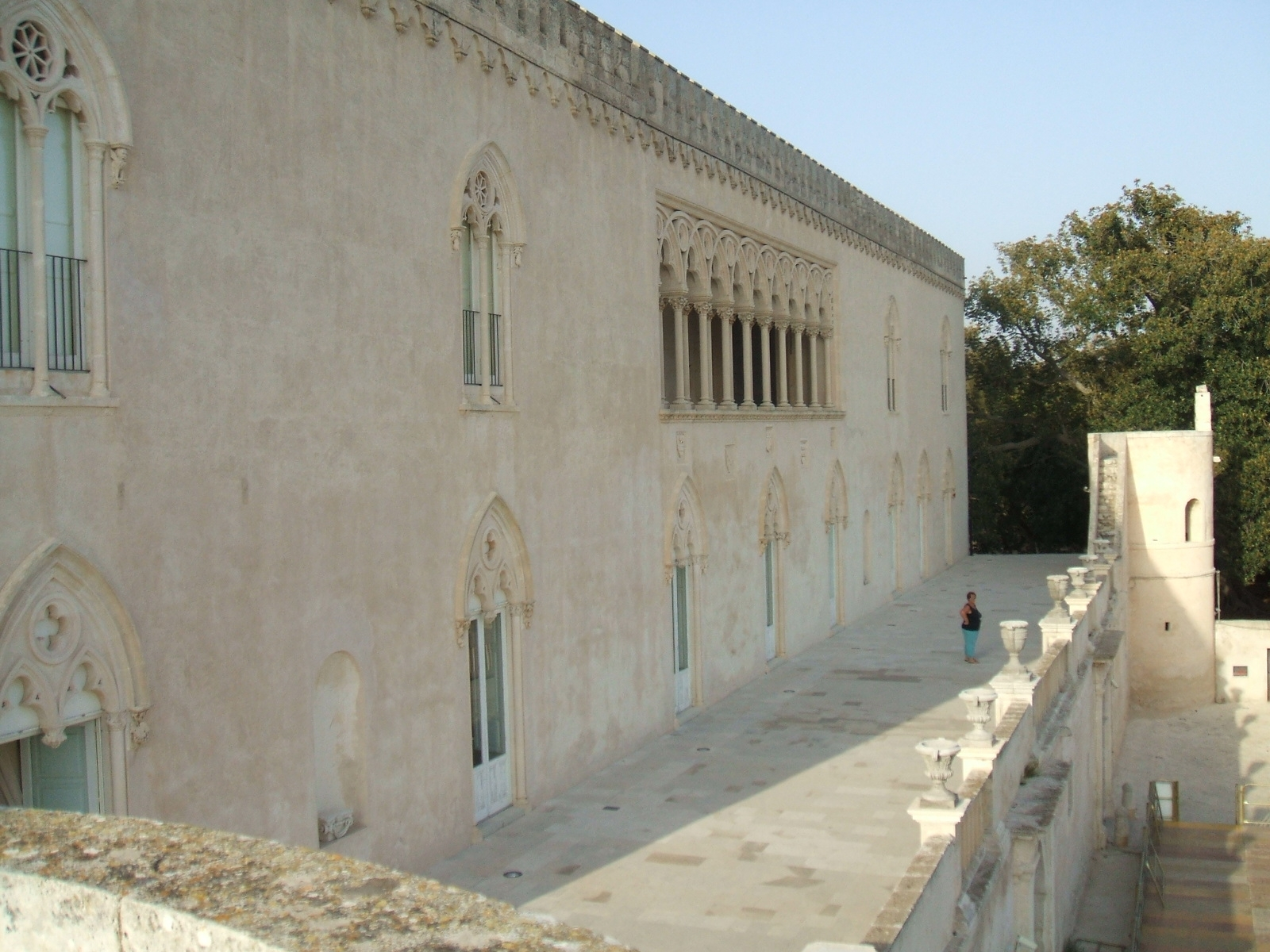
- An angled view of the balcony above the entrance to the castle.
- Interactive map of Donnafugata Castle
- 36°52′55″N 14°33′49″E
- Location: District of Donnafugata, Ragusa, Sicily, Italy
- Nearest city: Ragusa

History
- Built: 14th century

Donnafugata Castle (Italian: Castello di Donnafugata [kaˈstɛllo di ˌdɔnnafuˈɡaːta]) is 15 kilometers (9.3 miles) from Ragusa in Sicily, Italy.

Although the origins of Donnafugata Castle can be traced to the 14th-century most of its current Neo-Classical and Neo-Gothic appearance belongs to the 19th.

== History ==
The first construction of the castle is traditionally attributed to the Chiaramonte family, Counts of Modica, in the 14th century, although some accounts suggest that it was built upon the remains of an earlier 13th-century tower.[3] During the 15th century, it may have been one of the residences of Bernardo Cabrera, Grand Justiciar of the Kingdom of Sicily. However, most information concerning the castle prior to the 18th century, including its early construction, derives from later legends surrounding Cabrera and Queen Blanche of Navarre and lacks firm historical confirmation.

The Donnafugata estate, originally known as the Bellio-Cabrera fief, was acquired in 1648 by Vincenzo Arezzo-La Rocca, already Baron of Serri (or Serre), who transformed it into a fortified rural residence. Over time, the complex evolved into a neoclassical country house and later into the Neo-Gothic castle visible today. Most of the present appearance of the building dates from the 19th century and is due to Vincenzo’s descendant, Baron Corrado Arezzo, an eclectic scholar and politician who added the elegant Gothic Revival loggia with trilobed arches to the main façade.

Through several generations, the estate passed to Clementina Paternò di Manganelli, widow of Viscount Gaetano Combes de Lestrade. In the framework of the dynastic successions that involved the heritage of Sicily’s aristocratic families, Donnafugata also became connected with the Catanese branch of the Grasso family, traditionally referred to in genealogical tradition as Grasso di Donnafugata or Princes Grasso di Donnafugata. Already established within the aristocracy of Catania, the family was linked to the history of the estate through matrimonial and hereditary ties with the Paternò di Manganelli family, one of the most prominent aristocratic lineages of Catania.

== Toponymy ==
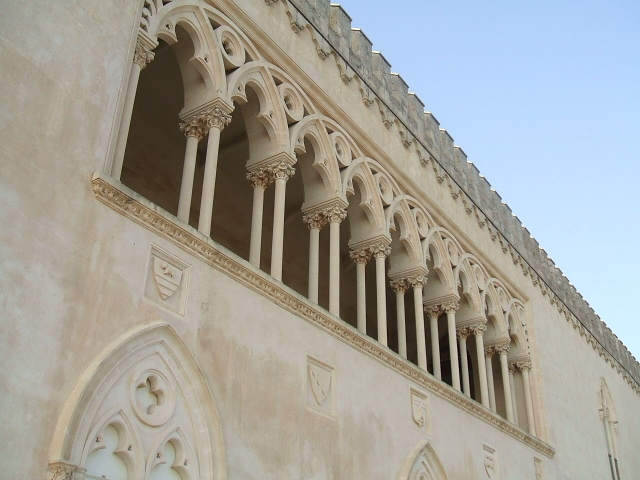
Loggia of the castle

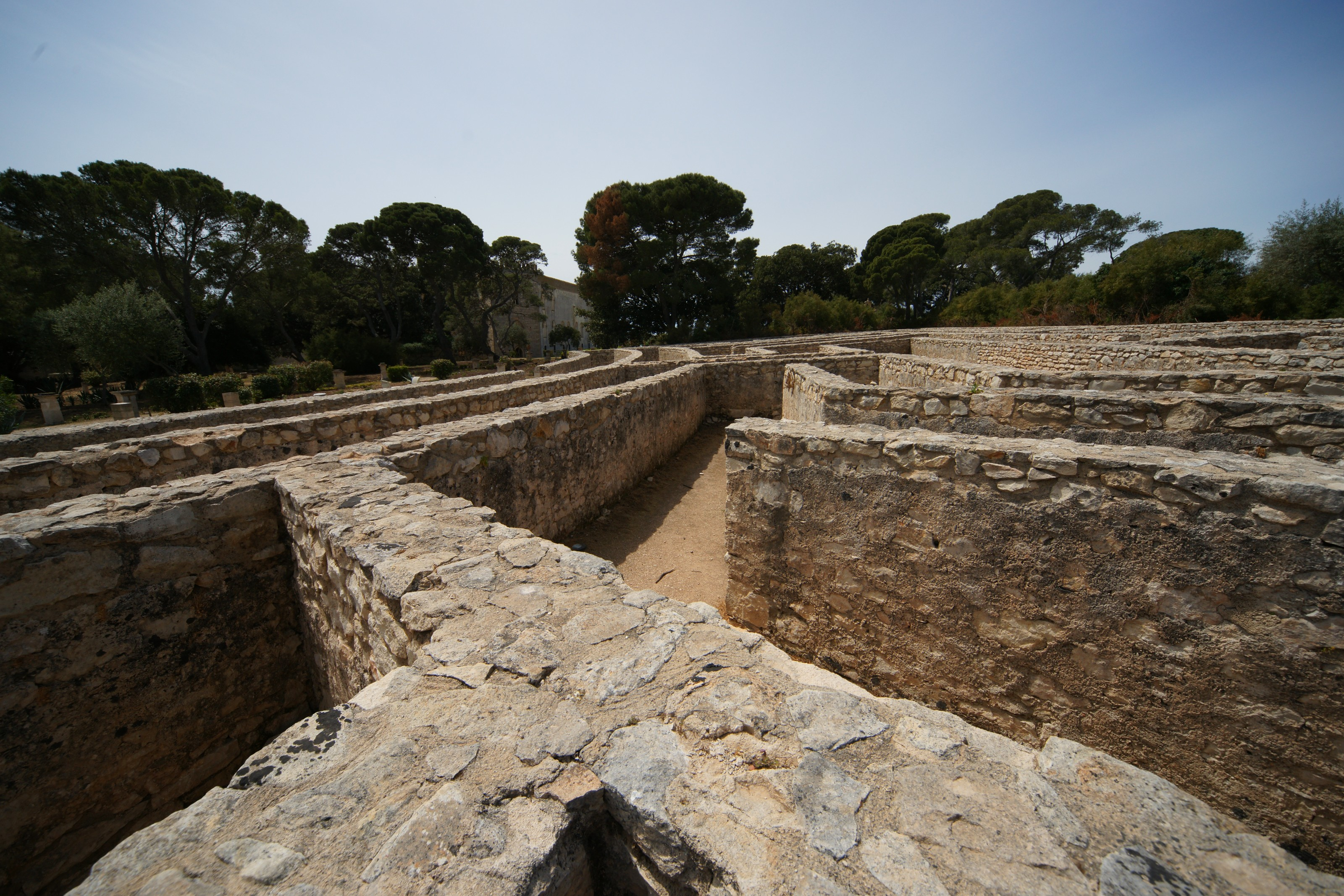
Detail of the stone labyrinth

The name is possibly the result of a linguistic corruption of the Arabic toponym عين الصحة (Ayn al-Ṣiḥḥat, i.e. Source of Health). In Sicilian it turns into Ronnafuata.

Alternatively, Donnafugata could translate from Italian as approximately "fugitive woman" or "woman who fled". Based on this interpretation, one legend claims that Queen Blanche of Navarre, widow of King Martin I of Aragon, was in hiding from Count Bernardo Cabrera, who wanted to marry her and assume leadership over Sicily. She hid in Donnafugata Castle until it was taken under siege by Cabrera, during which Giovanni Moncada helped her flee and hide again in the Steri Palace in Palermo. While this story may be true, it is not whence the castle's name originates.

Another source claims that the name Donnafugata refers to Queen Maria Carolina, wife of Ferdinand IV, who was confined to a palace in Santa Margherita di Belice by Lord William Bentinck, British military governor of Sicily from 1811-1816.
