= Kamarina Regional Archaeological Museum =

Museum in Sicily, Italy

- Museo archeologico regionale di Kamarina
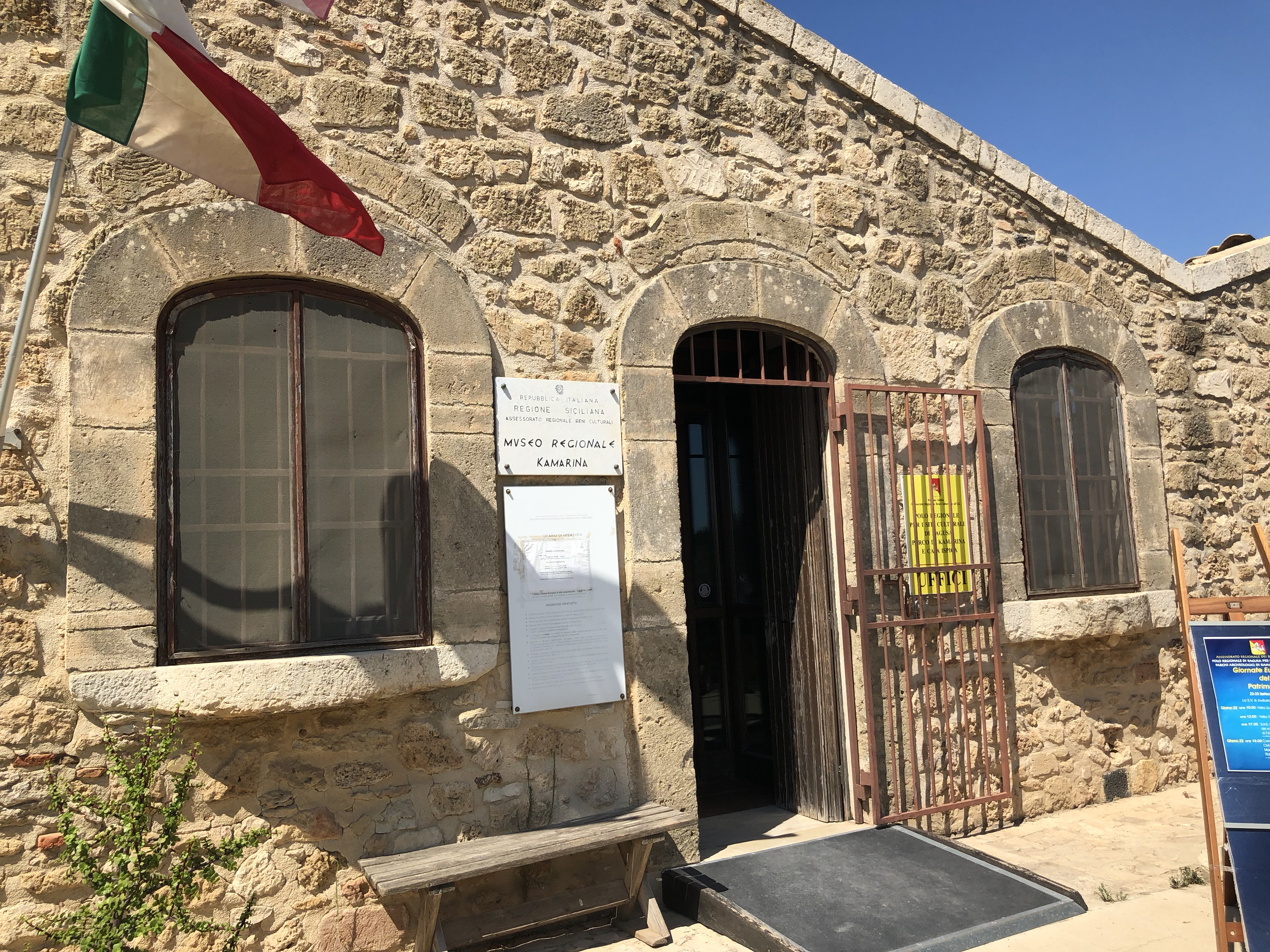
- Location: S.P. 102 Km.1, 97019 Contrada Cammarana, Ragusa, Sicily, Italy
- Coordinates: 36°52′19.70″N 14°26′50.99″E
- Type: Archaeology
- Website: www.beniculturali.it/luogo/museo-regionale-di-kamarina

The regional archaeological museum of Kamarina is in the vicinity of Scoglitti in the Libero consorzio comunale di Ragusa (Sicily) and consists of three pavilions and seven rooms exhibition.

== Underwater pavilion ==
The first room immediately after the entrance is dedicated to underwater archeology. Rich collections of artifacts are exhibited here, brought to light thanks to research carried out in the 1990s of 20th century in the sea in front of Kamarina. From the wreck of the Corinthian helmet , from the Archaic period (6th century BC), some remains of large amphora for transport, small Ionic kylikès and a magnificent and rare Corinthian helmet with hemispherical cap and paragnatidi included. This is followed by a helmet Attic – Etruscan in bronze, with movable knuckles, with shield boss a pine cone and some Greek type amphorae – italiche. Also exhibited are a bronze statuette of the god Harpocrates from the wreck mamertino , coins, weights, a group of oil lamps, a stonemason, a stylus, etc. From the wreck of the columns 3rd century, on the other hand, come many objects of exquisite workmanship in bronze: a perfume vase, a thermos, a glass bottle with a vegetable fiber basket, three strigils and various coins. Following is the exhibition of objects from the wreck of Aphrodite (3rd century) with a beautiful bronze statuette of Aphrodite, serving vases, and some supports of a triclinium. From the wreck of the Six Emperors there are 5,000 bronze coins (antoninianus), one steelyard, weights, soundings and various ornamental objects. Finally, from the medieval wreck, some farrier tools were exhibited.

== East Pavilion ==
=== Hall of prehistory ===
Leaving the Underwater Pavilion, towards the outside of the courtyard, you immediately enter the East Pavilion. The first room is dedicated to the various settlements in the territory in prehistoric age, in particular in the Bronze Age. In this hall exhibits some lithic tools (blades, awls, arrowheads, beater), typical of the faciès castellucciana of the Bronze Age. These finds come from excavations carried out along the coast Passo Marinaro, Piano Resti, Macchia Tonda and Branco Grande and inland near Santa Croce Camerina (Contrada Forche).

=== Archaic Camarina Room ===
From the archaic necropolis of Rifriscolaro, countless finds that accompanied the tombs are exhibited. On display are a Lekythos depicting Aeneas and Anchises, various Skyphoi and aryballoi Corinthian, ointment pots, and a beautiful half-fine white amphora 6th century BC with figurative scenes of armed knights and dancing maenads. This is followed by a burial in enchytrismòs (inhumation), a capuchin burial, a kantharos, an oinochoe in aeolian bucchero, an aryballos, with two roaring lions, a beautiful krater and other finely decorated funerary objects.

=== Hall Persephone ===
This room is dedicated to the cults known to Kamarina. In particular, the sanctuary of Demeter and Kore, brought to light by Paolo Orsi in 1896, is documented here. It is possible to admire various protomes and torsos of statuettes seated on the throne, of the Hippocratic period 491 BC, with the polos, on the type of Athena Lindia and other terracotta statuettes depicting the type standing with piglet in the chest. In this room there is also a terracotta arula decorated with the relief representation of a Gorgon 6th–5th century BC. and some decorative elements of the temple of Athena.

=== Hall of the Temple of Athena ===
Room dedicated to the temple of Athena. Here you can see a part of the colmata embankment 4th century BC), the access ramp to the pronaos and the massive foundation structures of the temple. The Templar building is a cell in antis built in blocks of calcarenite on a crepidoma with three steps. The temple was divided into three spaces corresponding to the pronaos, the cella and the opisthodomos.

== West Pavilion ==
=== Classic Camarina room ===
Here the urban history of the new Kamarina is represented, that of the classical age, from the beginning of 5th century BC, where the important public space of the Agorà and some urban districts with the various plateie and stenopoi. There are some photographic documentation of the Camarinese coinage depicting Athena, Demeter and Kore, the nymph Camarina, Zeus and the God Hipparis. Finally, the various researches are documented in Kamarina's chora.

=== Necropolis room of Passo Marinaro ===
In this large room various funerary objects dating back to the 5th–4th century BC are exhibited. from the excavations carried out at the classic necropolis of Passo Marinaro. Bell-shaped kraters on a red background with black figures, oil lamps, bowls, bowls, black painted olpai and other valuable Attic ceramic furnishings. In this room there is also a capuchin burial with grave goods, a funerary epigraph by Hippo and tiles with stamps, an altar and some reconstructive models of a Greek farm and of the whole archaeological site.
