= Camarina (mythology) =

In Greek mythology, Camarina (Ancient Greek: Καμάρινα, romanized: Kamárina) was an Oceanid, as a daughter of the Titan of the Sea, Oceanus, possibly by his sister-wife Tethys. She was the eponym of the city of Kamarina in Sicily.
