= Psaumis of Camarina =

Siceliot horseman and athlete

Psaumis of Camarina (Greek: Ψαῦμις Καμαριναῖος, romanized: Psaûmis Kamarinaîos) was a charioteer who won the Olympic four-horse chariot race (tethrippon) in the 82nd Olympiad (452 BC). He probably had already won the two-mule chariot race in the previous edition of the 81st Olympiad and he also competed unsuccessfully in the mounted-horse race. He was the son of Akron (Greek: Ἂκρων), according to one of the odes written about him.

A pair of odes attributed to Pindar (Olympian 4 & 5) celebrate his victory, but these may actually be the work of a Sicilian imitator of Pindar.

The fourth ode provides the most biographical information:

To you he has dedicated rich renown by his victory, and he had his father Acron and his new-founded home proclaimed by the herald. Coming from the lovely homes of Oenomaus and of Pelops, he sings of your sacred grove, Pallas protector of the city, and of the river Oanis, and the local lake, and the sacred canals with which Hipparis waters its people, and swiftly builds a tall-standing grove of steadfast dwellings, bringing this host of citizens out of helplessness into the light.

— Odes Pindar (5.7-12), trans. Diane Arnson Svarlien, 1990
