= Kamarina, Sicily =

Ancient Greek city state in Sicily

- Location within Italy
- 36°52′18″N 14°26′51″E
- Type: Settlement
- Cultures: Greek, Roman
- Location: Scoglitti, Ragusa, Sicily, Italy

History
- Built: 599 BC
- Built by: Syracuse
- Abandoned: 853 AD

Site notes
- Management: Soprintendenza BB.CC.AA. di Ragusa
- Website: Museo Archeologico Regionale di Camarina (in Italian)

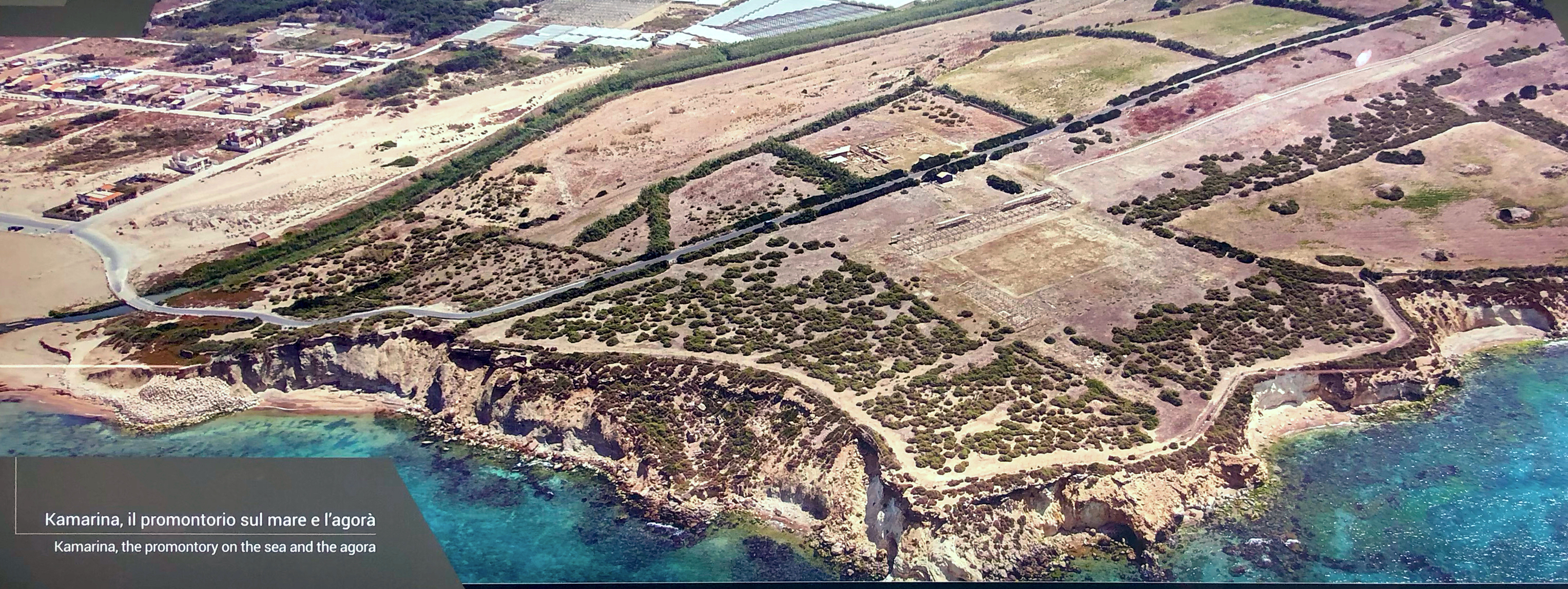
Promontory of Kamarina

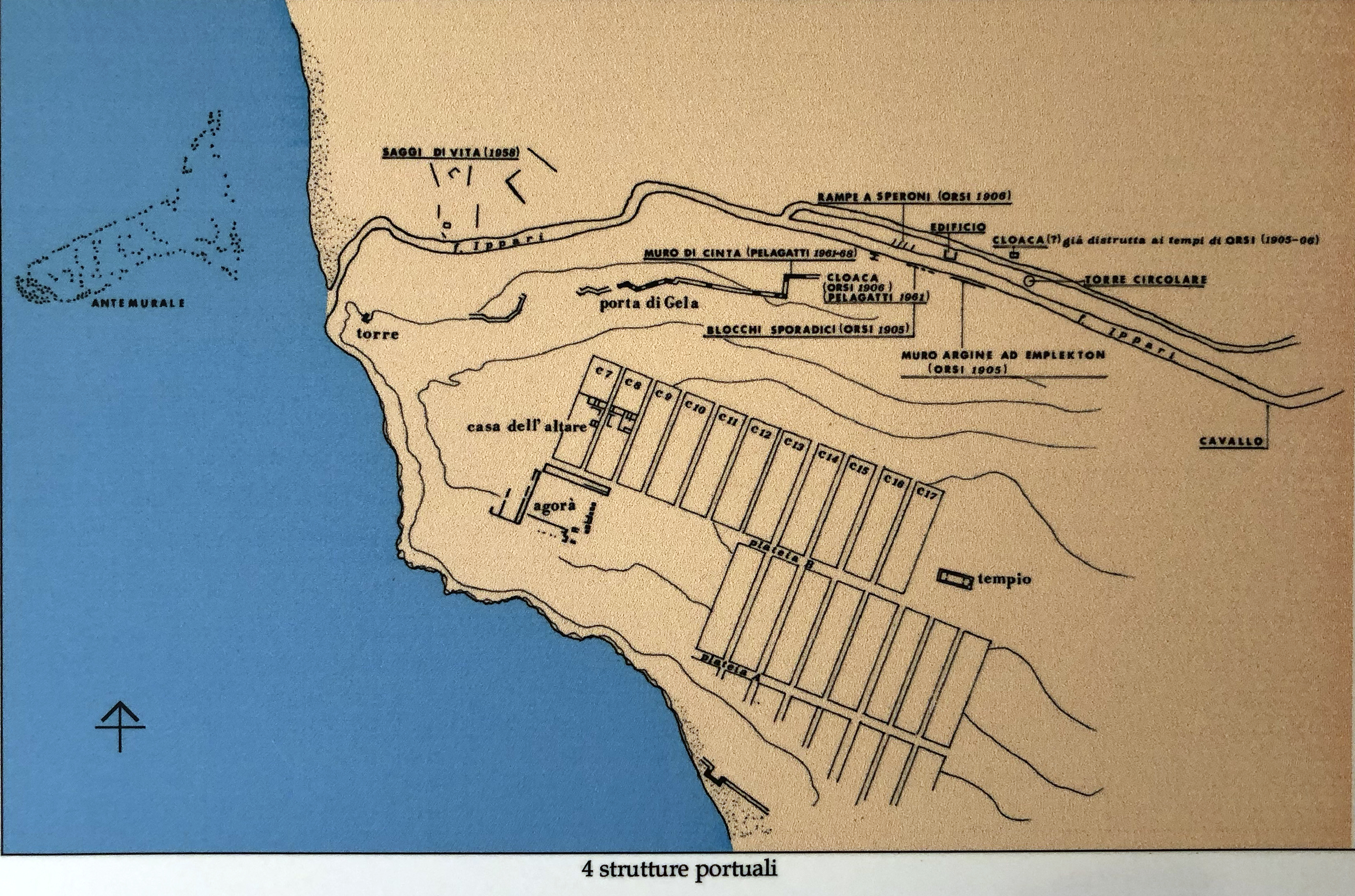
Map of ancient Kamarina

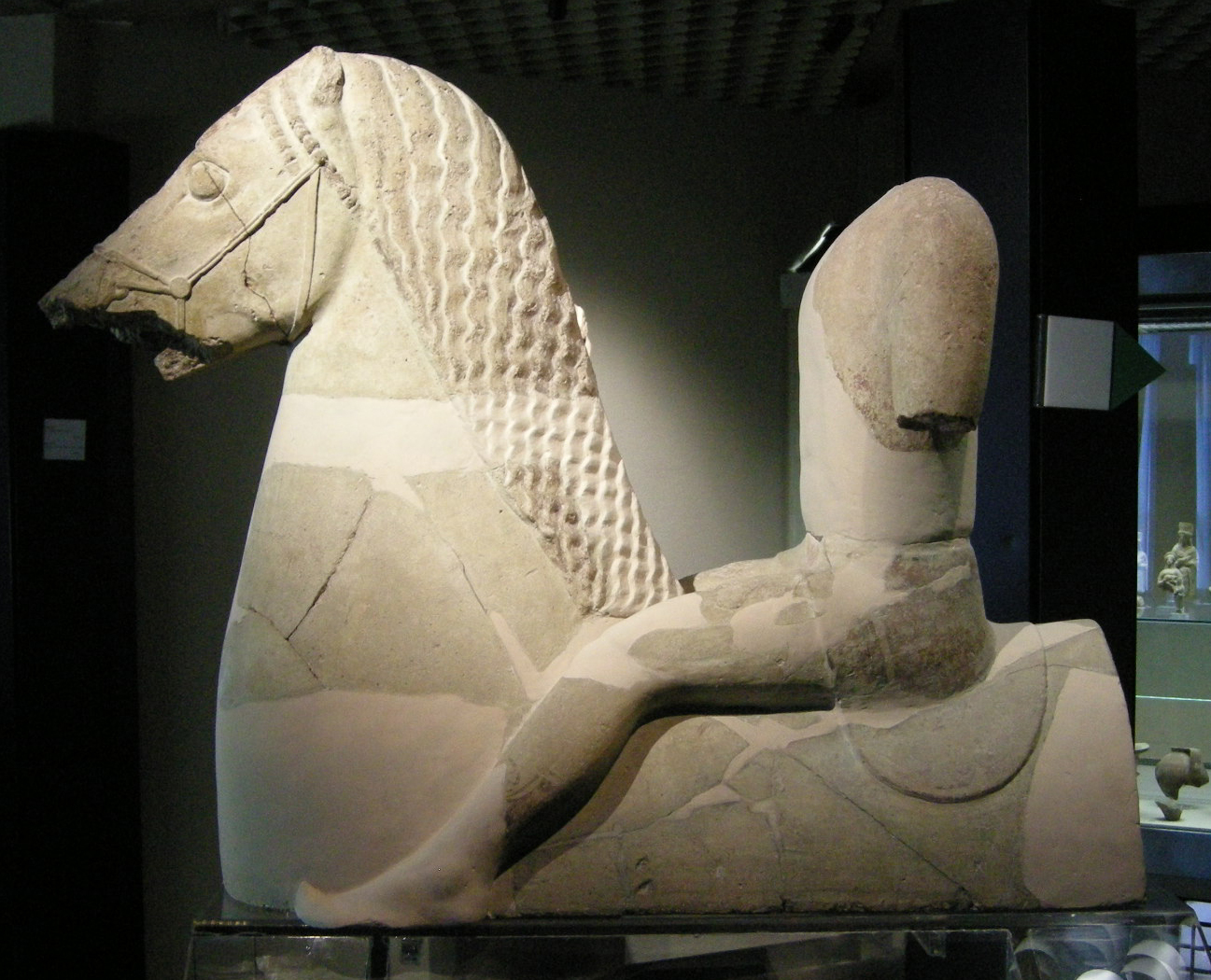
Horseman from Kamarina, 6th c. BC (Syracuse museum)

Kamarina or Camarina (Ancient Greek: Καμάρινα) was an ancient city on the southern coast of Sicily in Magna Graecia. The ruins of the site and an archaeological museum are located south of the modern town of Scoglitti, a frazione (borough) of the comune (municipality) of Vittoria in the province of Ragusa.

== Geography ==
The city of Camarina was located 112 km west of Syracuse, between the rivers Hipparis and Oanis and on the south bank of Hipparis which also acted as a moat for the city. It had two harbours at the river mouths but not big enough to accommodate a large fleet and ships had to be beached on the shore. The land north of the river originally contained marshes, which would have caused difficulty for invaders.

== History ==
It was founded in Magna Graecia by Syracuse in 599 BC, but after it rebelled against its mother city with the aid of the Sicels, it was sacked in 552 BC, rejoining the Syracuse domain. Camarina rebelled again in 492 BC and Hippocrates of Gela (498-491 BC) intervened to wage war against Syracuse. After defeating the Syracusan army at the Heloros river, he besieged the city but was persuaded to retreat in exchange for possession of Camarina.

It was destroyed by Gela in 484 BC but the Geloans founded it anew in 461 BC, under the Olympic charioteer Psaumis of Camarina. They appear to have done so with a democratic constitution (alongside a more general institution of democracies in the wake of the Common Resolution). In 415 Thucydides describes a public meeting (syllogos) at which the city decided for neutrality (though it later voted to reverse this decision). A series of more than 140 lead plates, discovered around the Temple of Athena, and with information about citizens written on them, has suggested to some that Kamarina used allotment to select jurors and city officials (as Athens and other democratic city-states did). These may, however, have had some other use, for example, as a register of citizens for military purposes.

It had allied with Leontini and Athens in 427 BC against Syracuse, while Gela was an ally of Syracuse. In the Sicilian wars that followed, Camarina and Gela concluded an armistice in 425 BC. To settle peace in the rest of the island, the two cities not only sent ambassadors but also granted them unusually broad power to conduct diplomacy and invited all the belligerents to convene and discuss peace terms which were agreed at the Congress of Gela, and Syracuse ceded Morgantina to Camarina in exchange for money.

Then it aided Syracuse during the Athenian Expedition in 415–413 BC.

Camarina had contributed 500 hoplites, 600 light troops and 20 horse to defend Akragas against the Carthaginians in 406 BC. After its fall, Gela was attacked by the Carthaginians in 405 BC and the allied Greek army cammanded by Dionysius I was defeated and led to the Sack of Camarina. Dionysius evacuated Gela and the Greek army had fallen back to Camarina after a forced march along with Gelan refugees. Dionysius ordered the citizens of Camarina to leave their city instead of organizing a defence. The Carthaginians sacked Camarina and encamped before Syracuse during the summer, and after a while a peace treaty was signed which confirmed Carthaginian control over Selinus, Akragas, Gela, and Camarina, but Greeks were allowed to return to these cities, and Camarina was forbidden to repair their walls.

Before this event the Kamarinians were plagued with a mysterious disease. The marsh of Kamarina had protected the city from its hostile neighbours to the north. It was suspected that the marsh was the source of the strange illness and the idea of draining the marsh to end the epidemic became popular (the germ theory of disease was millennia in the future, but some people associated swamps with disease). The town oracle was consulted. The oracle advised the leaders not to drain the marsh, suggesting the plague would pass with time. But the discontent was widespread and the leaders opted to drain the marsh against the oracle's advice. Once it was dry, there was nothing stopping the Carthaginian army from advancing. They marched across the newly drained marsh and razed the city, killing every last inhabitant.

Kamarina was restored by the Corinthian Timoleon to Syracusan control in 339 BC. A new period of prosperity followed, after the reconstruction of the city by Timoleon.

Having sided with the Carthaginians during a conflict with Syracuse in 311 BC, it was razed in 309 BC by Syracusan troops.

=== Roman era ===
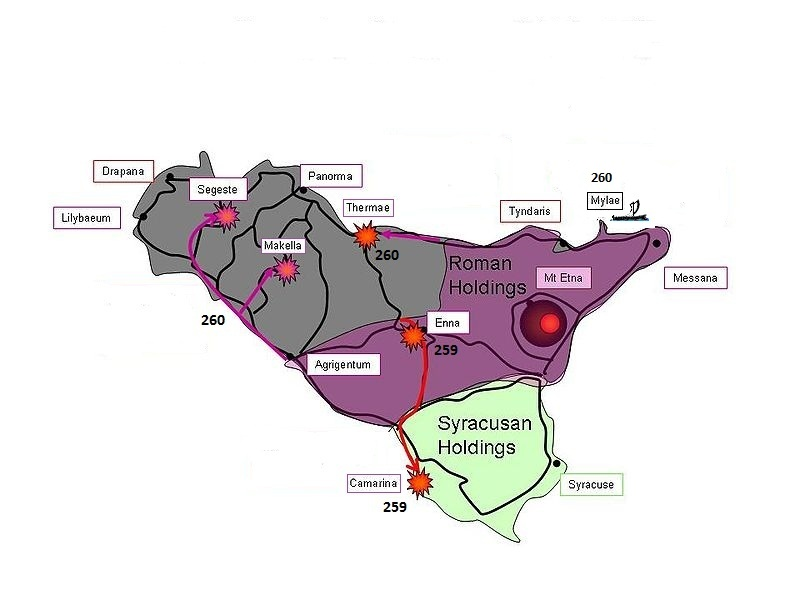
Carthaginian advance 260-259 BC

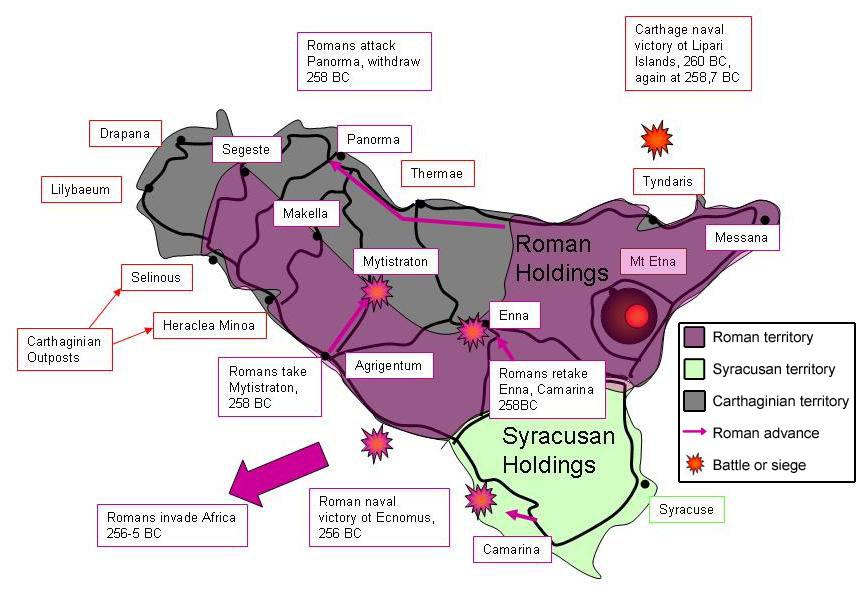
Roman Advance 258 BC

In 259 BC in the First Punic War, the Carthaginians under Hamilcar seized Kamarina. In 258 BC it fell into the hands of the Romans after a lengthy siege at the Battle of Kamarina.

The battle is notable for two events: first, the consul Aulus Atilius Calatinus's foolish decision to march his troops into a ravine where they were ambushed and almost massacred; secondly, the wisdom and bravery of the military tribune Marcus Calpurnius Flamma who identified the strategic advantage of a nearby hilltop and led 300 men to the top, diverting the Carthaginians from Atilius and allowing the main force to escape from the ravine. All 300 of Calpurnius’ men died on the hill; he himself was left for dead but survived and was taken prisoner.

The city never fully recovered. It was mostly depopulated at the time of Strabo, (1st c. BC) and was later only partially reoccupied.

Kamarina's complete destruction dates from the Arab conquest in AD 827.

== The Site ==
The remains are of great archaeological interest, and testify to the vastness of the ancient site. The Kamarina Regional Archaeological Museum is in the archaeological park which includes many excavated remains:

- Agora
- temple of Athena
- the city wall
- the necropolis from 7th and 5th-4th centuries BC has been carefully explored. Some of the contents are now in the archaeological museum of Syracuse.
- the port-channel along the Ippari river is recognisable, made in the Greek age with adaptation of the mouth of the river, and lasted for a long time as the hub of important commercial traffic up to the Roman age.
- the house of the altar.

The remains of a "Hamman qbel Jamaa", public baths used before entering the mosque, are one of only two known on the island.

== Gallery ==
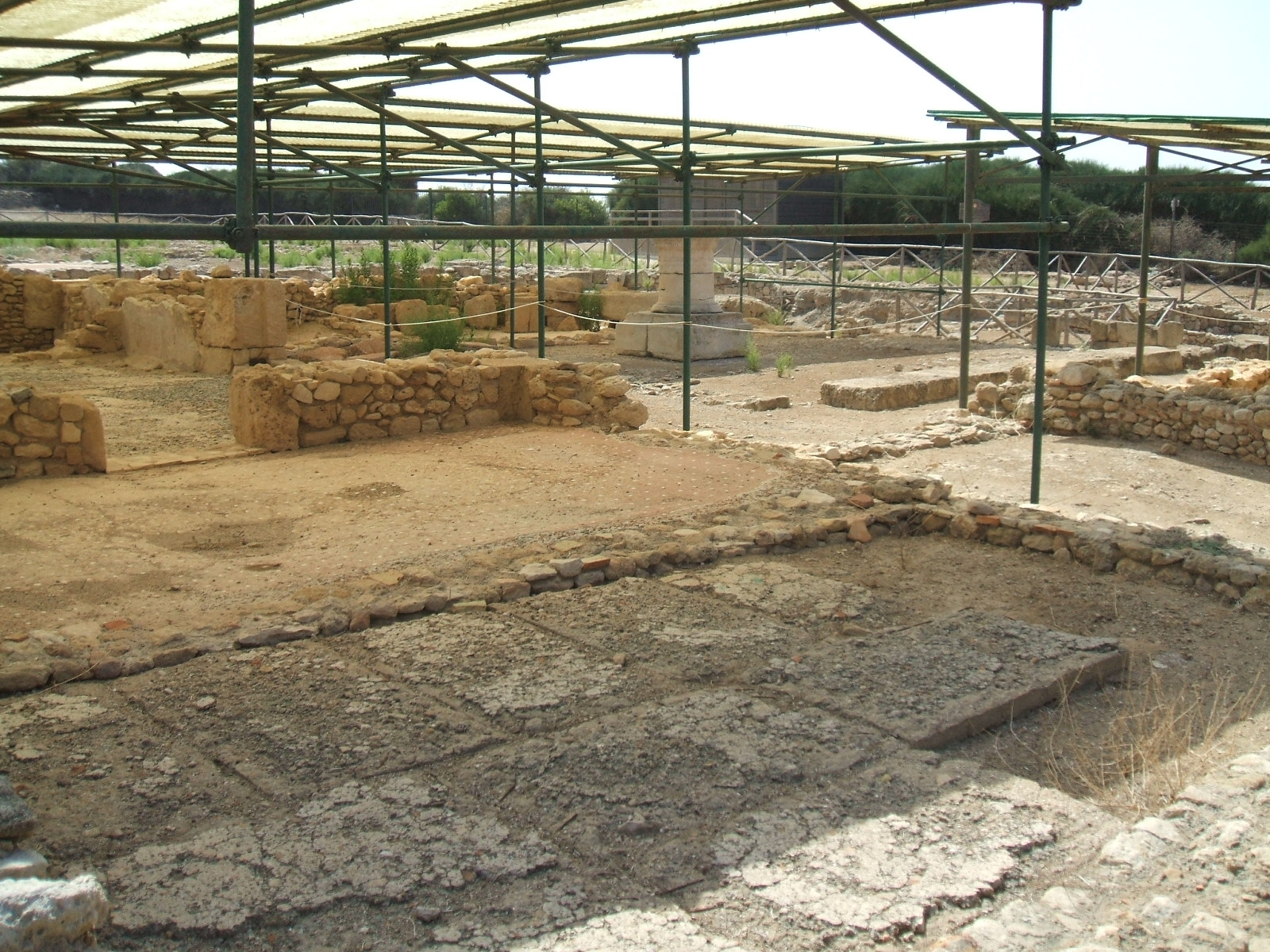
The House of the Altar

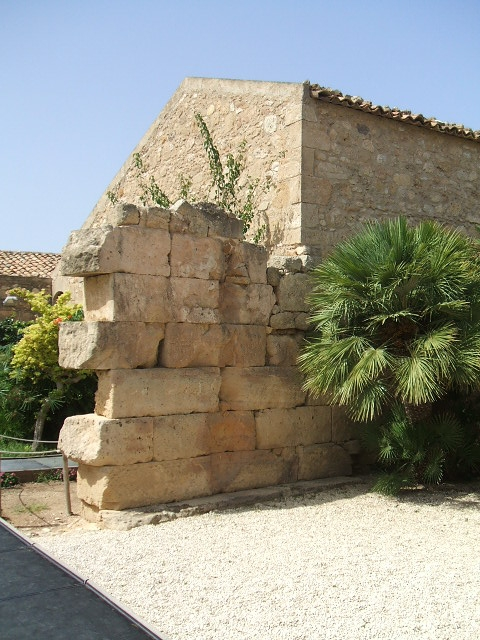
A part of the wall of the temple of Athena

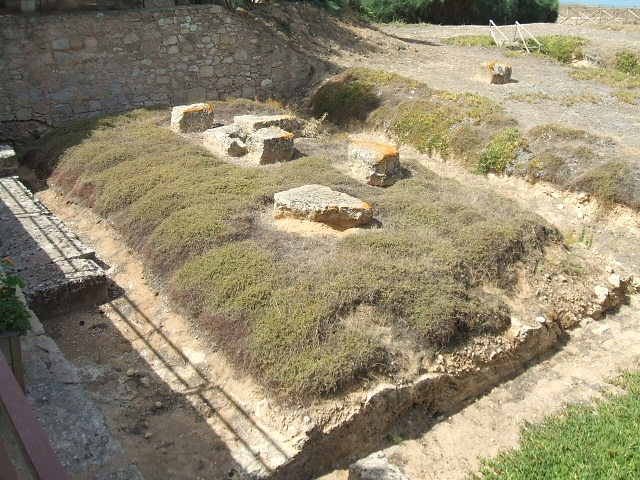
Ruins of the temple of Athena

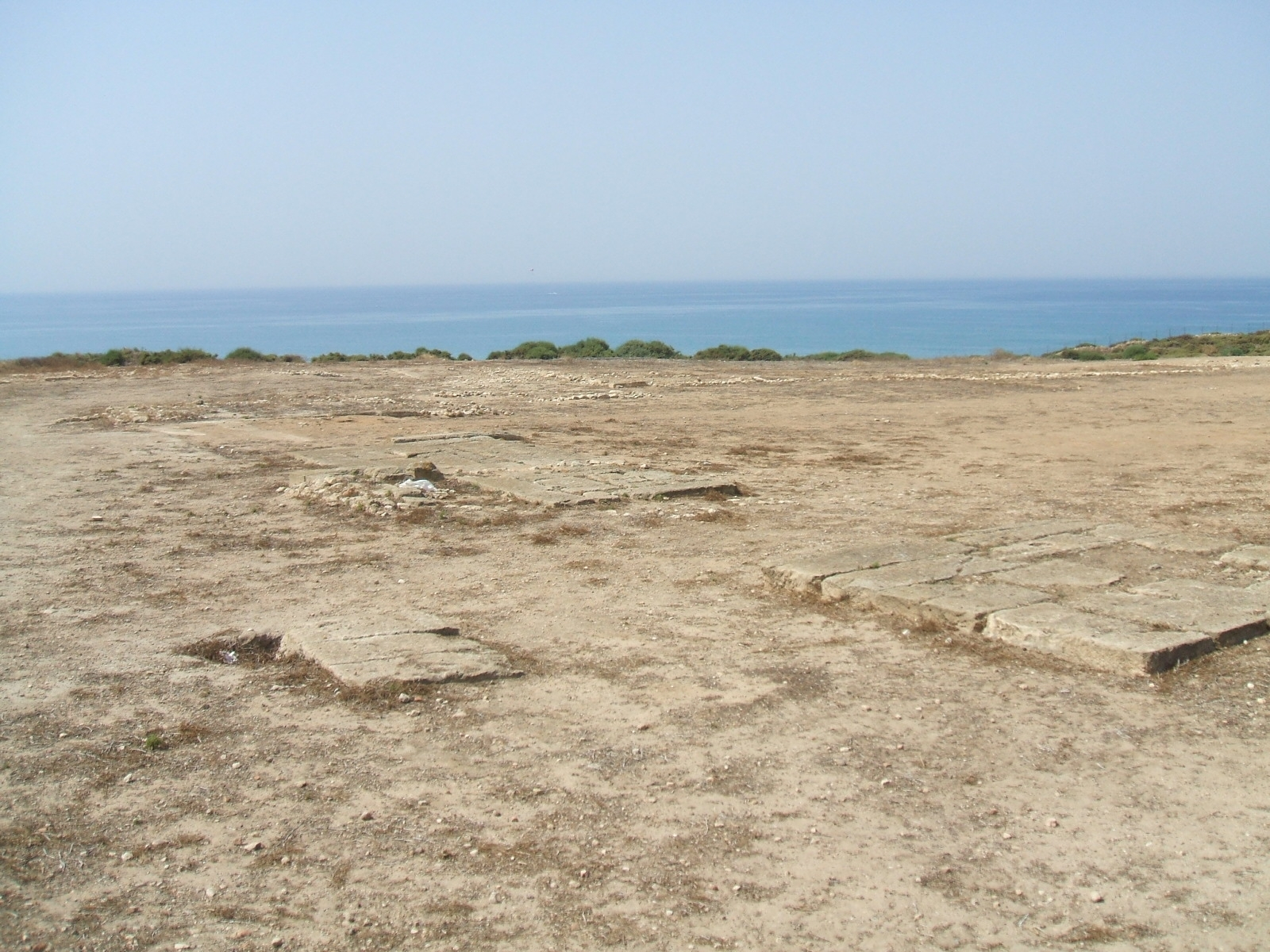
Agora

== See also ==
- List of ancient Greek cities
